= Balagarh (community development block) =

- Community Development Block
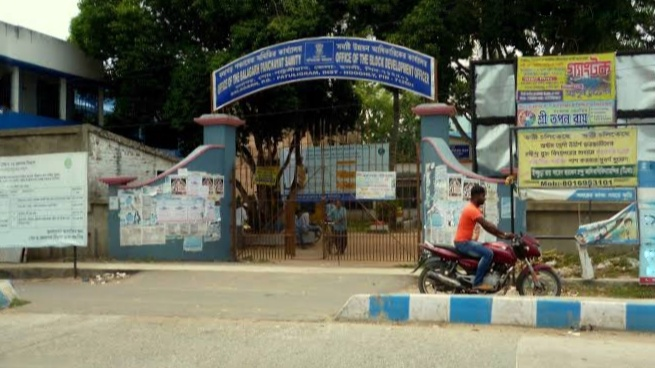
- Balagarh BDO Office, Jirat

- Coordinates: 23.109444°N 88.460278°E
- Country: India
- State: West Bengal
- District: Hooghly

Government
  - Type: Representative democracy

Area
  - Total: 202.15 km^{2} (78.05 sq mi)
- Elevation: 17 m (56 ft)

Population (2011)
  - Total: 228,998
  - Density: 1,132.8/km^{2} (2,934.0/sq mi)

Languages
  - Official: Bengali, English
- Time zone: UTC+5:30 (IST)
- PIN: 712501 (Balagarh/Jirat); 712512 (Guptipara); 712123 (Somrabazar)
- Area code: 03454
- ISO 3166 code: IN-WB
- Vehicle registration: WB-15, WB-16, WB-18
- Literacy: 76.94%
- Lok Sabha constituency: Hooghly
- Vidhan Sabha constituency: Balagarh
- Website: hooghly.gov.in

Balagarh is a Community Development Block, located at Balagarh, West Bengal, India, that forms an administrative division in Chinsurah Subdivision of Hooghly in the Indian state of West Bengal.

== Overview ==
The Balagarh CD Block is mostly part of the Hooghly Flats, one of the three natural regions in the district of the flat alluvial plains that forms part of the Gangetic Delta. The region is a narrow strip of land along the 80 km long stretch of the Hooghly River, that forms the eastern boundary of the district. The region has been physiographically influenced by the course of the river. The western part of the block gradually merges into the Hooghly-Damodar Plain.

== Geography ==
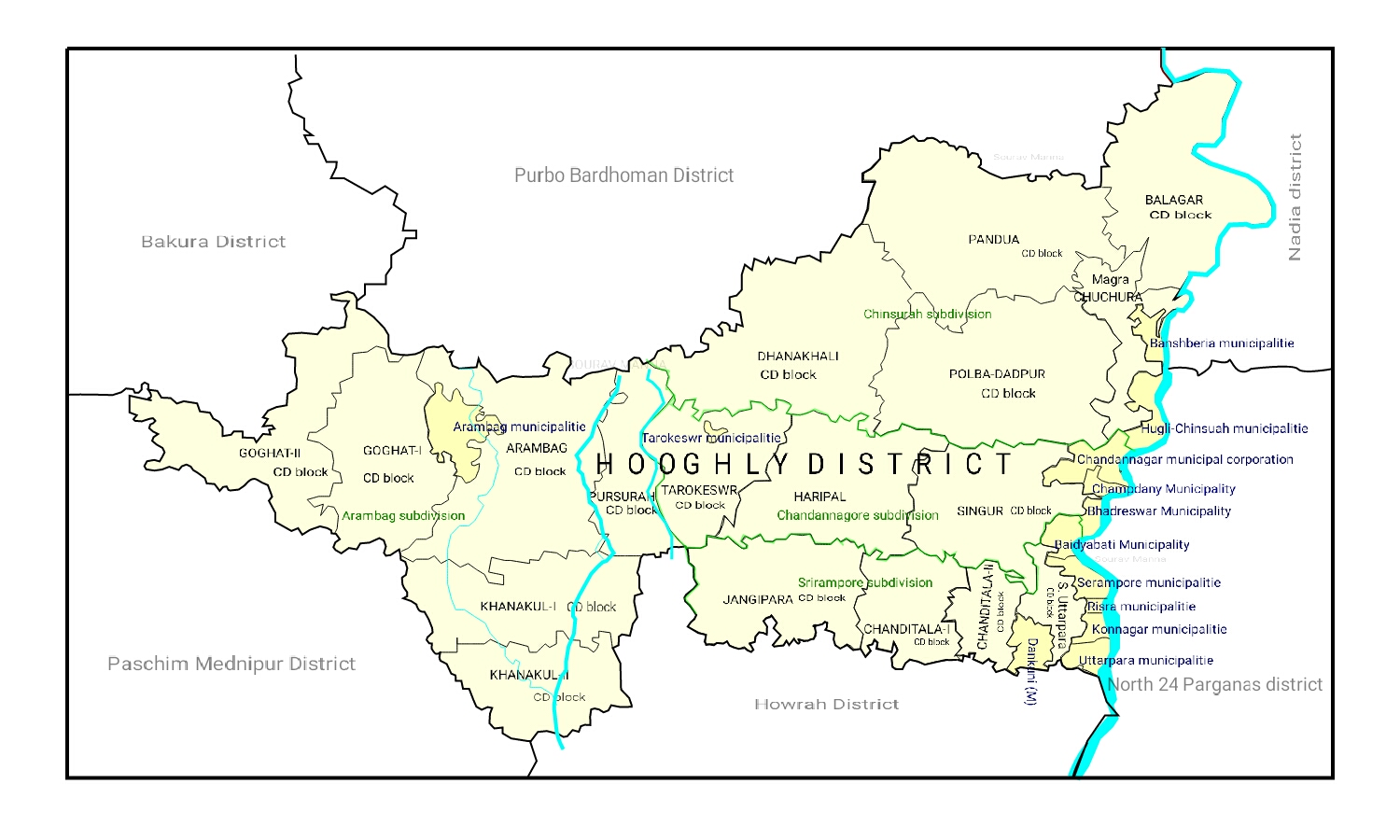
Map of Hooghly district showing CD blocks and municipal areas

Balagarh is located at 23°06′34″N 88°27′37″E.

Map of Balagarh CD block sowing GP areas

Balagarh CD Block is bounded by Santipur and Ranaghat I CD Blocks, in Nadia districts across the Hooghly, in the north, Ranaghat I CD Block, in Nadia district across the Hooghly the east, Chinsurah Mogra CD Block in the south and Pandua and Kalna II CD Blocks, in Bardhaman district, in the west.

It is located 30 km from Chinsurah, the district headquarters.

Balagarh CD Block has an area of 202.15 km^{2}. It has 1 panchayat samity, 13 gram panchayats, 183 gram sansads (village councils), 135 mouzas and 129 inhabited villages. Balagarh police station serves this block. Headquarters of this CD Block is at Patuligram, Jirat.

Gram panchayats of Balagarh block/ panchayat samiti are: Jirat (Sadar), Charkrishnabati, Dumurdaha-Nityanandapur I, Dumurdaha-Nityanandapur II, Ektarpur, Guptipara I, Guptipara II, Bakulia-Dhobapara, Mohipalpur, Siza-Kamalpur, Somra I, Somra II and Sripur-Balagarh.

== Demographics ==
=== Population ===
As per the 2011 Census of India, Balagarh CD Block had a total population of 228,998, of which 200,810 were rural and 28,188 were urban. There were 116,828 (51%) males and 112,870 (49%) females. Population below 6 years was 21,396. Scheduled Castes numbered 93,402 (40.79%) and Scheduled Tribes numbered 21,129 (9.23%).

As per the 2001 census, Balagarh block had a total population of 214,710, out of which 110,121 were males and 104,589 were females. Balagarh block registered a population growth of 15.40 per cent during the 1991-2001 decade. Decadal growth for Hooghly district was 15.72 per cent. Decadal growth in West Bengal was 17.84 per cent.

Census Towns in Balagarh CD Block (2011 census figures in brackets): Badhagachhi (5,052), Mirdhanga (8,482), Sripur (7,224) and Jirat (7,430).

Large villages (with 4,000+ population) in Balagarh CD Block (2011 census figures in brackets): Aida Kismat (4,843), Krishnabati (6,070), Nutan Char Krishnabati (4,715), Dumurdahadham (4,187), Dakshin Gopalpur (7,581) and Serpur (5,983).

Other villages in Balagarh CD Block included (2011 census figures in brackets): Guptipara (2,169), Patuli (1,475).

=== Literacy ===
As per the 2011 census the total number of literates in Balagarh CD Block was 159,735 (76.94% of the population over 6 years) out of which males numbered 87,232 (82.36% of the male population over 6 years) and females numbered 72,503 (71.30% of the female population over 6 years). The gender disparity (the difference between female and male literacy rates) was 11.05%.

As per the 2001 census, Balagarh block had a total literacy of 50.07 per cent. While male literacy was 68.38 per cent, female literacy was 49.98 per cent.

See also – List of West Bengal districts ranked by literacy rate

Literacy in CD blocks of
Hooghly district
Arambagh subdivision
Arambagh – 79.10
Khanakul I – 77.73
Khanakul II – 79.16
Goghat I – 78.70
Goghat II – 77.24
Pursurah – 82.12
Chandannagar subdivision
Haripal – 78.59
Singur – 84.01
Tarakeswar – 79.96
Chinsurah subdivision
Balagarh – 76.94
Chinsurah Mogra – 83.01
Dhaniakhali – 75.66
Pandua – 75.86
Polba Dadpur – 75.14
Srirampore subdivision
Chanditala I – 83.76
Chanditala II – 84.78
Jangipara – 75.34
Sreerampur Uttarpara – 87.33
Source: 2011 Census: CD Block Wise
Primary Census Abstract Data

=== Language and religion ===
Religion in Balagarh CD block (2011)
Hinduism	89.24%
Islam	8.81%
Other (tribal religion)	1.81%
Other or not stated	0.14%

As per the 2011 census, majority of the population of the district belong to the Hindu community with a population share of 82.9% followed by Muslims at 15.8%. The percentage of the Hindu population of the district has followed a decreasing trend from 87.1% in 1961 to 82.9% in the latest census 2011. On the other hand, the percentage of Muslim population has increased from 12.7% in 1961 to 15.8% in 2011 census.

In 2011 census Hindus numbered 204,353 and formed 89.24% of the population in Balagarh CD Block. Muslims numbered 20,185 and formed 8.81% of the population. Others numbered 4,460 and formed 1.95% of the population.

Languages of Balagarh CD block (2011)
1. Bengali (92.8%)
2. Santali (4.99%)
3. Hindi (1.97%)
4. Others (0.24%)

At the time of the 2011 census, 92.80% of the population spoke Bengali, 4.99% Santali and 1.97% Hindi as their first language.

== Rural poverty ==
As per poverty estimates obtained from household survey for families living below poverty line in 2005, rural poverty in Balagarh CD Block was 11.19%.

== Economy ==
=== Livelihood ===
Livelihood
in Balagarh CD Block
1. Cultivators (15.9%)
2. Agricultural labourers (43.0%)
3. Household industries (4.34%)
4. Other Workers (36.7%)

In Balagarh CD Block in 2011, amongst the class of total workers, cultivators formed 15.95%, agricultural labourers 42.99%, household industry workers 4.34% and other workers 36.72%.

=== Infrastructure ===
There are 129 inhabited villages in Balagarh CD Block. 100% villages have power supply. 108 villages have more than one source of drinking water (tap, well, tube well, hand pump), 19 villages have only tube well/ borewell and 2 villages have only hand pump. 7 Villages have post offices, 16 villages have sub post offices and 3 villages have post and telegraph offices. 118 villages have landlines, 80 villages have public call offices and 126 villages have mobile phone coverage. 67 villages have pucca roads and 56 villages have bus service (public/ private). 15 villages have agricultural credit societies, 22 villages have commercial/ co-operative banks and 3 villages have ATMs.

=== Industry ===
Balagarh was selected the site for power station by Calcutta Electric Supply Corporation but the project was shelved. According to C.E.S.C.Web Journal of 16 April 2010 it will be revived by them. Balagarh's economy specially depends on building of country boats and manufacture of tiles which is famous all over India.

=== Agriculture ===
Important Handicrafts of Hooghly District
- Zari Work on Sari - Pandua, Pursurah, Jangipara, Tarakeswar and other blocks - 3,000 families involved
- Chikon Embroidery – Babnan, Pandua, Singur - 2,500 families involved
- Silk and Cotton Printing – Serampore (Chanditala) - 300 families involved
- Brass and Bell Metal – Manikpat, Goghat, Arambagh - 150 families involved
- Conch Shell – Pandua, Khanakul, Makla, Chandannagar
- Jute Diversified Product – Baidyabati, Mogra
- Terracota – Chinsurah, Chandannagar, Baidyabati, Mogra

Source:District Human Development Report 2010: Hooghly P. 67

Amongst the primary and other hats or markets in the Balagarh block area are at: Jeerat and Semra.

The Tebhaga movement launched in 1946, in 24 Parganas district, aimed at securing for the share-croppers a better position within the existing land relation structure. Although the subsequent Bargadari Act of 1950 recognised the rights of bargadars to a higher share of crops from the land that they tilled, it was not implemented fully. Large tracts, beyond the prescribed limit of land ceiling, remained with the rich landlords. From 1977 onwards major land reforms took place in West Bengal. Land in excess of land ceiling was acquired and distributed amongst the peasants. Following land reforms land ownership pattern has undergone transformation. In 2013-14, persons engaged in agriculture in Balagarh CD Block could be classified as follows: bargadars 8.29%, patta (document) holders 13.67%, small farmers (possessing land between 1 and 2 hectares) 1.41%, marginal farmers (possessing land up to 1 hectare) 13.78% and agricultural labourers 62.85%.

Balagarh CD Block had 116 fertiliser depots, 44 seed stores and 55 fair price shops in 2013-14.

In 2013-14, Balagarh CD Block produced 35,048 tonnes of Aman paddy, the main winter crop from 13,376 hectares, 22,623 tonnes of Boro paddy (spring crop) from 7,895 hectares, 4 tonnes of wheat from 2 hectares, 80,440 tonnes of jute from 3,825 hectares and 60,285 tonnes of potatoes from 2,890 hectares. It also produced pulses and oilseeds.

In 2013-14, the total area irrigated in Balagarh CD Block was 14,584 hectares, out of which 1,800 hectares were irrigated by canal water, 1,220 hectares by tank water, 3,040 hectares by river lift irrigation, 3,050 hectares by deep tube wells and 5,474 hectares by shallow tube wells.

=== Banking ===
In 2013-14, Balagarh CD Block had offices of 12 commercial banks and 2 gramin banks.

== Transport ==
Balagarh CD Block has 8 ferry services and 6 originating/ terminating bus routes.

The Bandel-Katwa Branch Line passes through this block and there are stations at Balagarh, Jirat, Samra Bazar, Behula and Guptipara. It is part of the Kolkata Suburban Railway network.

The State Highway 6 (West Bengal), running from Rajnagar (in Birbhum district) to Alampur (in Howrah district) passes through this block.

== Education ==
In 2013-14, Balagarh CD Block had 162 primary schools with 12,195 students, 5 middle schools with 375 students, 11 high schools with 5,293 students and 15 higher secondary schools with 17,629 students. Balagarh CD Block had 1 general college with 1,958 students, 3 technical/ professional institutions with 2,558 students and 379 institutions for special and non-formal education with 6,541 students

Balagarh Bijoy Krishna Mahavidyalaya, a general degree college, was established at Balagarh in 1985.

In Balagarh CD Block, amongst the 129 inhabited villages, 10 had no school, 40 had more than 1 primary school, 92 had at least 1 primary school, 27 had at least 1 primary and 1 middle school and 21 had at least 1 middle and 1 secondary school.

== Culture ==
=== Library ===
In Balagarh there is a 115 year's old public library named as Chandra Saraswati Pathagar. There is another big library of Sripur kalyan Samiti (125 year's).

=== Guptipara ===
Guptipara is a town under Balagarh Police Station.

The first publicly organised Jagadhatri Puja was held at Guptipara, when some men were stopped from taking part in a household Jagadhatri puja. Twelve of them formed a committee and organised a barowari (baro means twelve and yar means friend) puja (worshipping). There is a difference of opinion about the year of worship – 1761 or 1790.

There are some old temples in the village - Brindabanchandra Temple, Chaitanyadev Temple, Krishna Chandra Temple and Ramachandra Temple.

== Healthcare ==
In 2014, Balagarh CD Block had 1 block primary health centre, 6 primary health centres and 4 private nursing homes with total 40 beds and 4 doctors (excluding private bodies). It had 36 family welfare subcentres. 2,150 patients were treated indoor and 263,300 patients were treated outdoor in the hospitals, health centres and subcentres of the CD Block.

Jirat Hospital (with 30 beds) is located in Jirat, Ahammadpur area, Bakulia Primary Health Centre at PO Bakuliagram (with 6 beds), Dumurdaha-Nityanadapur PHC at PO Gopalpur (10 beds), Guptipara PHC (with 10 beds), Mohipalpur PHC at PO Bridabanpur (with 4 beds), Sukharia PHC at Somra (with 4 beds) and Sripur-Bolagarh PHC at PO Balagarh (with 10 beds).

Balagarh CD Block is one of the areas of Hooghly district where ground water is affected by high level of arsenic contamination. The WHO guideline for arsenic in drinking water is 10 mg/ litre, and the Indian Standard value is 50 mg/ litre. In Hooghly district, 16 blocks have arsenic levels above WHO guidelines and 11 blocks above Indian standard value. The maximum concentration in Balagarh CD Block is 600 mg/litre.
