= Brindaban Chandra's Math =

Hindu Temple in West Bengal

Brindaban Chandra’s Math
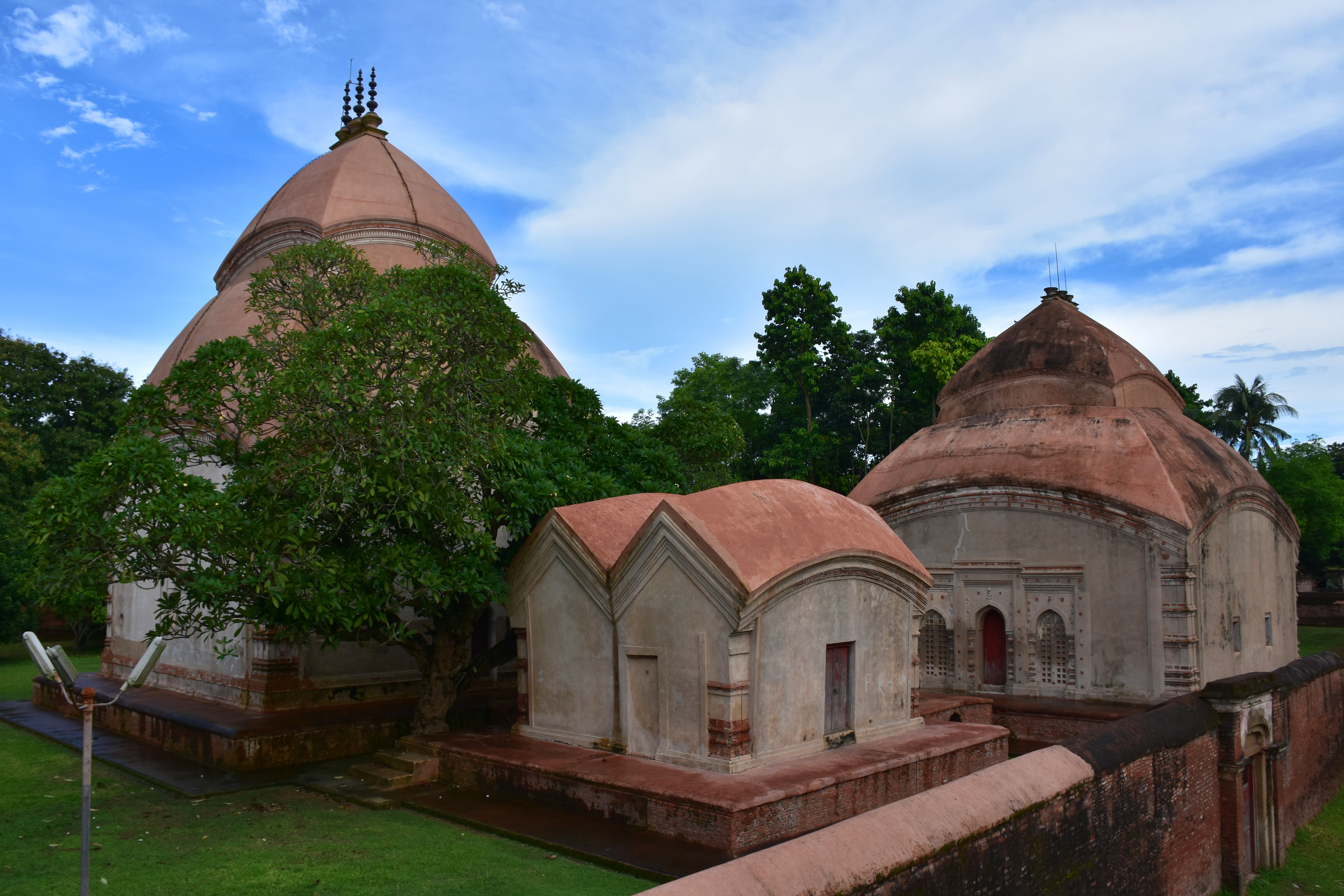
- Brindaban Chandra’s Math at Guptipara

- Location within West Bengal Location within India

Religion
- Affiliation: Hinduism

Location
- Location: Guptipara, Hooghly district
- State: West Bengal
- Country: India
- Interactive map of Brindaban Chandra’s Math
- Coordinates: 23.1973°N 88.4407°E

Architecture
- Type: Bengal temple architecture
- Completed: 18th century

Brindaban Chandra's Math, or Brindaban Chandra Math, is a complex of 17th–18th century temples at Guptipara in Hooghly district in the Indian state of West Bengal.

== Geography ==
Cities and towns in the Chinsurah subdivision (except Polba Dadpur and Dhaniakhali CD Blocks) in Hooghly district
M: municipal city/ town, CT: census town, R: rural/ urban centre,
Owing to space constraints in the small map, the actual locations in a larger map may vary slightly

=== Location ===
Guptipara is 74.6 km from Howrah station on the Howrah-Katwa line.

Those travelling by road from Kolkata can get on to State Highway 6 from somewhere suitable in Howrah district, and travel to Guptipara via Jirat.

Note: The map presents some of the notable locations in the subdivision (partly). All places marked in the map are linked in the larger full-screen map.

== The temples ==
Arranged in a quadrangle, enclosed within a high wall in the Brindaban Chandra Math, are the four temples dedicated to Chaitanyadev (Chaitanya-Nityananda), Brindabanchandra (Radha-Krishna and Jagannath), Ramchandra (Rama, Sita, Lakshmana and Hanuman) and Krishnachandra (Radha-Krishna).

According to David McCutchion, the jor-bangla temple of Chaitanya in the Brindaban Chandra Math is the earliest Bangla-style temple still standing. It was built during the reign of Akbar (1542–1605). The at-chala Brindabanchndra temple was built in 1801. The eka-ratna Ramchandra temple was built in the 17th century. The last temple has a rich terracotta façade.

The Bridaban Chandra Math complex at Guptipara is an ASI listed monument.

== Brindaban Chandra’s Math picture gallery ==
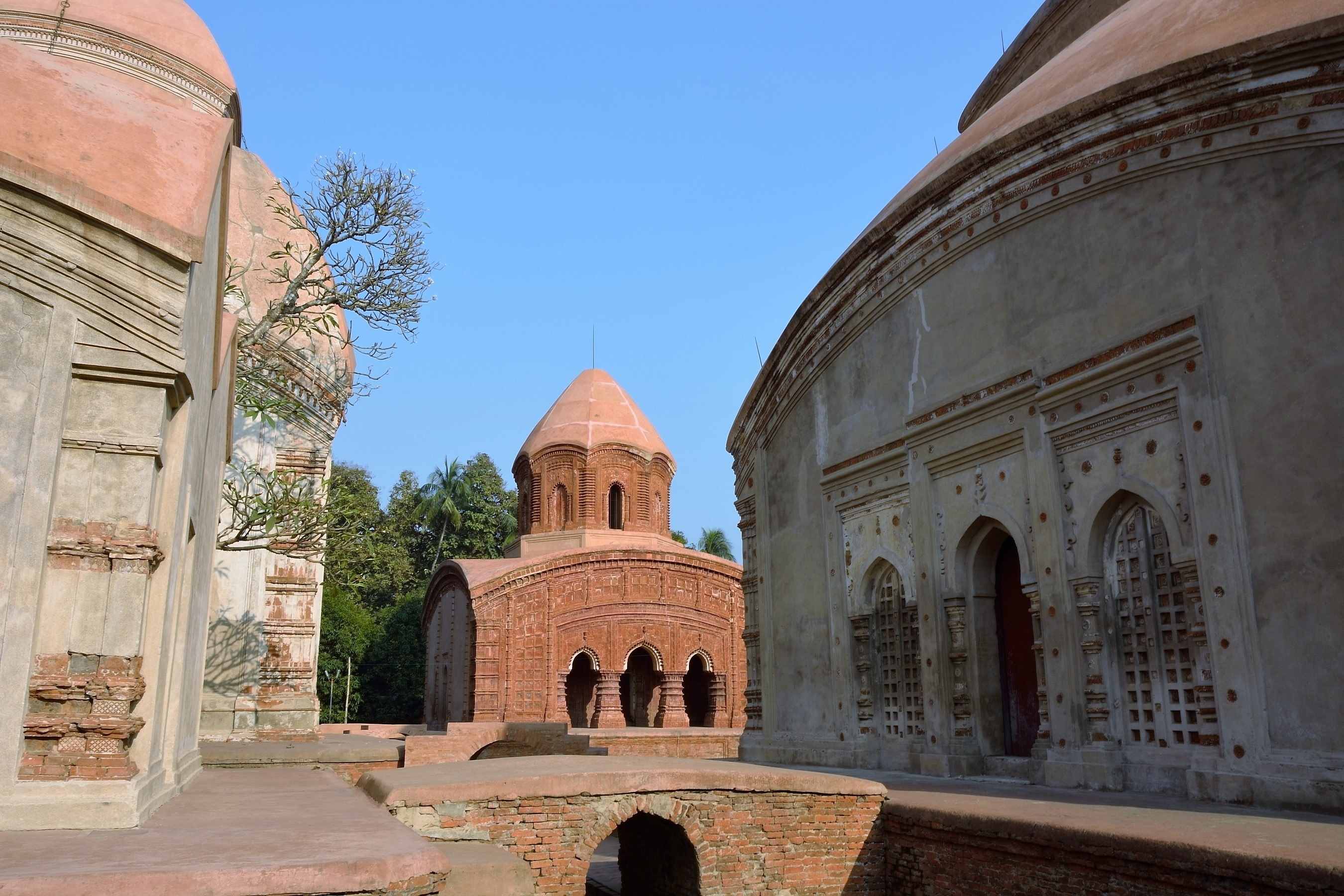
The temple complex

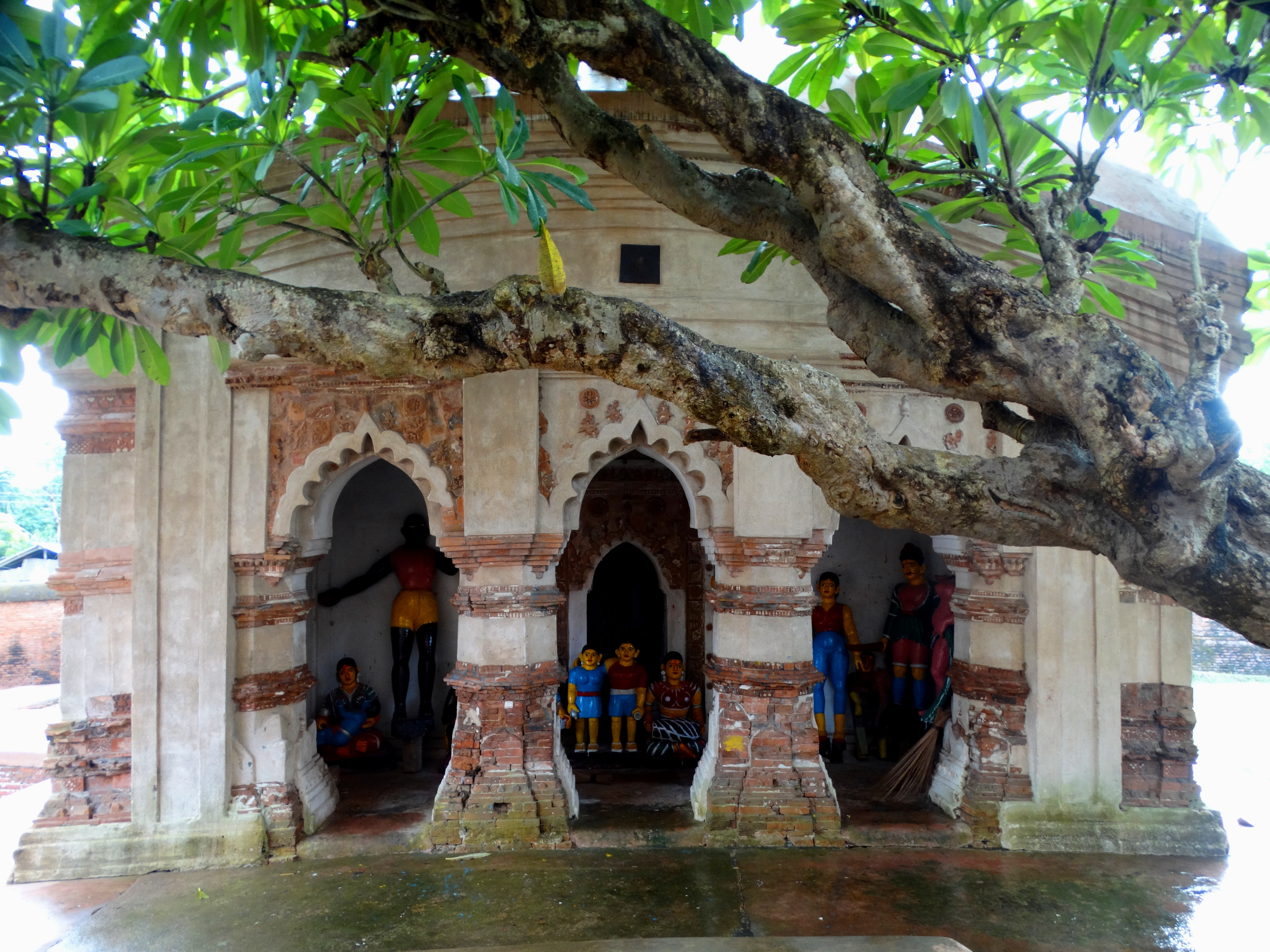
Chaitanya temple

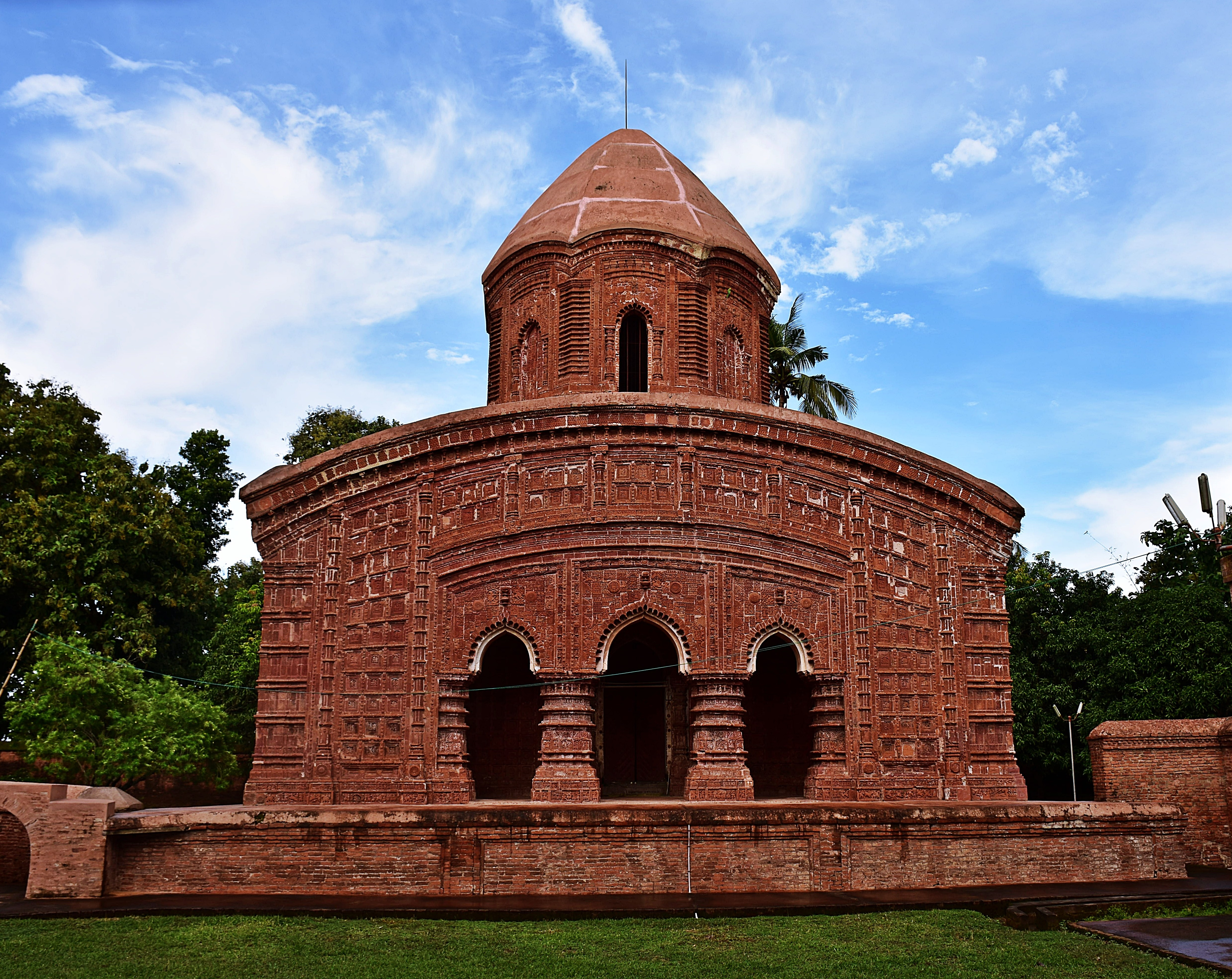
Ramchandra temple

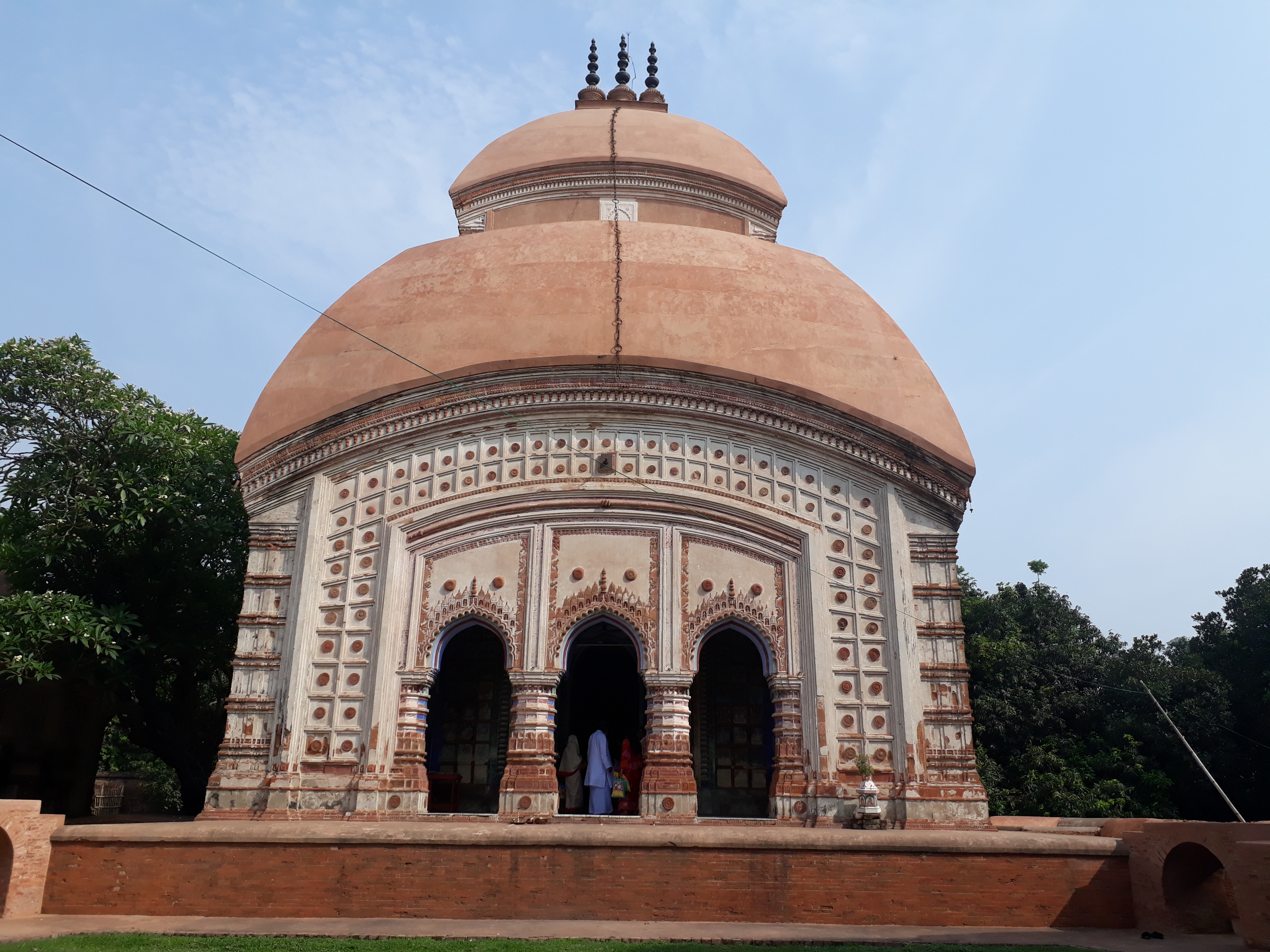
Brindaban Chandra temple

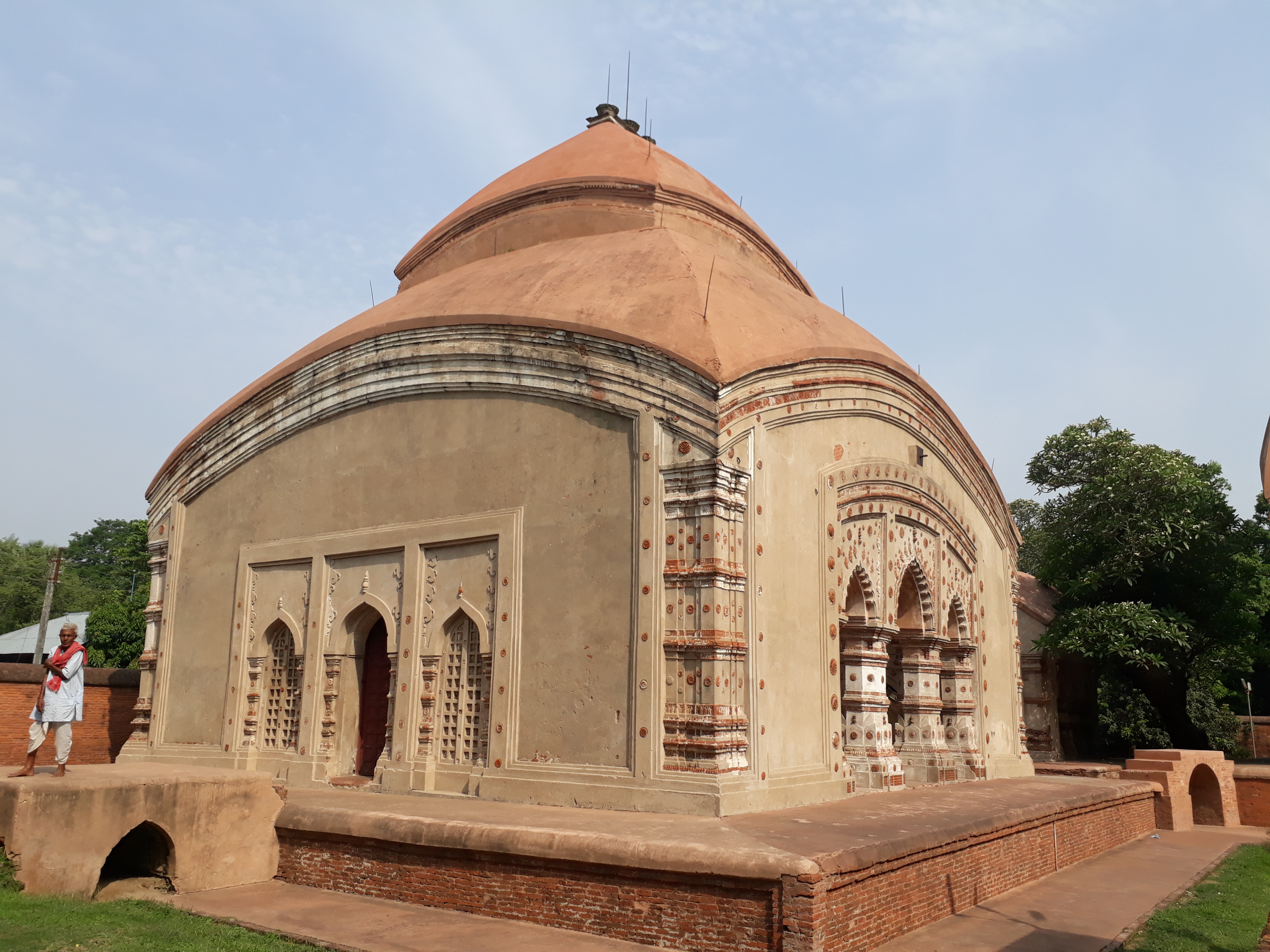
Krishnachandra temple

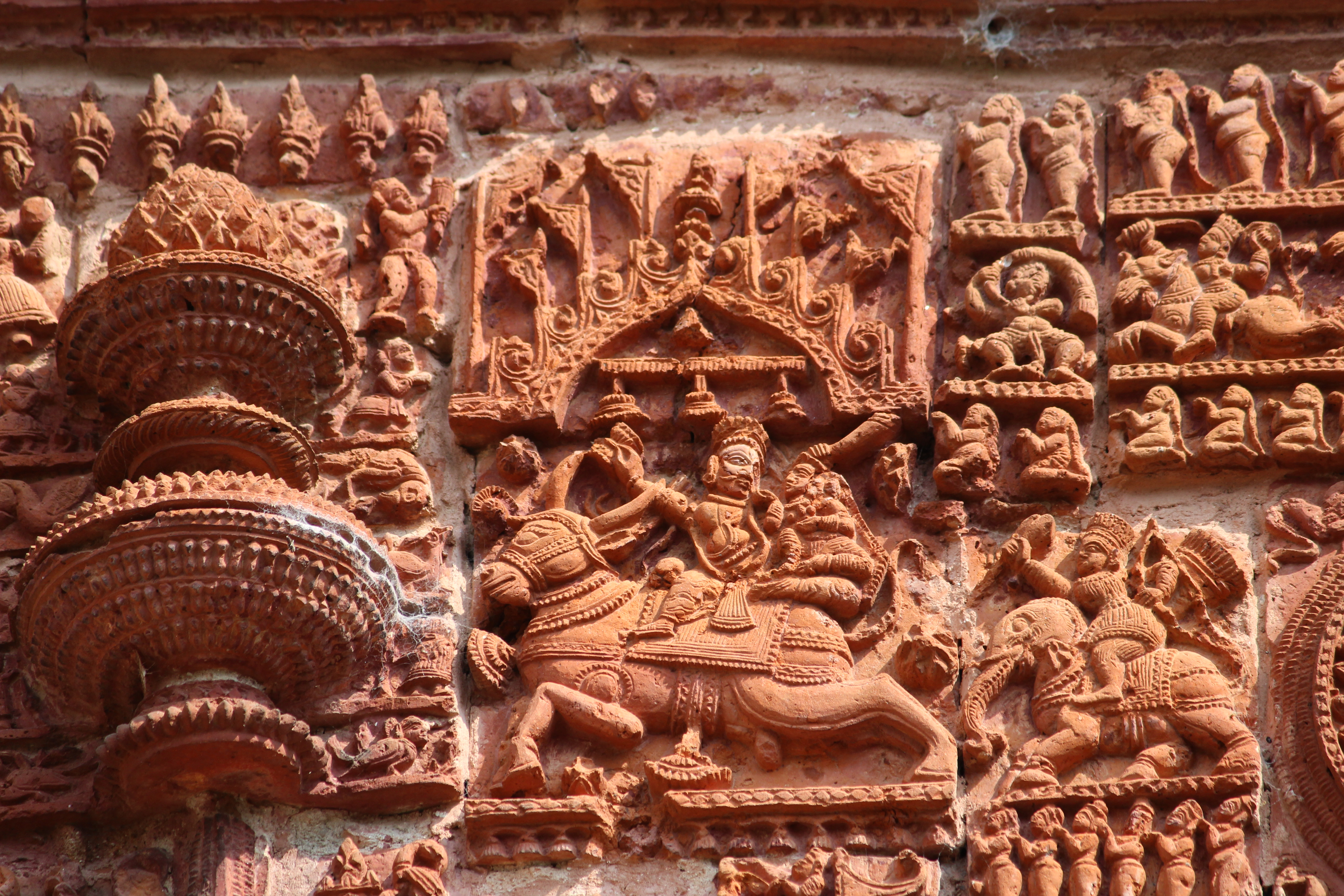
Terracotta in Ramchandra temple

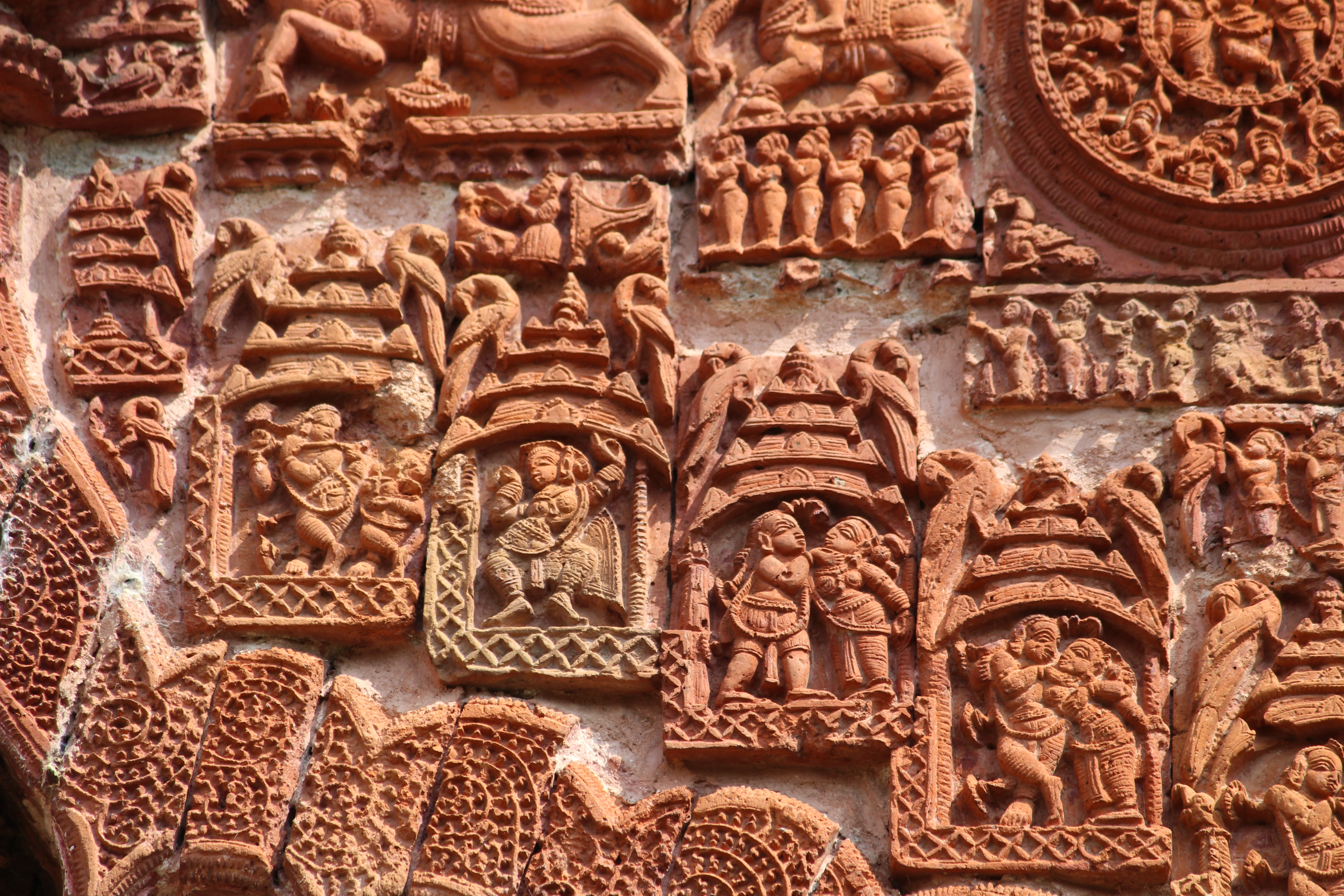
Terracotta in Ramchandra temple

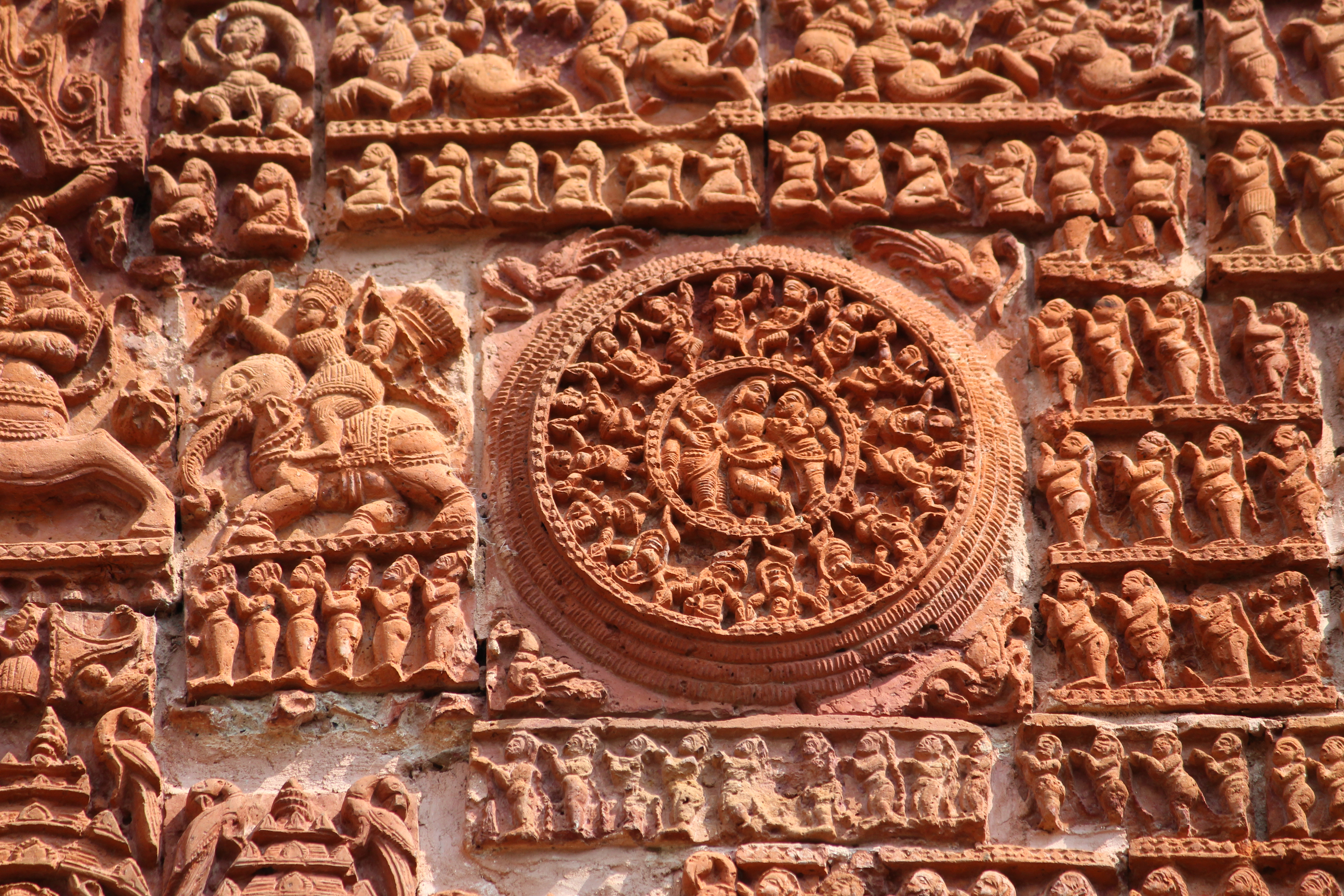
Terracotta in Ramchandra temple

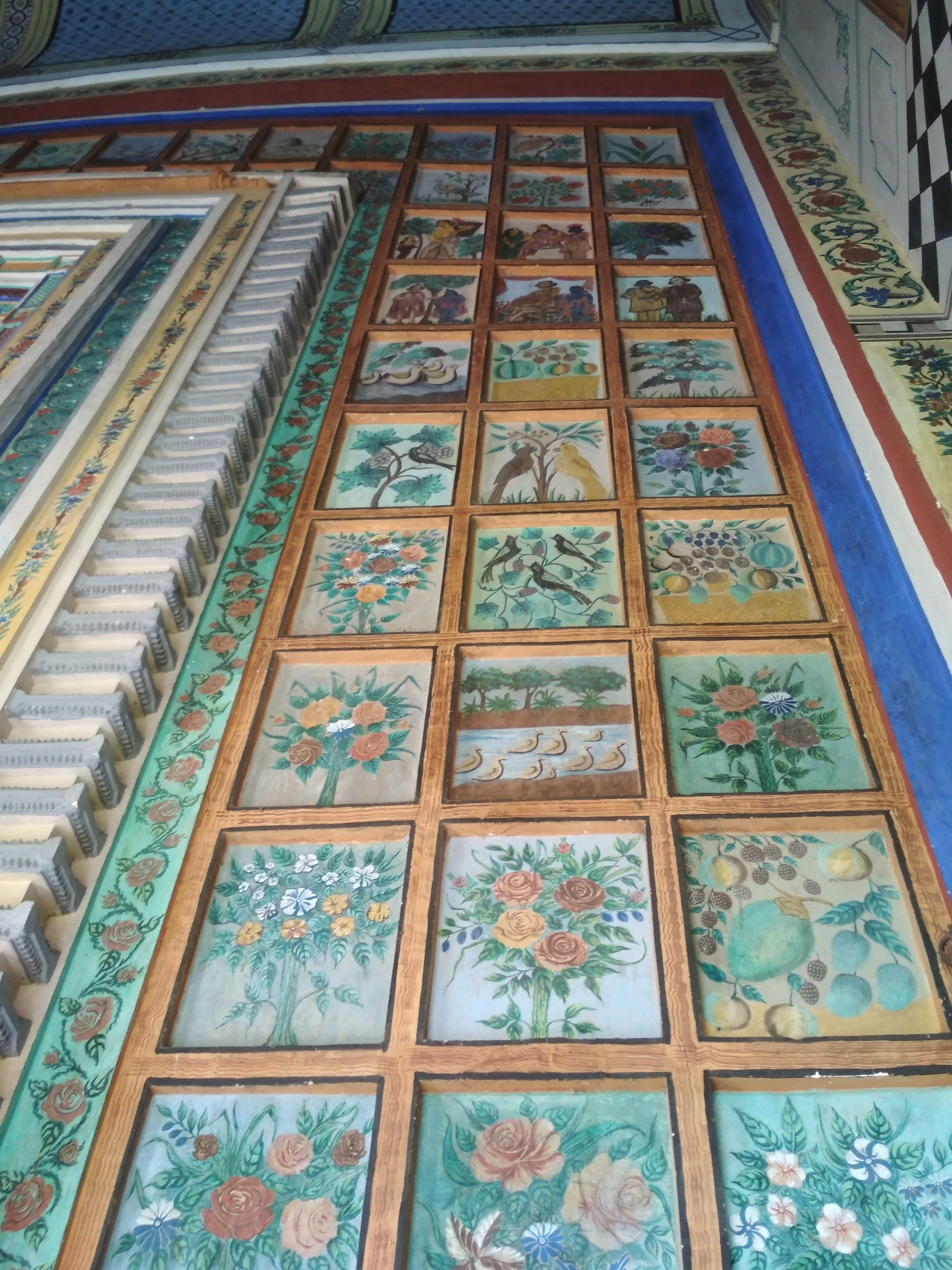
Design around door

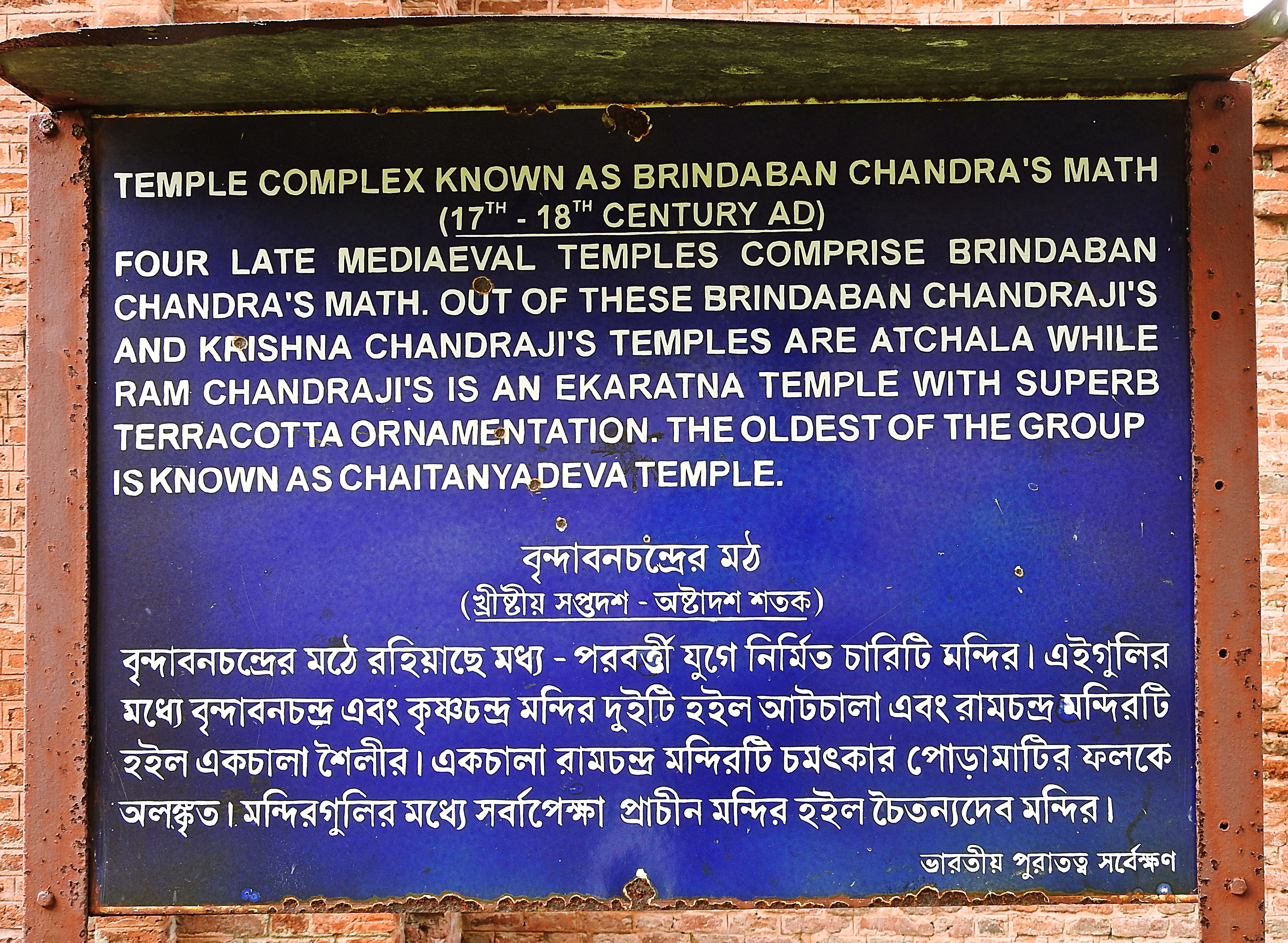
The information board
