= Sripur, Hooghly =

Sripur
- Census Town
- Location in West Bengal, India Sripur (India)
- Coordinates: 23.117844°N 88.467278°E
- Country: India
- State: West Bengal
- District: Hooghly

Population (2011)
  - Total: 7,224

Languages
  - Official: Bengali, English
- Time zone: UTC+5:30 (IST)
- Telephone code: 03454
- Vehicle registration: WB
- Lok Sabha constituency: Hooghly
- Vidhan Sabha constituency: Balagarh
- Website: hooghly.gov.in

Sripur is a census town in Balagarh CD Block in Chinsurah subdivision of Hooghly district in the Indian state of West Bengal.

== Geography ==
Cities and towns in the Chinsurah subdivision (except Polba Dadpur and Dhaniakhali CD Blocks) in Hooghly district
M: municipal city/ town, CT: census town, R: rural/ urban centre,
Owing to space constraints in the small map, the actual locations in a larger map may vary slightly

=== Location ===
Sripur is located at 23.117844°N 88.467278°E.

The Balagarh CD Block is mostly part of the Hooghly Flats, one of the three natural regions in the district composed of the flat alluvial plains that form a part of the Gangetic Delta. The region is a narrow strip of land along the 80 km long stretch of the Hooghly River, that forms the eastern boundary of the district.

=== Urbanisation ===
There are 13 statutory towns and 64 census towns in Hooghly district. The right bank of the Hooghly River has been industrialised over a long period. With foreigners dominating the area’s industry, trade and commerce for over two centuries, it is amongst the leading industrialised districts in the state. At the same time the land is fertile and agricultural production is significant.

In Chinsurah subdivision 68.63% of the population is rural and the urban population is 31.37%. It has 2 statutory and 23 census towns. In Chinsurah Mogra CD Block 64.87% of the population is urban and 35.13% is rural. Amongst the four remaining CD Blocks in the subdivision two were overwhelmingly rural and two were wholly rural.

The map alongside shows a portion of Chinsurah subdivision. All places marked in the map are linked in the larger full screen map.

== Demographics ==
As per 2011 Census of India Sripur had a total population of 7,224 of which 3,596 (50%) were males and 3,628 (50%) were females. Population below 6 years was 599. The total number of literates in Sripur was 5,478 (82.69% of the population over 6 years).
