= Guptipara =

Village in Hooghly, West Bengal, India

- Village
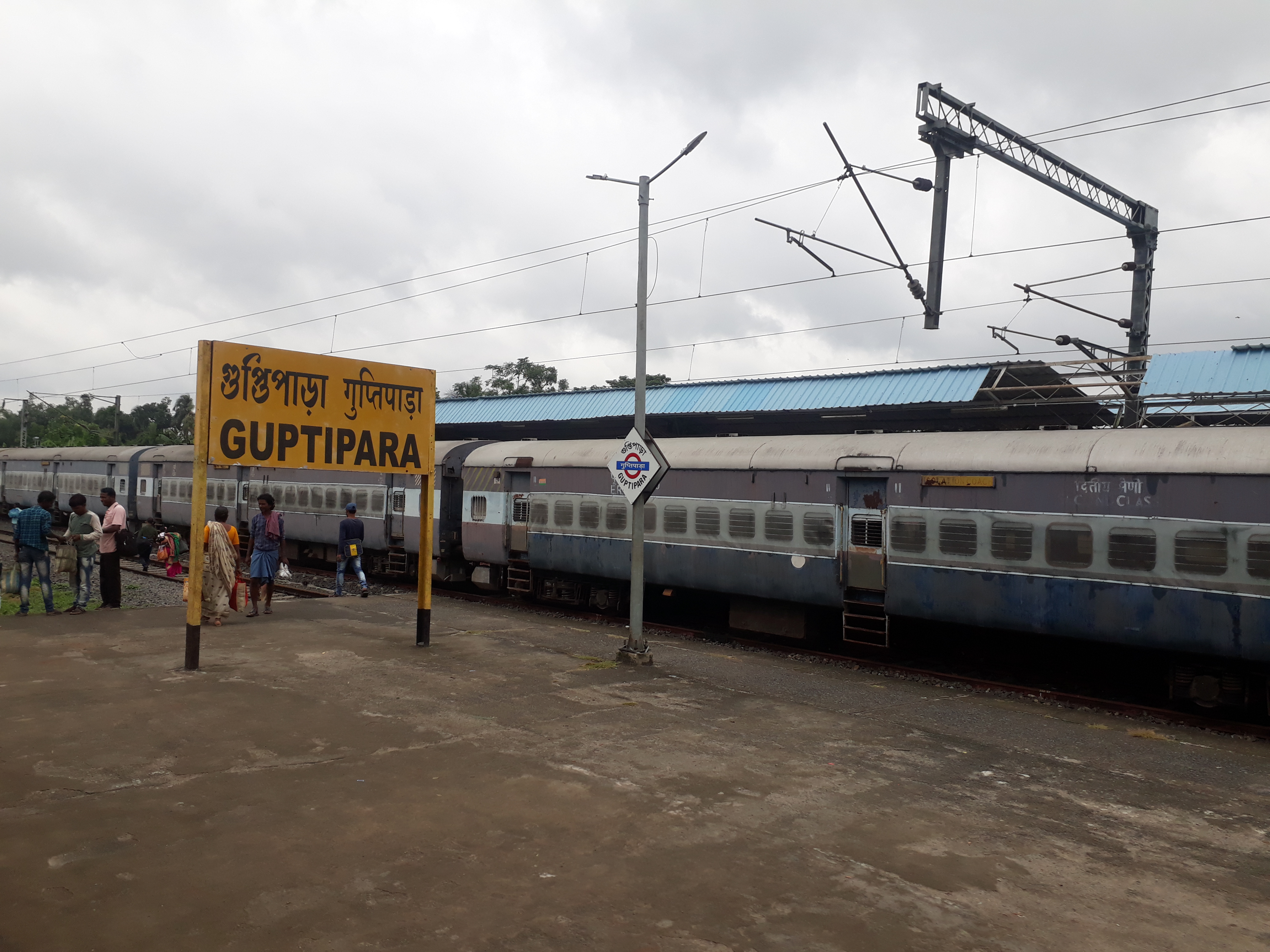

- Location in West Bengal, India Guptipara (India)
- Coordinates: 23.2103°N 88.4043°E
- Country: India
- State: West Bengal
- District: Hooghly

Population (2011)
  - Total: 2,169

Languages
  - Official: Bengali, English
- Time zone: UTC+5:30 (IST)
- Lok Sabha constituency: Hooghly
- Vidhan Sabha constituency: Balagarh

Guptipara is a village in Balagarh, a community development block that forms an administrative division in the Sadar subdivision of the Hooghly district in the Indian state of West Bengal.

== Geography ==
Cities and towns in the Chinsurah subdivision (except Polba Dadpur and Dhaniakhali CD Blocks) in Hooghly district
M: municipal city/ town, CT: census town, R: rural/ urban centre,
Owing to space constraints in the small map, the actual locations in a larger map may vary slightly

Guptipara sits beside the Hooghly River that divides Guptipara into two parts (Panchayat I and II are situated in the western part and Panchayat III is situated on the eastern side). Two oxbow lakes, Dekol and Dhama, are situated at the northern and southern end of Guptipara, respectively. Before the 15th century, many parts of Guptipara sank and were covered by lakes and rivers. (Note: Reverend Long wrote in 'Calcutta Review' 1846, 'The River (the Bhagirathi) formerly flowed behind Kalna where old Kalna now is, and it passed by Pyagachi, the remains of deep and large lakes.') The Dekol was connected with the Hooghly by the Muri Ganga channel, which can no longer be traced. During floods, water from the river enters through the Muri Ganga Path before it reunites with Dekol. An increase in population and farming, floods, the STKK road and railway lines define the landscape. The village is part of the Hooghly-Burdwan rice belt.

== History ==
Guptipara is the home of Bengal's first "Barowari" (English: publicly organized) Durga Puja which introduced Sri Bindhabasini Jagaddhatri Puja (Worshipping Devi Durga introduced by Lord Rama), with a club named Bindhyabasini. It is now known as Bindhyabasini Mata. In the 1760s, a group of men were stopped from taking part in the household Durga Puja of the ruling Sen family. In retaliation, twelve of these men formed a committee and organised a modern club culture called "Barowari Puja." A group of twelve Brahmins, after being denied entry to a private Durga Puja at a wealthy household, decided to organize their own public celebration. "Bāro" (Twelve) and "yāri" (friends/companions): The name "Barowari" is believed to stem from "bāro yāri" (twelve friends), symbolizing their collective effort to create a public festival. Opinions vary about the year of commencement of the Barowari puja. Some believe it to be 1760 while others claim it to be 1790.

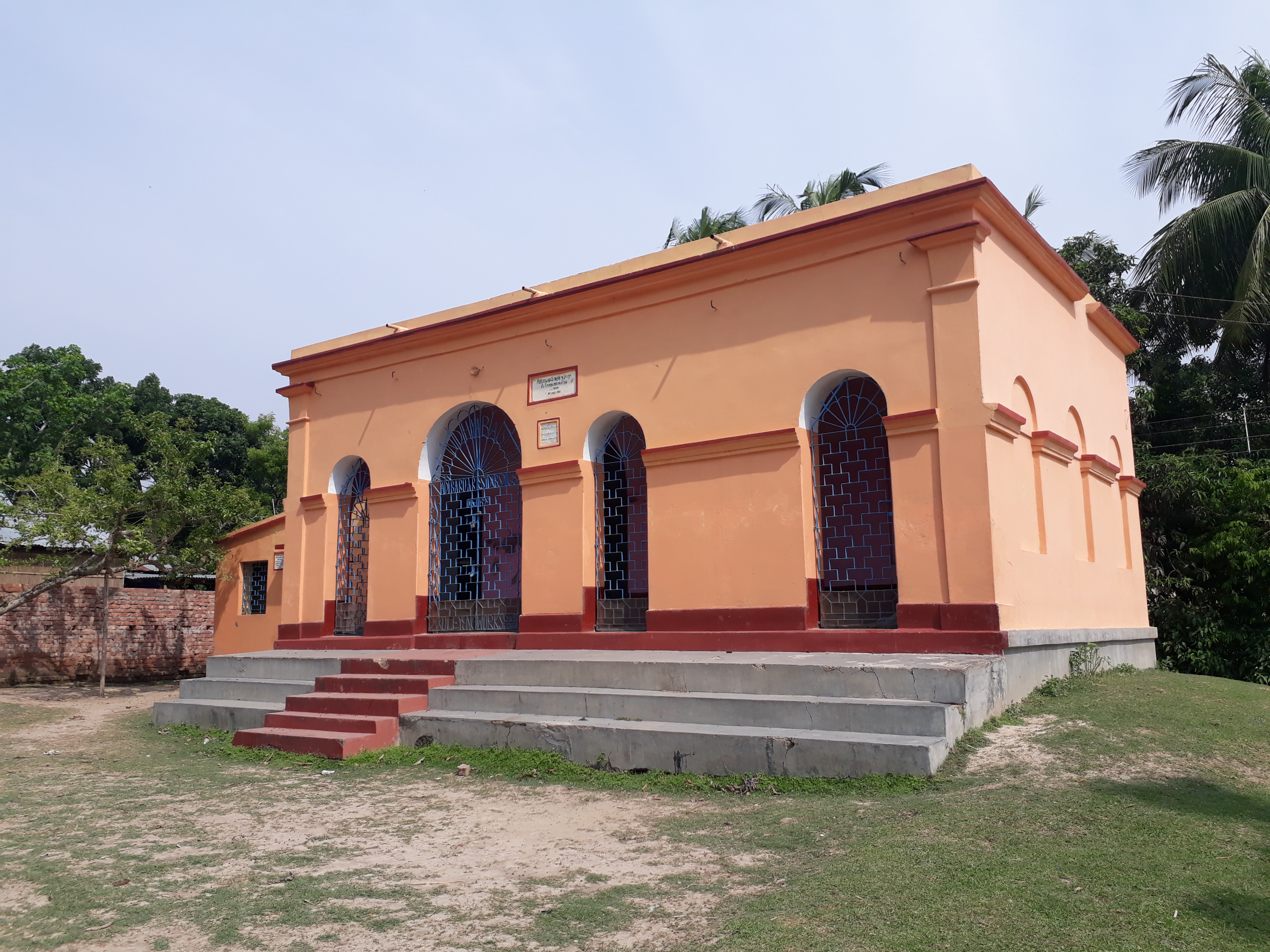
Bindhyabasini Temple, Guptipara. The place of first Barwari puja of Undivided Bengal

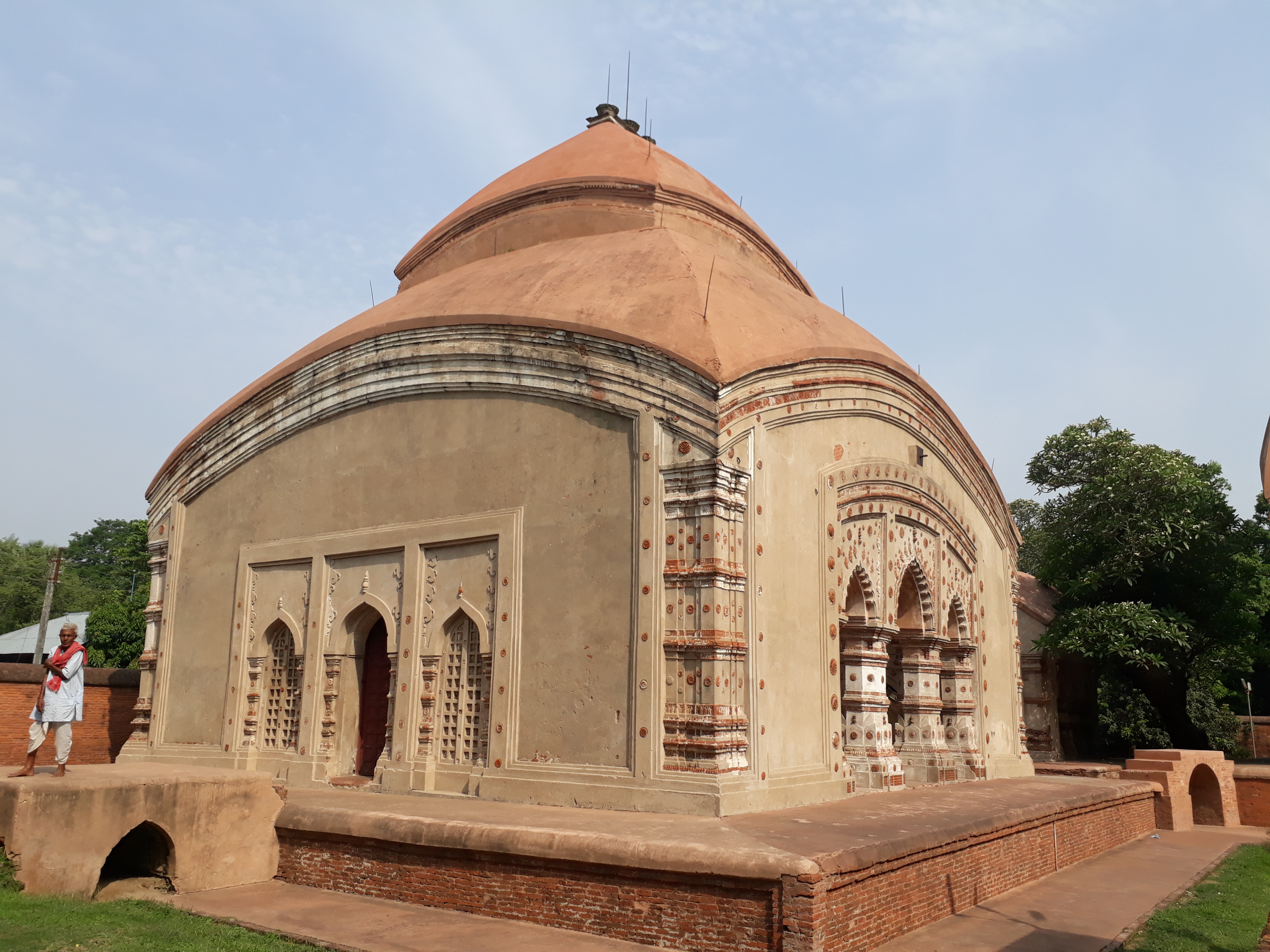
Krishnachandra Temple, Guptipara, Hooghly

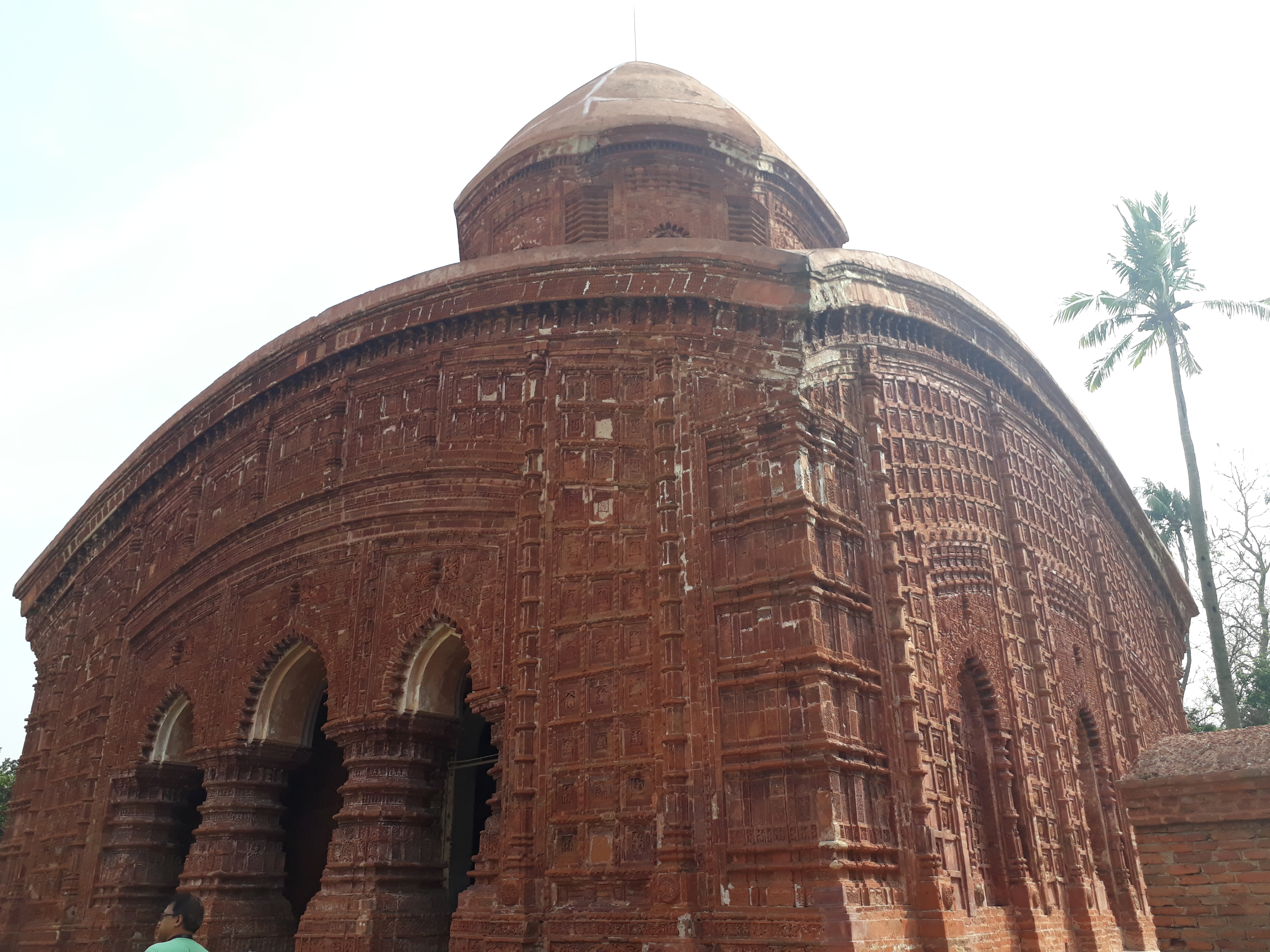
Ramchandra Temple

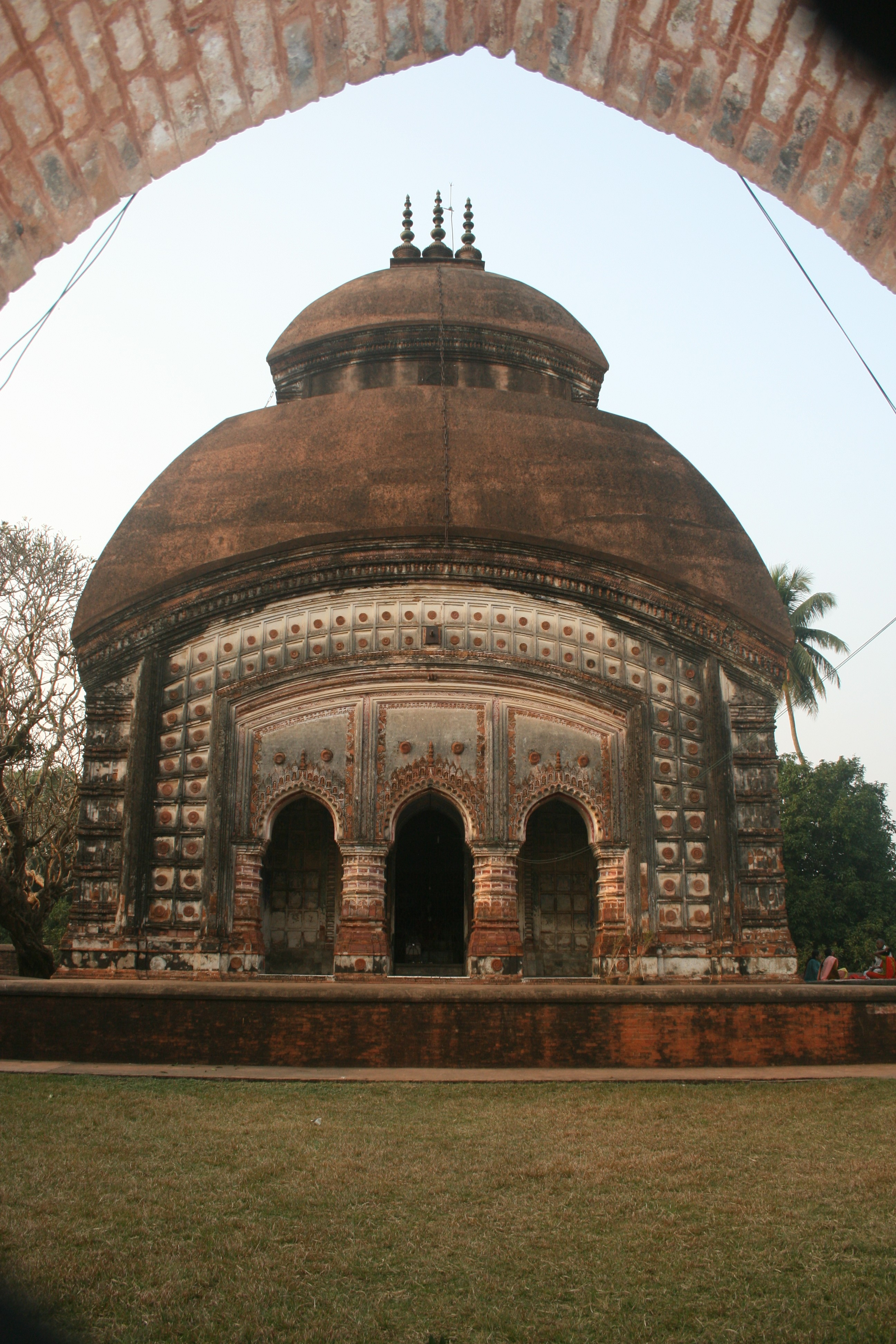
Vrindabanchandra Temple

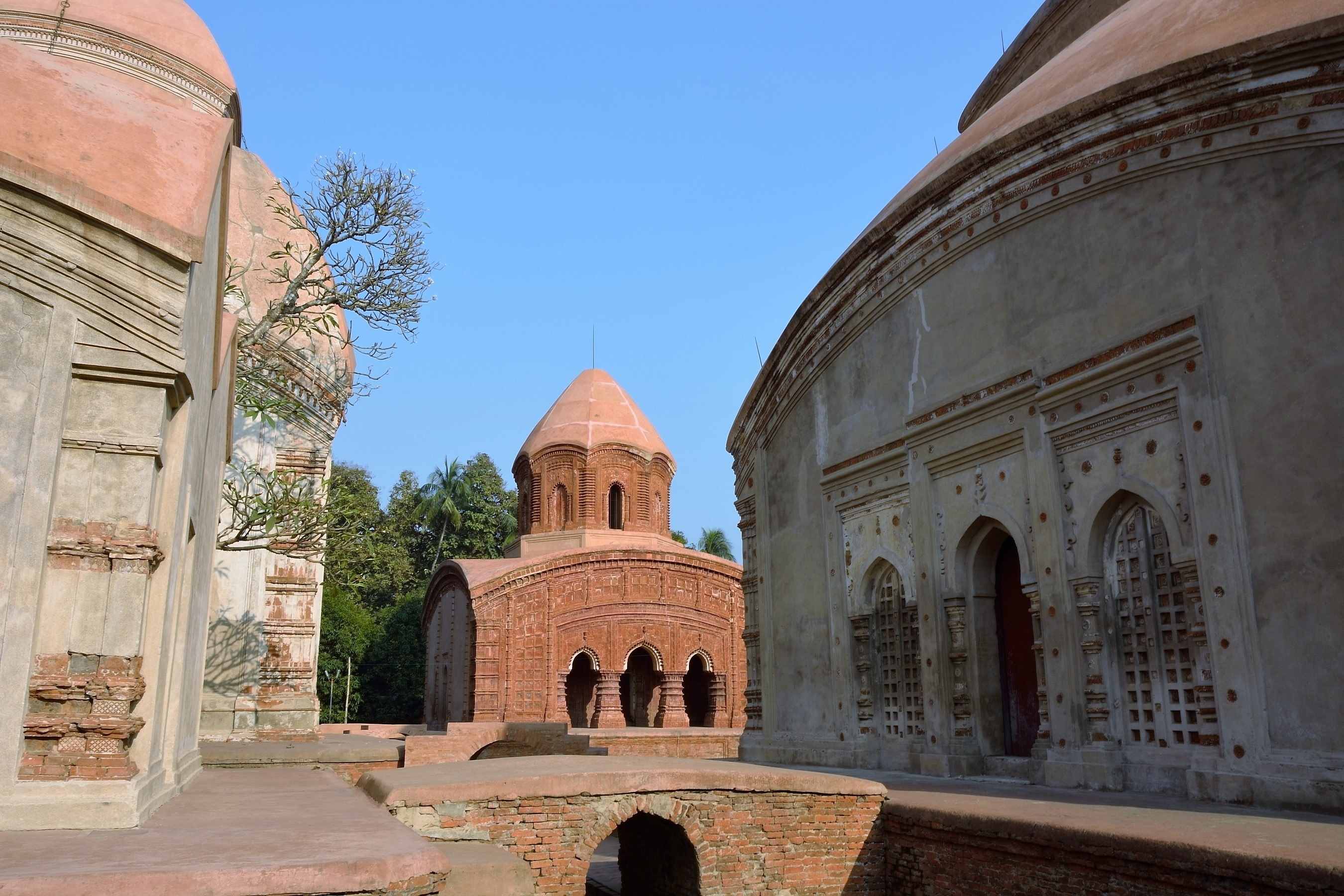
The temple complex in Guptipara, Hooghly

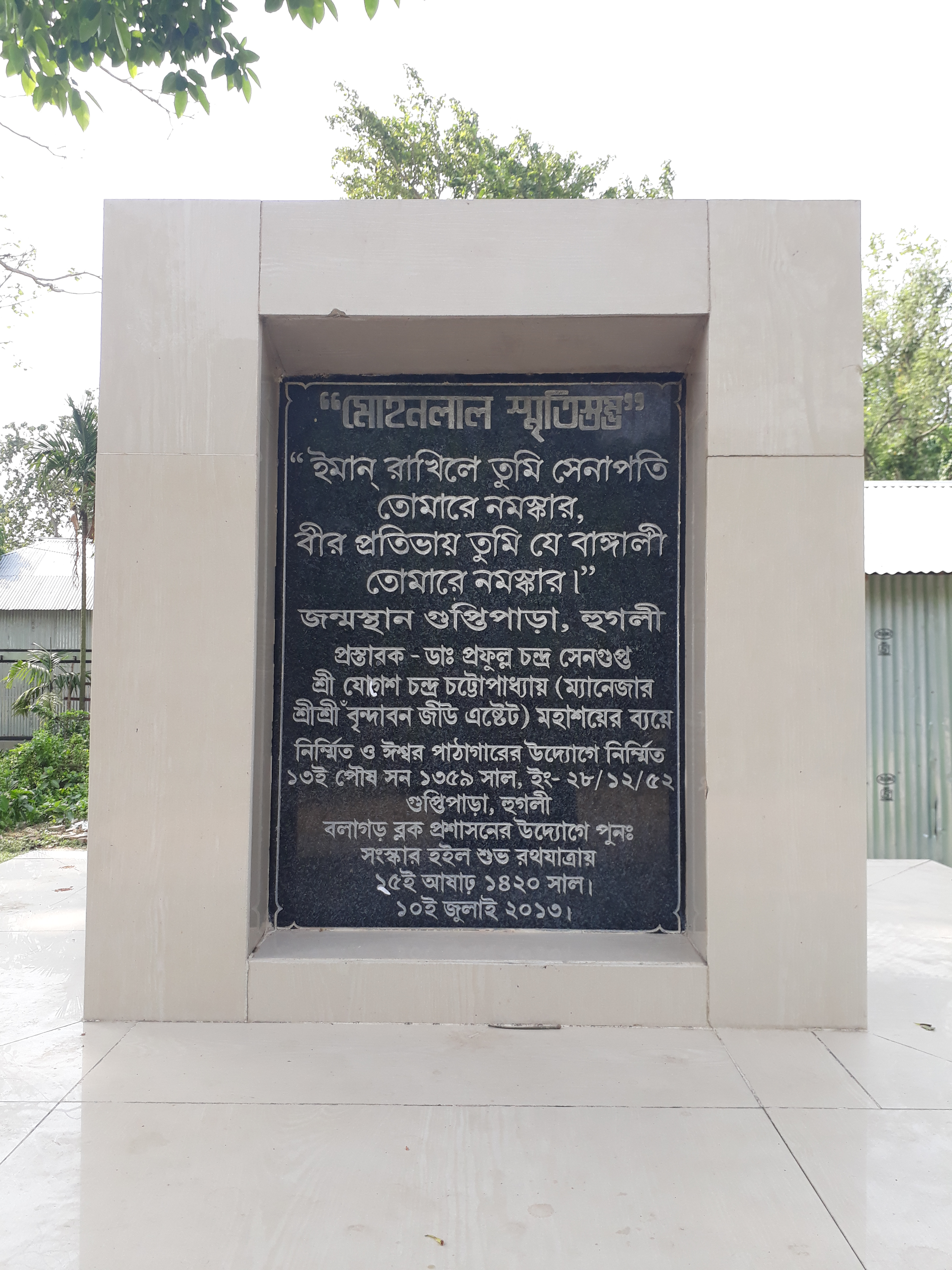
In Mohanlal's Memory

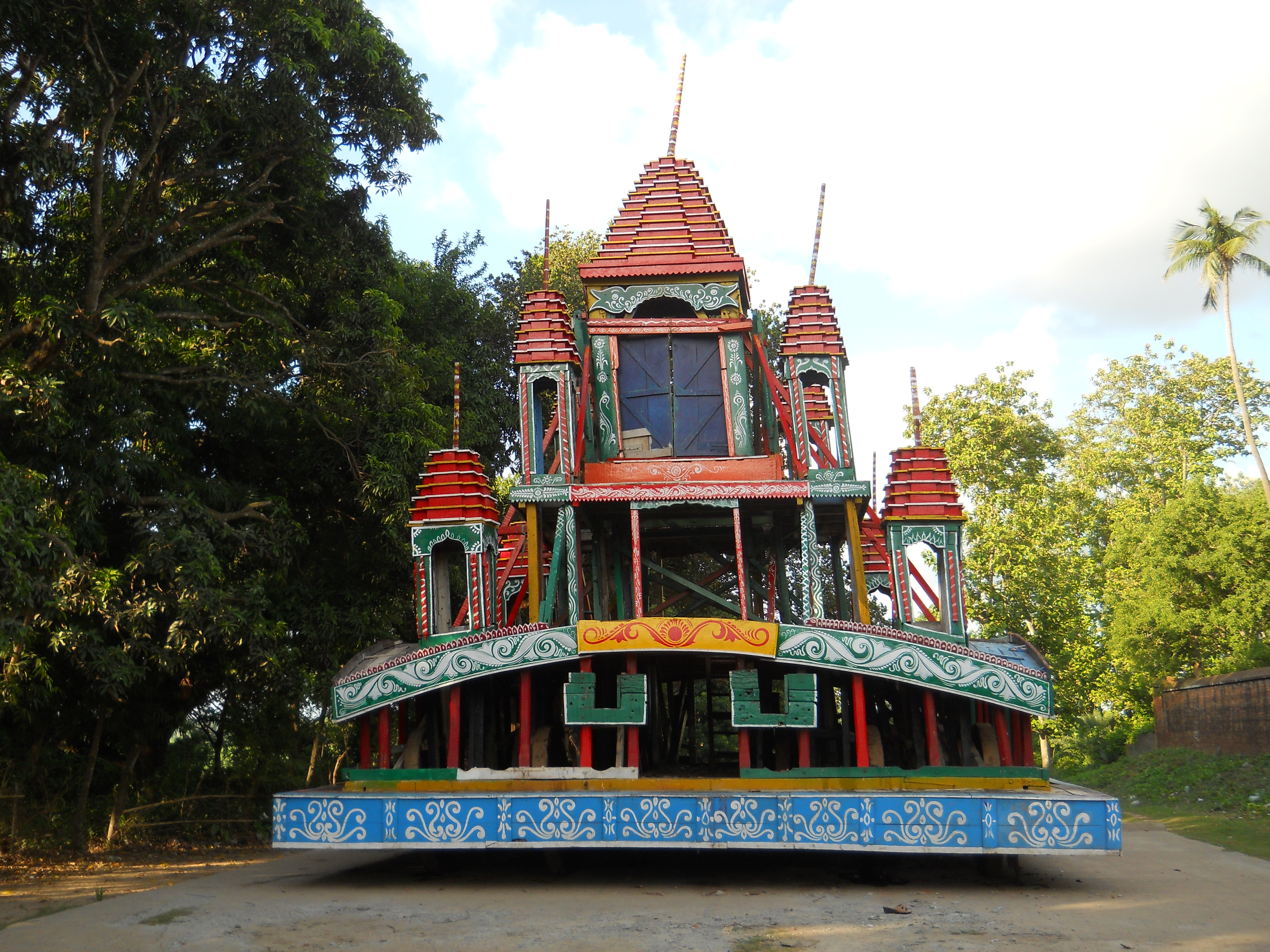
Chariot of Guptipara

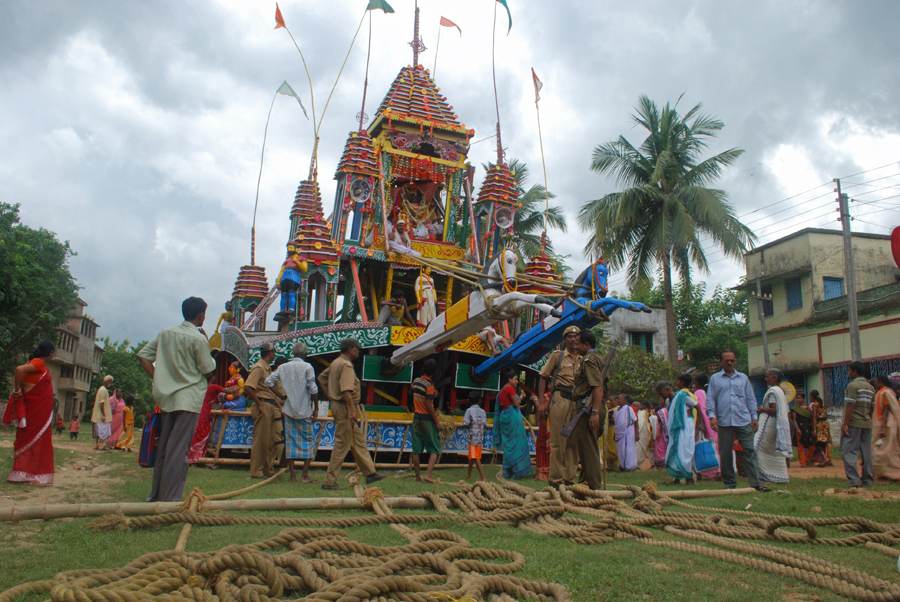
Guptipara Rath

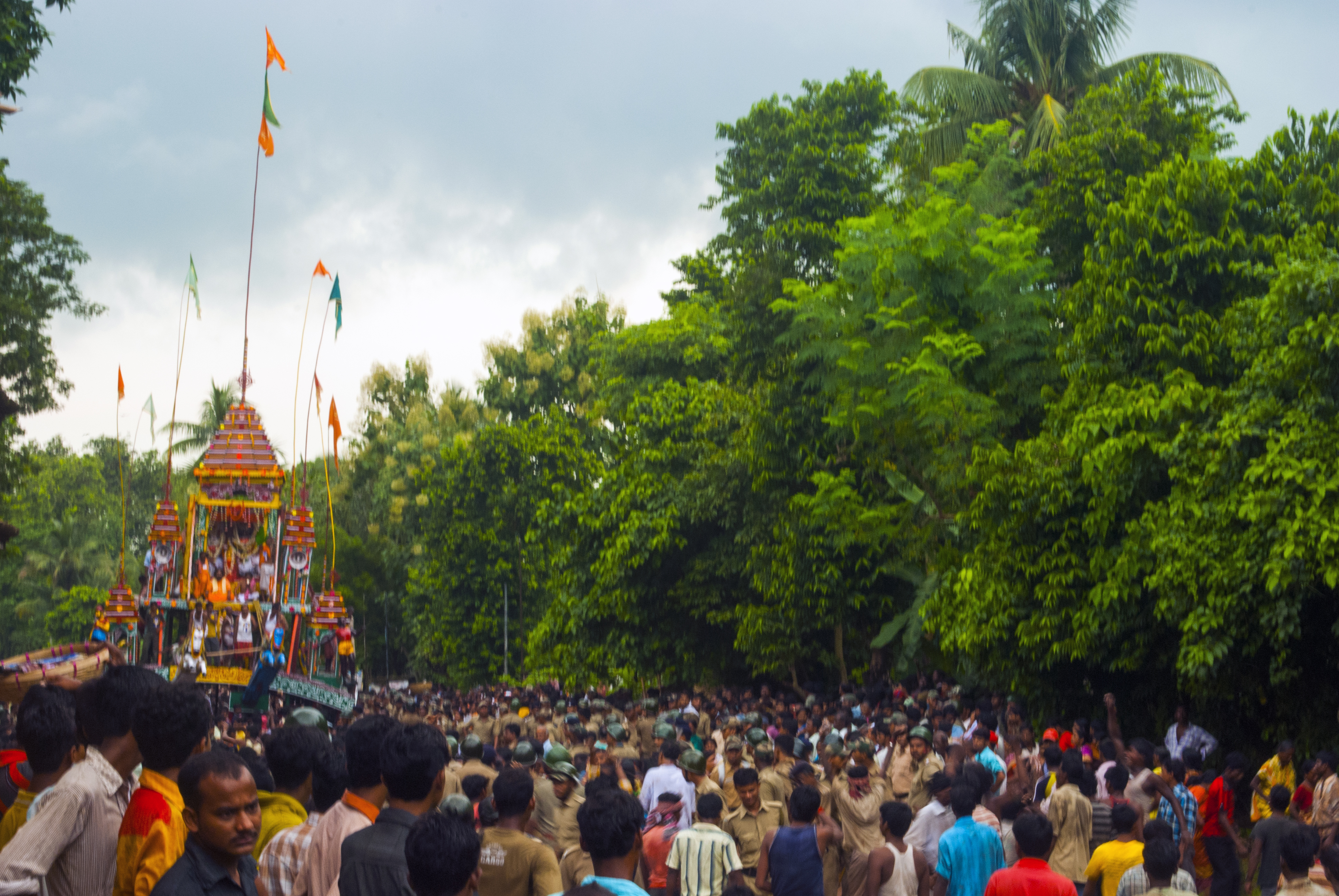
Pulling of the chariot during ultorath

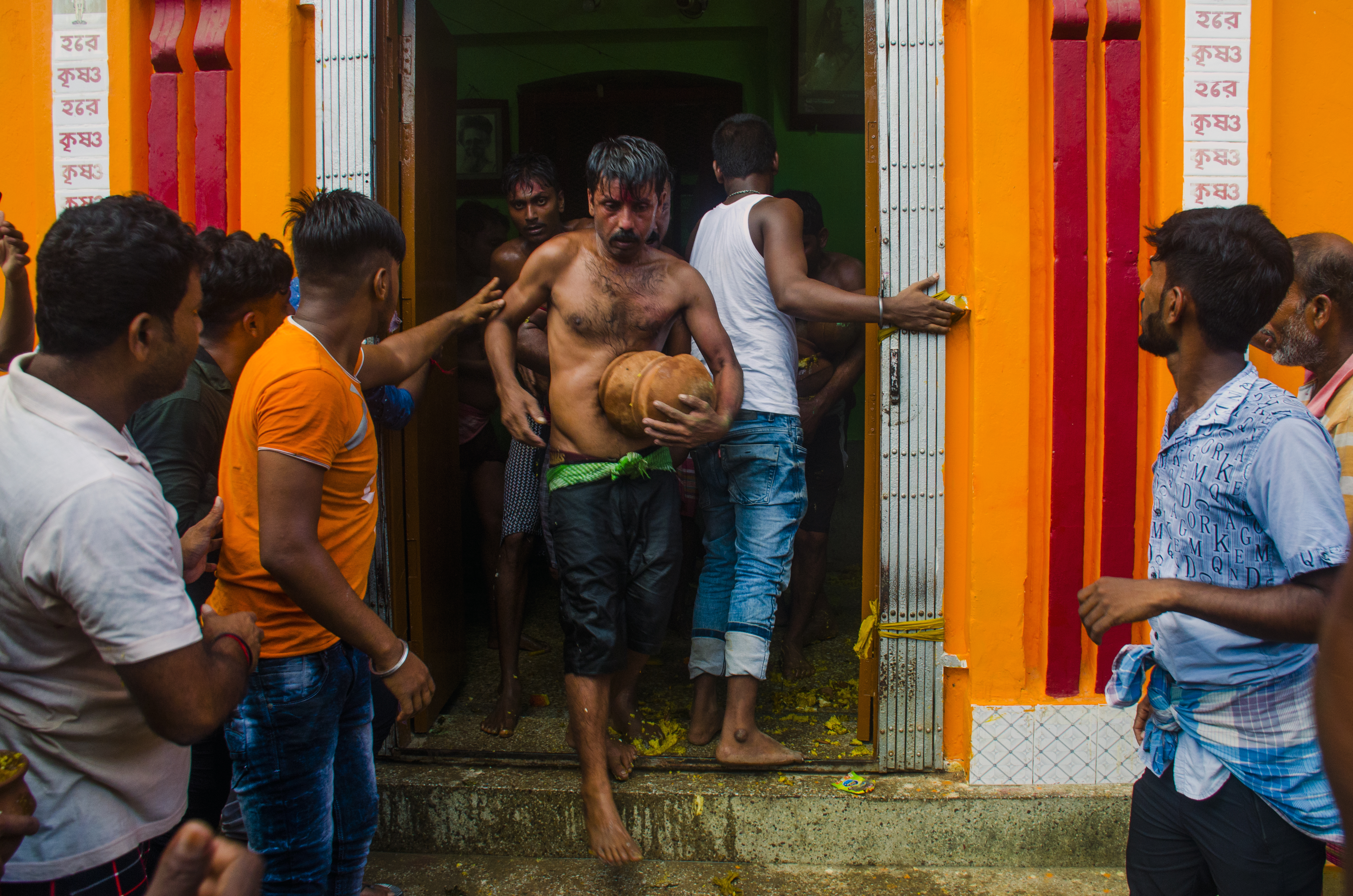
Devotees come out temple during Bhandar Loot

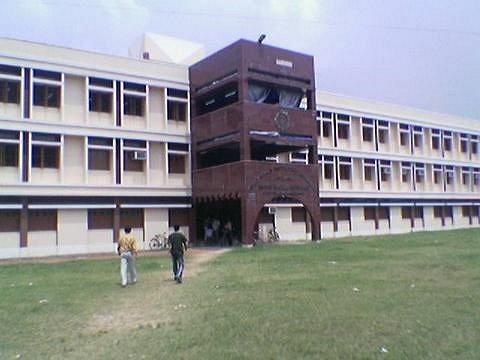
Saroj Mohon Institute of Technology

Guptipara was one of the main places in ancient India where the "Sanskrit Toles" and Pandith lived. "Pathmahal," "Raghu Nath" Mandir, and Mela were situated throughout Guptipara in large numbers. Many old manuscripts and books are preserved in the "Sisir Bani Mandir Pathagar", the government library.

Guptipara is the birthplace of folk singer Bhola Moira, and of Diwan Mohanlal, the Commander in Chief of King Siraj ud-Daulah.

The temple complex at Brindaban Chandra's Math houses four Vaishnava Temples: Chaitanya, Brindabanchandra, Ramchandra and Krishnachandra. The Ramchandra Temples contain many terracotta works, and the structures bear characteristics of the Bengal school of architecture, with carvings depicting scenes from the epics and Puranas.

Guptipara was a citadel of Vaishnavite culture. Even today, residents observe Ras, Dol and Ratha-Yatra, which is Guptipara's greatest festival. The Guptipara ratha (English: ceremonial chariot), one of the tallest and oldest rathas in West Bengal, is said to cover the second-longest distance in India after that of Puri. On the day before the Ultorath (the homecoming of Lord Bridabanchandra), a festival known as "Bhandarloot" is held in Guptipara. Many people across Eastern India come gather there to pull the ropes of the ratha.

Guptipara is the home of the first branded Bengali "Gupo sandesh," a special kind of sweetmeat.

== Demographics ==
As per the 2011 Census of India, the population was 2,169, of which 1,090 (50%) were males and 1,079 (50%) were females. 192 of the population was below age 6. The literacy rate was 83.92% of the population over age 6.

== Transport ==
Guptipara can be reached from Kolkata or Howrah on the suburban train service. Local trains from Howrah, Katwa and Bandel stop at Guptipara railway station. Train service is also available from Sealdah. Guptipara is 74 km (46 mi) from Howrah and 35 km (22 mi) from Bandel on the Bandel–Katwa Branch Line.

Guptipara is connected by roadways, including the Assam (S.T.K.K.) Road.

Buses are available from district headquarters Chinsurah & Kalna (Kalna–Chinsurah 8 No. Private Bus), Burdwan (Guptipara–Burdwan) and Tarakeswar (Guptipara–Tarakeswar).

Ferry service to Guptipara is available from Shantipur and Tarapur.

Autorickshaw services are available from Jirat (Jirat–Guptipara) and from Kalna (Kalna–Guptipara).

== Sports ==
The two main sports clubs are over one-hundred and twenty years old: The Gupitara Football Club and the Gupitara Premier League. The Guptipara Football Club, Aida Milani Sangha, and the Guptipara Cricket Association arrange regular tournaments. The Guptipara Premier League in cricket received some fame and came into the spotlight of Bengal Media. These clubs organize football tournaments at Guptipara.

== Administration ==
Guptipara is divided into three administrative parts, or gram panchayats. Guptipara I covers areas like Guptipara Station Road, Satgachia, Bandhagachi, Pathmahal, Mirdanga, Tengripara, and Saradanagar villages. Guptipara II covers the largest area with Manasatala, Pathakpukur, Beldanga, Kumorpara, Chutorpara, Baburdanga, Aryanagar, Rathsadak, Jamtala, Behula, Ghoshpara, Sondolpur, Rampur, Aida, and Baire, as well as many other small villages. Guptipara III covers Fultala, Char-Krishnabati, Benali, Shaktipur etc.

Guptipara is under The Hooghly Lok Sabha and Balagarh Vidhan Sabha.

=== Heads of Administration ===
- M.P. Rachana Banerjee
- MLA: Sumana Sarkar
- Zilla Parishad: Ashim Kumar Majhi
- Pradhan Guptipara -I:
- Pradhan Guptipara -II:
- Pradhan Guptipara -III:

== Education ==
=== College ===
- Saroj Mohan Institute of Technology

=== Higher Secondary schools ===
- Guptipara High School (est. 1890, Near Guptipara police outpost, Bhattacharya Para. Co-ed)
- Guptipara Girls High School (est. 1950, Hugli. Co-ed)

=== Secondary schools ===
- Satyabrata Balika Vidyalaya (Girls Only)
- Krishna Bati Char High School (Co-Ed)
- Satgachia High School (Co-Ed)
- Natagarh High School (Co-Ed)
- Sultanpur Alia Sr. Madarasah School (Co-Ed)
- Satgachia Balika Vidyalaya (Girls only)

=== Mission ===
1. Hindu Mission Boys Welfare Home

== Festivals and culture ==
Guptiparans celebrate several events: Ratha Yatra, Jagadhatri Puja, Durga Puja, Dol Yatra, Jhapan, Kali Puja and many local festivals, including Guptipara Rathayatra.

=== Ratha-Yatra ===
Ratha Yatra is the main attraction. At approximately 2 km, the Guptipara Ratha covers the second largest distance in India. It starts from the temple complex in Lord Brindaban Chandra Temple and stretches to Lord Gopal Temple at Borobazar, Guptipara. Approximately one million people gather there to celebrate the Ratha Yatra. On the eve of the Ulto Rath, Guptipara holds a unique ritual known as Bhandar Loot. During Bhandar Loot the bhog is not distributed but looted.

=== Jagaddhatri Puja ===
Barowari committees and houses organize Jagadhatri Puja. The main attraction is a firecracker competition and procession that takes place on the last evening of the Puja.

=== Durga Puja ===
Like other areas of Bengal, Guptipara hosts Durga Puja. Puja from the Sen's house is one of the oldest traditions in Bengal. The famous clubs who organize Durga Puja are United Club, Saradanagar New Young Star, Bandhagachi Barowari, Azad hind Club, SMIT, Jagarani Sangha, Durga Mandir, Nirbhik Sangha, Daspara Barowari, Bhumijpara Barowari, Swaralipi Club, Evergreen, Thakurpara Barowari, Aryanagar Barowari, and Sasthitala Barowari. At least 100 small and big pujas have been organized here.

=== Kali Puja ===
The main attractions are Desh Kali Puja & Mashal Kali Puja (Deceits Kali). Flares are often used in the procession of Mashal Kali Puja.
