= Jirat railway station =

Railway station in Jirat, India

Jirat
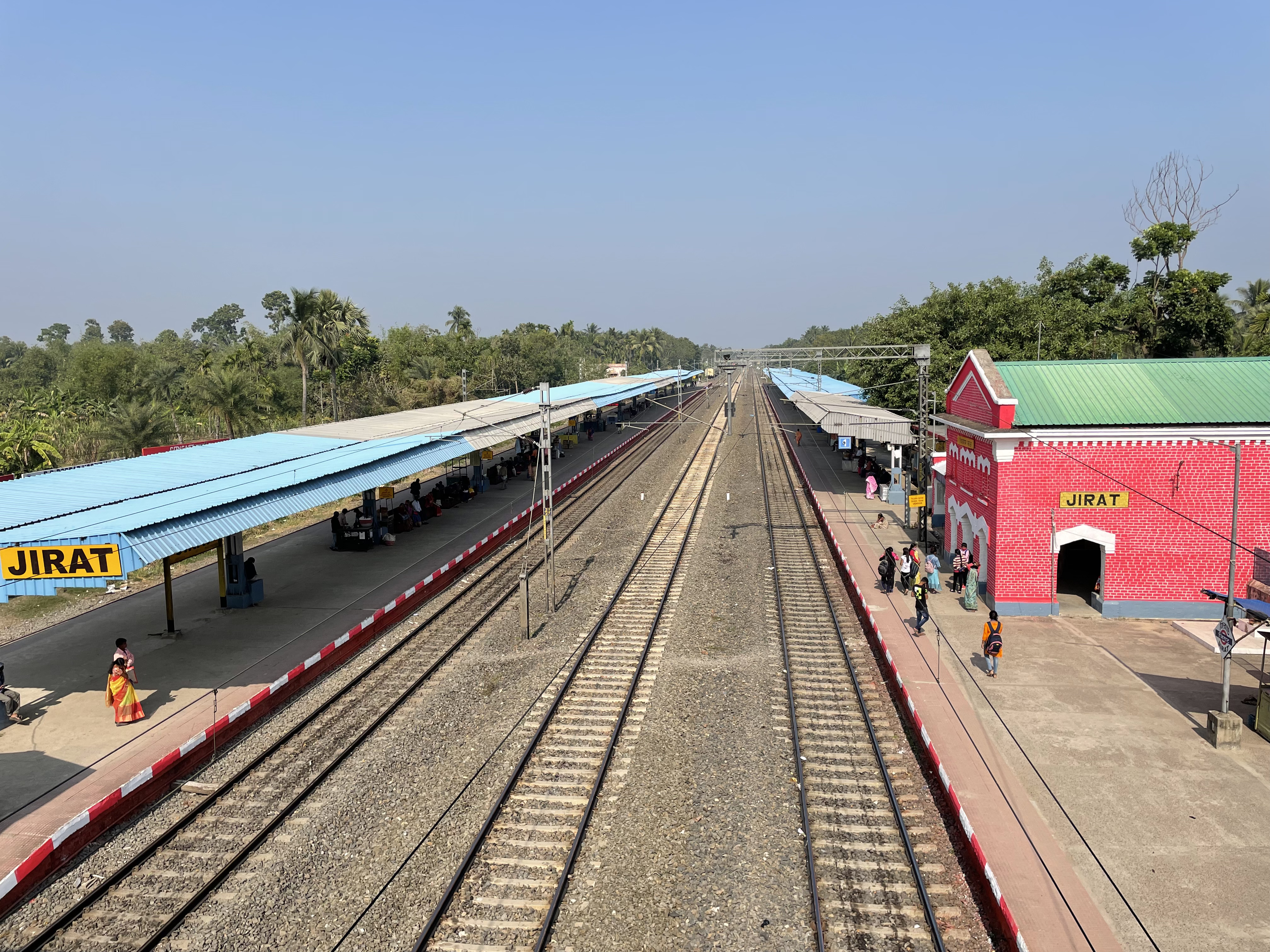
- Jirat railway station

General information
- Location: Kaliagarh, Jirat, Hooghly, West Bengal; India
- Coordinates: 23.097635°N 88.461351°E
- Elevation: 15 m (49 ft)
- System: Indian Railways station and Kolkata Suburban Railway station
- Owner: Indian Railways
- Operator: Eastern Railway
- Platforms: 3
- Tracks: 4

Construction
- Structure type: Standard (on ground station)
- Parking: No
- Cycle facilities: No

Other information
- Status: Functioning
- Station code: JIT
- Zone(s): Eastern Railway
- Division(s): Howrah

Services
Preceding station	Kolkata Suburban Railway	Following station
Khamargachi towards Howrah Junction	Eastern Line Bandel–Katwa line	Balagarh towards Katwa Junction
Route map
Location
- Location within West Bengal Location within India

Jirat railway station is a railway station on Bandel–Katwa line connecting from Bandel to Katwa, and under the jurisdiction of Howrah railway division of Eastern Railway zone. It is situated at Kaliagarh, Jirat, Hooghly in the Indian state of West Bengal. Number of EMU local and passenger trains stop at Jirat railway station.

== History ==
The Hooghly–Katwa Railway constructed a line from Bandel to Katwa in 1913. This line including Jirat railway station was electrified in 1994–96 with 25 kV overhead line.
