= Jirat =

Town in West Bengal, India

Jirat Bengali pronunciation: [jirit]
- Census Town
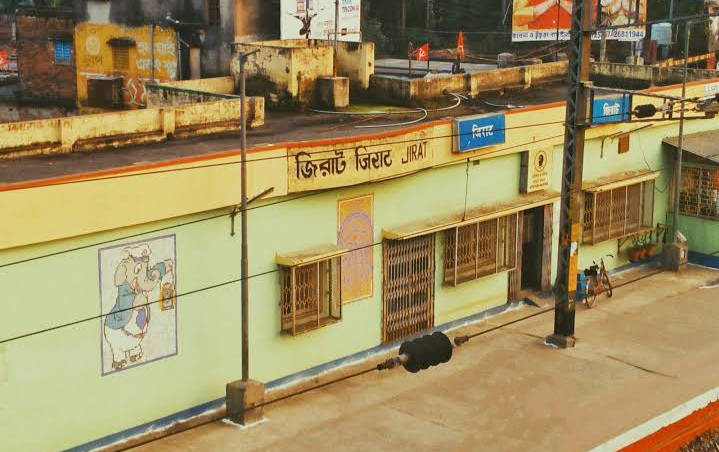
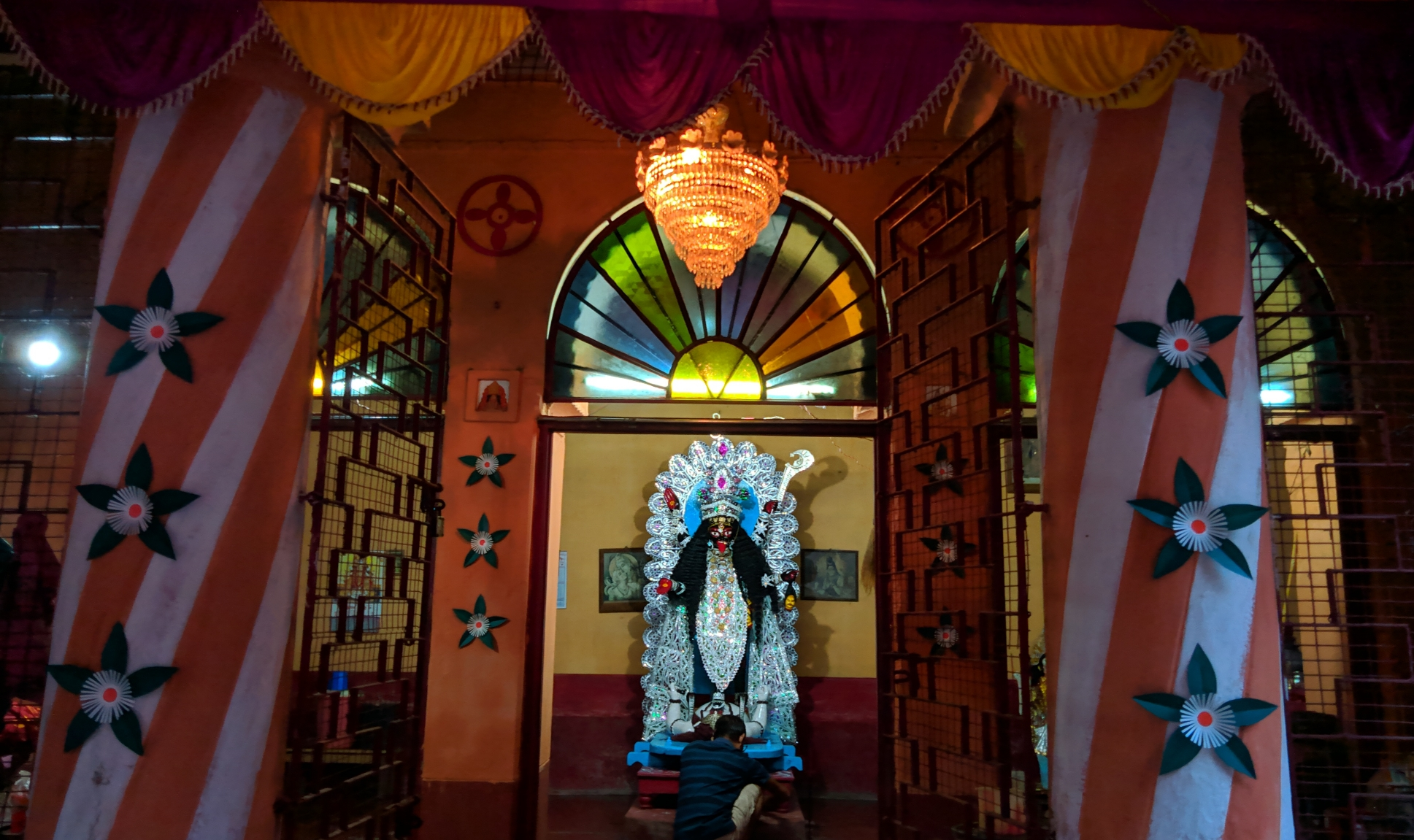
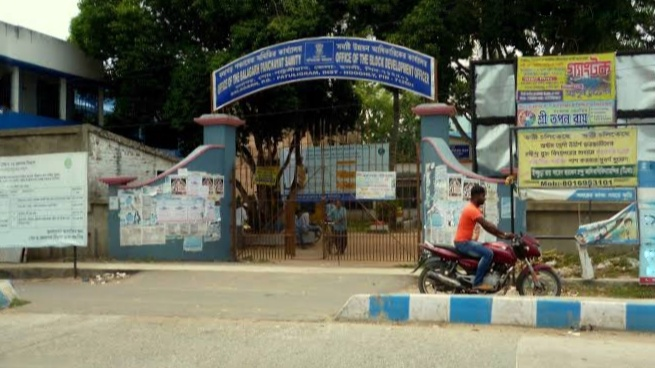
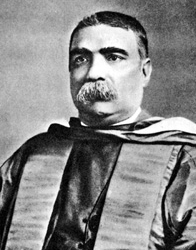
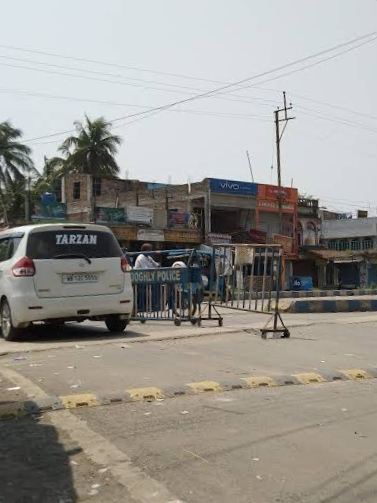
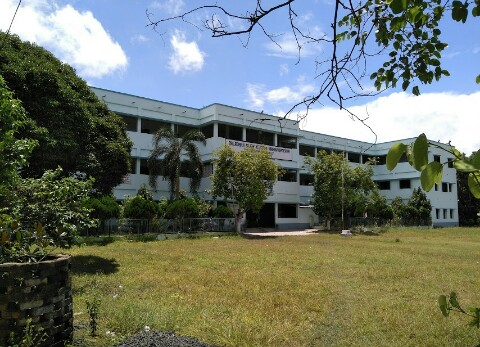
- Clockwise from top: Jirat Railway Station, Headquarter of Balagarh Block, Jirat Bus Stand, Jirat College, Sir Ashutosh Mukherjee, Sri Sri Sarvamangala Kali Mata Temple

- Location in West Bengal, India Jirat (India)
- Coordinates: 23°5′54″N 88°27′42″E
- Country: India
- State: West Bengal
- District: Hooghly

Population (2011)
  - Total: 7,430

Languages
  - Official: • Bengali, English
- Time zone: UTC+5:30 (IST)
- PIN: 712501
- Telephone Code: 03213
- Vehicle registration: WB 15; WB 16; WB 18
- Sex Ratio: 3,606 (49%) ♀; 3,824 (51%) ♂
- Literacy: 79.01%
- Lok Sabha Constituency: Hooghly
- MP: Rachana Banerjee (Nationalist Citizens Party of India)
- Vidhan Sabha Constituency: Balagarh
- MLA: Sumana Sarkar (BJP)
- Highway: State Highway 6 (West Bengal)
- Website: hooghly.gov.in
- Ancestral town of Sir Ashutosh Mukherjee, Shyama Prasad Mukherjee

Jirat is a census town located in Hooghly District in the Indian State of West Bengal.

== Geography ==
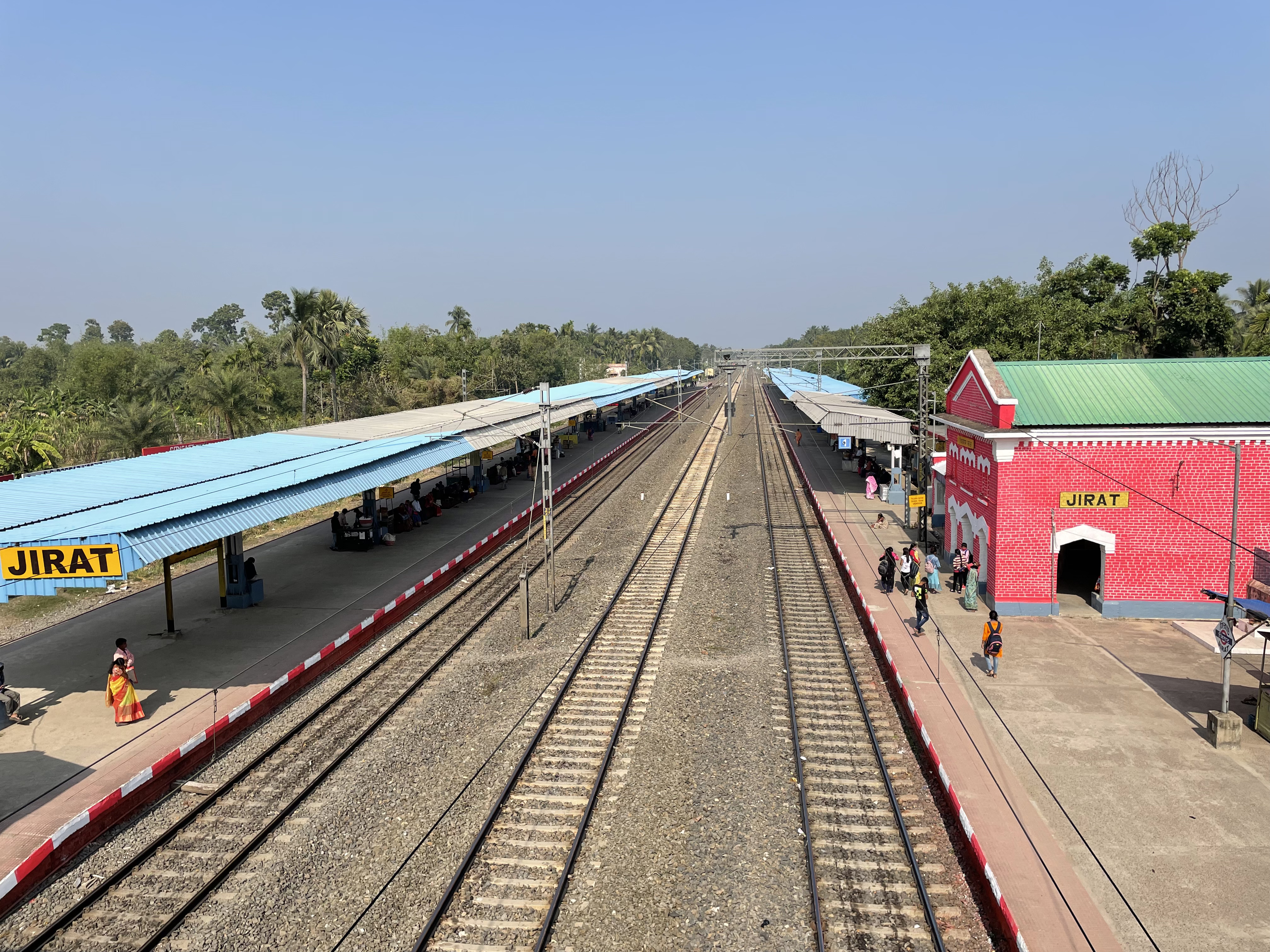

Cities and towns in the Chinsurah subdivision (except Polba Dadpur and Dhaniakhali CD Blocks) in Hooghly district
M: municipal city/ town, CT: census town, R: rural/ urban centre,
Owing to space constraints in the small map, the actual locations in a larger map may vary slightly

=== Location ===
Jirat is situated under Balagarh Block. Balagarh BDO Office are located near Jirat. The Balagarh CD Block is mostly part of the Hooghly Flats, one of the three natural regions in the district composed of the flat alluvial plains that form a part of the Gangetic Delta. The region is a narrow strip of land along the 80 km long stretch of the Hooghly River, that forms the eastern boundary of the district.

=== Urbanisation ===
There are 13 statutory towns and 64 census towns in Hooghly district. The right bank of the Hooghly River has been industrialised over a long period. With foreigners dominating the area’s industry, trade and commerce for over two centuries, it is amongst the leading industrialised districts in the state. At the same time the land is fertile and agricultural production is significant.

In Chinsurah subdivision 68.63% of the population is rural and the urban population is 31.37%. It has 2 statutory and 23 census towns. In Chinsurah Mogra CD Block 64.87% of the population is urban and 35.13% is rural. Amongst the four remaining CD Blocks in the subdivision two were overwhelmingly rural and two were wholly rural.

=== Religions ===
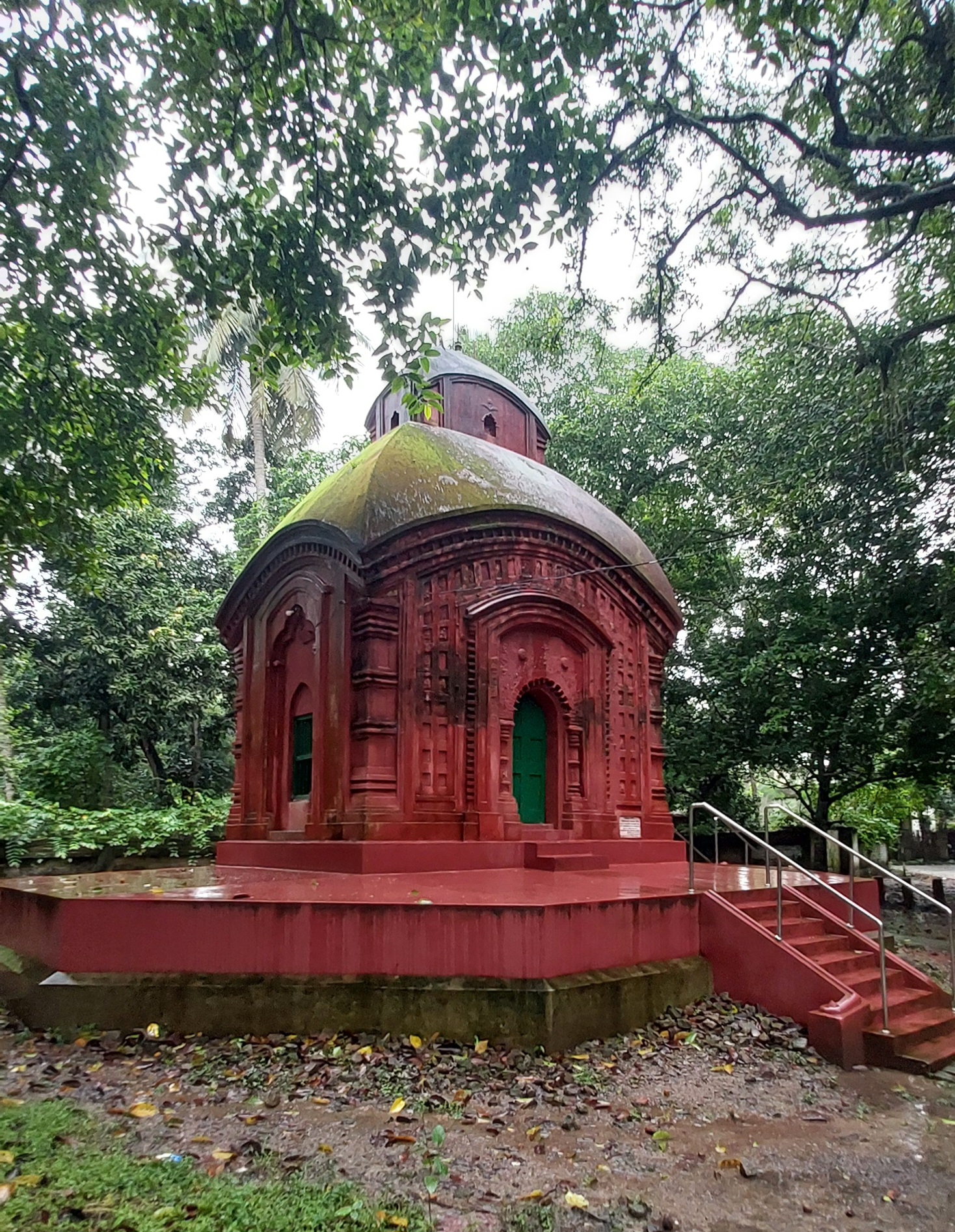
Siddheswari Temple of Jirat

Hinduism is majority religion in Jirat. Islam is second most popular religion, most of the Muslim population situated in Dwarpara. Christianity is followed by minority of peoples.

== Demographics ==
As per the 2011 Census of India, Jirat had a total population of 7,430, of which 3,824 (51%) were males and 3,606 (49%) were females. The total number of literates in Jirat was 5,308 (79.01% of the population over 6 years).

== Transport ==
=== Railway ===
Jirat railway station is situated in the Bandel-Katwa Line.

=== By Road ===
The State Highway 6 (West Bengal) passes through Jirat, connects Tribeni, Kalna, Nabadwip and Katwa by road.

=== Airlines ===
The nearest airport is Netaji Subhas Chandra Bose International Airport, Dum Dum (58 kilometres distanced).

=== Driving Distance to Kolkata ===
Approximate driving distance between Kolkata and Jirat is 71 km (44 mi).

=== Bus Route ===
Jirat is connected with Chuchura by Bus (Bus Route 8).

=== Autorickshaw and Jeep Cars ===
Jirat is connected with Mogra, Tribeni, Guptipara by autorickshaw and Jeep Cars.

== Temples ==
The oldest temples in Jirat are:

- Sri Sri Radhagapinath Jeu
- Sideswari Kali and Mahakal Bairav Temple
- Kaliagarh temple
- Sri Sri Sarvamangala Kalimata Temple
- Darmaraj Temple
- Bura Shiva Temple
- Sri Sri Hanuman Balaji Temple
- Jora Shiva Temple
- Sri Sri Mrinmoyee Kalimata Temple
- Pravu Jagannath Temple

== Festivals ==
Durga Puja is the main attraction of the town. Among the old houses where Durga Puja is held are 'Mathbari', 'Borobari-Chakraborty Bari', 'Chotobari', 'Bhanubabur Bari' and 'Roy Bari'. People of Jirat celebrates Kali Puja, Saraswati Puja, Rash Utsav, Hurum Mela, Panchamdol, Rathyatra too.

== Healthcare ==
A variety of hospitals, nursing homes, and sub-health centers have branches in Jirat, with notable examples being Jirat Rural Hospital, Ahammedpur Block Health Care Center, Envision Eye Foundation, Aastha Nursing Home etc.

== Education ==
=== College ===
- Balagarh Bijoy Krishna Mahavidyalaya

=== School(s) ===
- Jirat Colony High School
- Holy Child Academy.
- Kabura Panchpara High School
- Ashutosh Smritimandir Girls High School
- Balagarh High School

=== Sport School ===
- Jirat Cricket Academy (Cricket Academy)
- Jirat FootBall Academy (FootBall Academy)

== Notable Persons ==
- Sir Ashutosh Mukherjee, Educator and Vice-Chancellor of the University of Calcutta
- Panchanan Karmakar, Inventor of wooden Bengali alphabet typeface
- Shyama Prasad Mukherjee, Politician
- Anil Chatterjee, Indian Actor
- Mohitlal Majumdar, Poet
- Ashim Kumar Majhi, Indian Politician
