= Balagarh Bijoy Krishna Mahavidyalaya =

College in Jirat, West Bengal, India

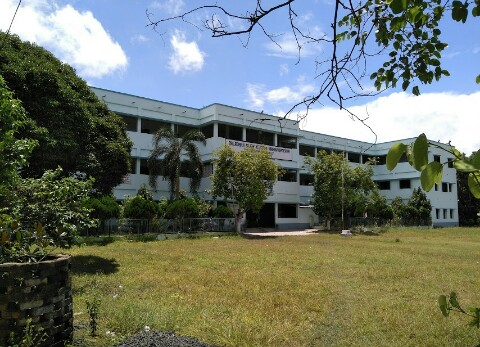
- Main building of Jirat College
- Other name: Jirat College
- Type: Undergraduate college Public college
- Established: 1985; 41 years ago
- Founder: Bijoy Krishna Modak
- Academic affiliations: University of Burdwan
- Principal: Dr. Pratap Banerjee
- Students: 2000
- Undergraduates: B.A.; B.Sc.; B.Com.
- Location: Jirat, West Bengal, 712501, India; 23.0936473°N 88.4571126°E
- Campus: Urban
- Colors: Sky Blue
- Website: Balagarh Bijoy Krishna Mahavidyalaya

- Location within West Bengal Location within India

Balagarh Bijoy Krishna Mahavidyalaya commonly known as Jirat College, is the general degree college located at Balagarh in Hooghly district. The college was established in 1985 by Sri Bijoy Krishna Modak, a Political and Social Worker. The college offers undergraduate courses in Arts, Commerce, and Science. The campus is in the Hooghly District. It is affiliated to the University of Burdwan.

== Departments ==
=== Science ===
- Physics
- Mathematics
- Computer Science ( Only General Stream)

=== Arts and Commerce ===
- Bengali
- English
- History
- Geography
- Political Science
- Philosophy
- Commerce

== Accreditation ==
In 2016, Balagarh Bijoy Krishna Mahavidyalaya has been awarded C grade by the National Assessment and Accreditation Council (NAAC). The college is also recognized by the University Grants Commission (UGC).

== See also ==
- List of institutions of higher education in West Bengal
- Education in India
- Education in West Bengal
