= Balagarh railway station =

Railway station in West Bengal, India

Balagarh
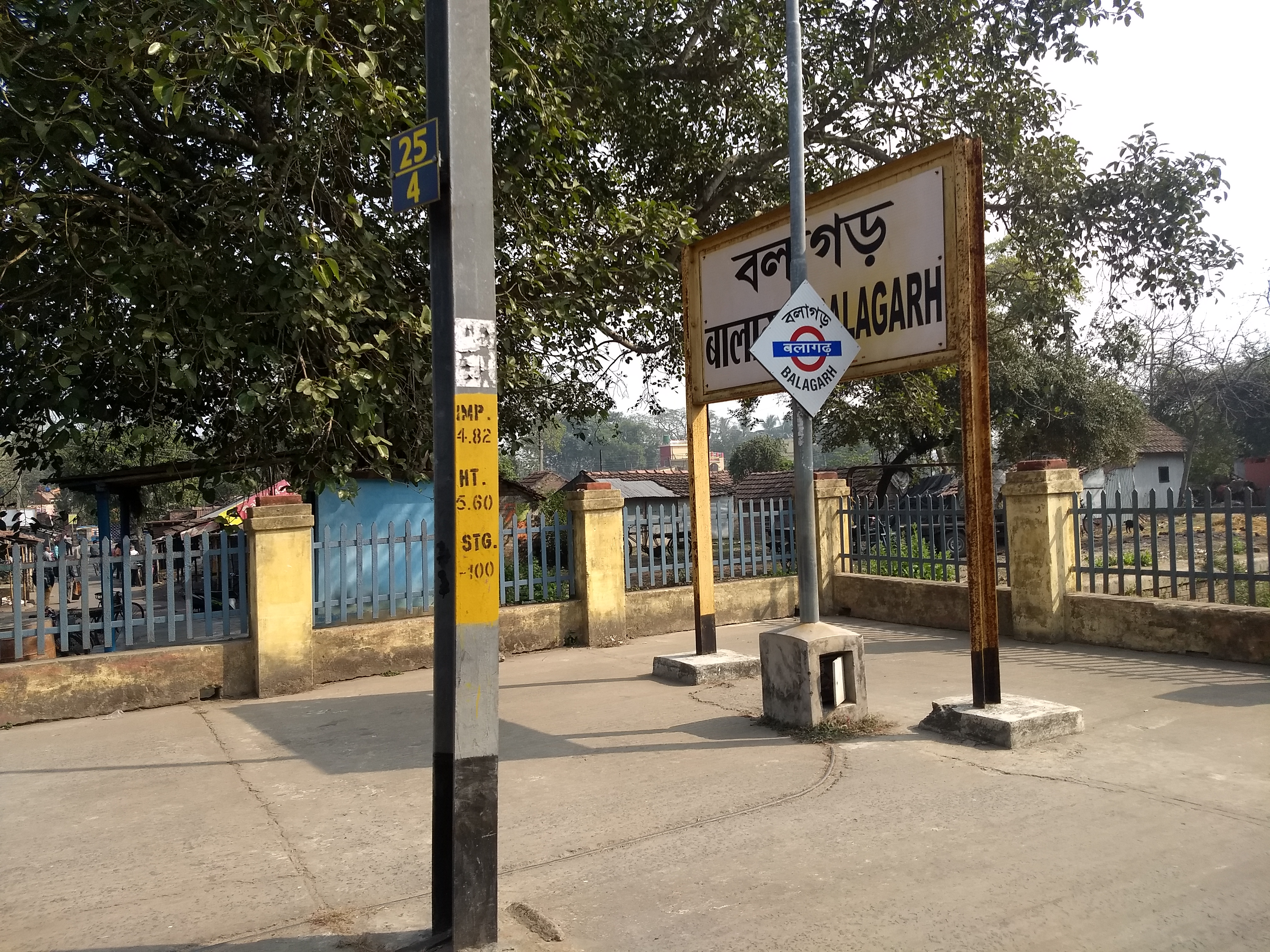
- Balagarh railway station

General information
- Location: South Chandra, Balagarh, Hooghly district, West Bengal; India
- Coordinates: 23.122107°N 88.452913°E
- Elevation: 13 m (43 ft)
- System: Kolkata Suburban Railway
- Owner: Indian Railways
- Operator: Eastern Railway
- Platforms: 2
- Tracks: 2

Construction
- Structure type: Standard (on ground station)
- Parking: No
- Cycle facilities: No

Other information
- Status: Functioning
- Station code: BGAE
- Zone(s): Eastern Railway
- Division(s): Howrah

Services
Preceding station	Kolkata Suburban Railway	Following station
Jirat towards Howrah Junction	Eastern Line Bandel–Katwa line	Somra Bazar towards Katwa Junction
Route map
Location
- Location within West Bengal Location within India

Balagarh railway station is a railway station on Bandel–Katwa line connecting from Bandel to Katwa, and under the jurisdiction of Howrah railway division of Eastern Railway zone. It is situated at South Chandra, Balagarh, Hooghly district in the Indian state of West Bengal. Number of EMU local and passenger trains stop at Balagarh railway station.

== History ==
The Hooghly–Katwa Railway constructed a line from Bandel to Katwa in 1913. This line including Balagarh railway station was electrified in 1994–96 with 25 kV overhead line.
