= Mulgram =

- Village
- Location in West Bengal, India Mulgram (India)
- Country: India
- State: West Bengal
- District: Hooghly
- Elevation: 20 m (66 ft)

Population (2011)
  - Total: 813

Languages
  - Official: Bengali, English
- Time zone: UTC+5:30 (IST)
- PIN: 712134
- Telephone code: 03213
- ISO 3166 code: IN-WB

Mulgram is a village in Hooghly district, West Bengal, India. The village is 20 meters above sea level. Its post office is in Boinchi, its police station is in Pandua. Its PIN code is 712134 and Bengali is the local language. The village is surrounded by the village named Bhonpur. Inchhura, etc. It's 4 km apart from region's main town Boinchi.

== Transport ==
Bainchigram railway station and Boinchi are the nearest railway stations to Mulgram, however the nearest major railway station is at Bardhaman, 40 km away.

== Festivals ==
Durga Puja, Lakshmi Puja, Sarswati Puja, Kali Puja is the main festivals here.

== Population ==
Mulgram village has a population of 813, of which 393 are males while 420 are females as per the 2011Population Census.

In Mulgram village population of children with age 0–6 is 80 which makes up 9.84% of total population of village. Average Sex Ratio of Mulgram village is 1069 which is higher than West Bengal state average of 950. Child Sex Ratio for the Mulgram as per census is 739, lower than West Bengal average of 956.

Mulgram village has higher literacy rate compared to West Bengal. In 2011, literacy rate of Mulgram village was 79.13% compared to 76.26% of West Bengal. In Mulgram Male literacy stands at 85.01% while female literacy rate was 73.83%.

=== Caste factor ===
Schedule Tribe (ST) constitutes 22.51% while Schedule Caste (SC) were 18.33% of total population in Mulgram village.

=== Work profile ===
In Mulgram village out of total population, 329 were engaged in work activities. 21.88% of workers describe their work as Main Work (Employment or Earning more than 6 Months) while 78.12% were involved in Marginal activity providing livelihood for less than 6 months. Of 329 workers engaged in Main Work, 42 were cultivators (owner or co-owner) while 1 were Agricultural labourer.
