= Piragram =

- Village
- Location in West Bengal, India Piragram (India)
- Coordinates: 23°08′35″N 88°13′25″E
- Country: India
- State: West Bengal
- District: Hooghly
- Elevation: 15 m (49 ft)

Population (2011)
  - Total: 1,223

Languages
  - Official: Bengali, English
- Time zone: UTC+5:30 (IST)
- PIN: 712134
- Telephone code: 03213
- ISO 3166 code: IN-WB

Piragram is a village in Hooghly district, West Bengal, India. The village is 15 meters abover sea-level. Its post office is in Roy-Jamna, its police station is in Pandua. Its pincode is 712134 and Bengali is the local language. The village is surrounded by the village named Roy-Jamna, Mulgram. Inchhura, etc.

== Transport ==
Bainchigram and Boinchi are the nearest railway stations to Bhonpur, however the nearest major railway station is at Bardhaman, 42 km away.

== Festivals ==
Durga Puja, Lakshmi Puja, Sarswati Puja, Hanuman Puja is the main festivals here.

== Population & Literacy ==
Piragram village has population of 1223 of which 619 are males while 604 are females as per Population Census 2011.

In Piragram village population of children with age 0-6 is 110 which makes up 8.99% of total population of village. Average Sex Ratio of Piragram village is 976 which is higher than West Bengal state average of 950. Child Sex Ratio for the Piragram as per census is 774, lower than West Bengal average of 956.

Piragram village has a lower literacy rate compared to West Bengal. In 2011, literacy rate of Piragram village was 66.94% compared to 76.26% of West Bengal. Male literacy stood at 73.79% while female literacy rate was 60.07%.

=== Work Profile ===
In Piragram village 656 of the total population were engaged in work activities. 45.12% of workers describe their work as Main Work (Employment or Earning more than 6 Months) while 54.88% were involved in Marginal activity providing livelihood for less than 6 months. Of 656 workers engaged in Main Work, 44 were cultivators (owner or co-owner) while 218 were Agricultural labourer.

=== Caste Factor ===
In Piragram village, most of the village population is from Schedule Tribe (ST). Schedule Tribe (ST) constitutes 45.13% while Schedule Caste (SC) were 24.37% of total population in Piragram village.
