= Inchhura =

- Village
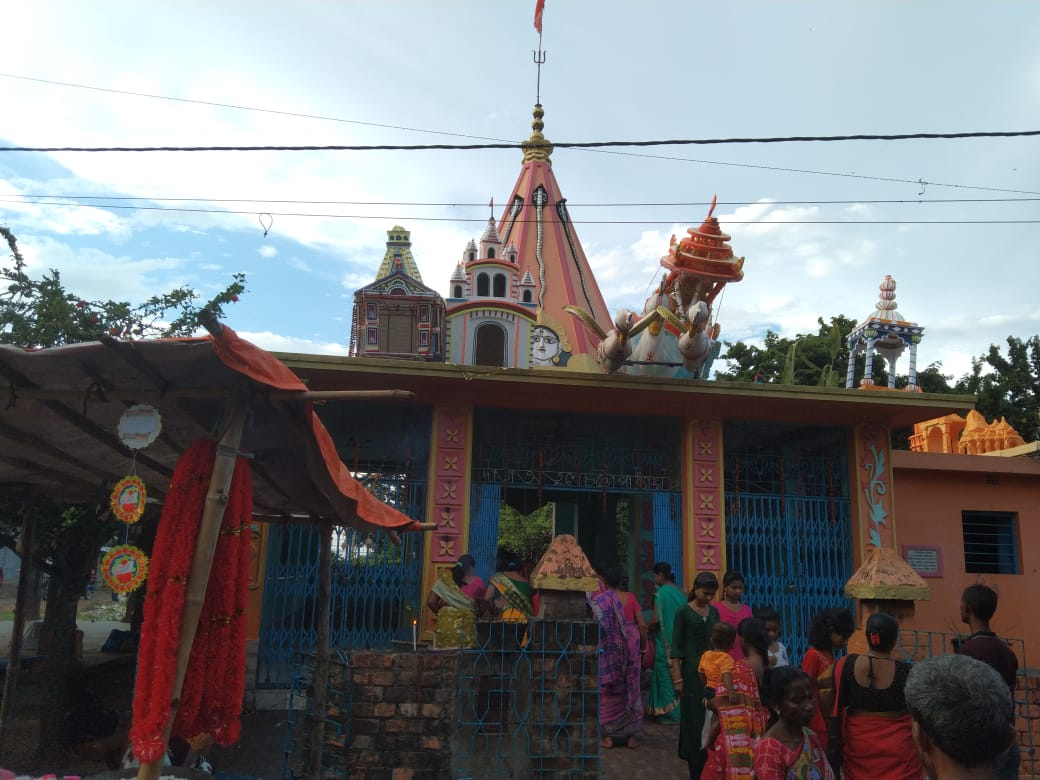
- Maa Bishohori Mandir, Inchhura

- Location in West Bengal, India Inchhura (India)
- Coordinates: 23.1190011°N 88.1949722°E
- Country: India
- State: West Bengal
- District: Hooghly
- Elevation: 20 m (66 ft)

Population (2011)
  - Total: 1,421

Languages
  - Official: Bengali, English
- Time zone: UTC+5:30 (IST)
- PIN: 712134
- Telephone code: 03213
- ISO 3166 code: IN-WB

Inchhura (or Insura) is a village in Hooghly district in the Indian state of West Bengal.

== Geography ==
The village is 20 meters above sea level. Its post office is in Boinchi. The police station is in Pandua. Its PIN code is 712134 and Bengali is the local language. The village is located in Pandua of Hooghly district, West Bengal, surrounded by the villages of Mulgram, Bhonpur, and Piragram, and is approximately 4.5 km from the region's main town, Boinchi.

== Transport ==
Bainchigram and Boinchi are the nearest railway stations to Bhonpur, however the nearest major railway station is at Bardhaman, 41 km away.

== Festivals ==
Durga Puja, Lakshmi Puja, Sarswati Puja, and Kali Puja are the main festivals here.

== Demography ==
Inchhura is a medium-sized village with a total of 310 families. The population at the 2011 India census was 1367, 677 are males and 690 females. Children aged 0-6 numbered 149, 10.9% of the total population. The average sex ratio was 1019, higher than the West Bengal state average of 950. The child sex ratio was 1292, higher than the West Bengal average of 956.

Inchhura has a higher literacy rate than West Bengal as a whole: in 2011, 82.76% compared to 76.26% for West Bengal. Male literacy was 89.87% and female literacy 75.58%.

=== Caste factor ===
Inchhura has a substantial population of scheduled castes, 33.87%, and scheduled tribes, 17.56%.

=== Work profile ===
Inchhura is a farming village. In 2011 out of the total population, 642 were engaged in work activities. 38.79% of the workers described their work as main work (employment or earning more than 6 months of the year), 61.21% as marginal activity providing a livelihood for less than 6 months. Of 642 workers engaged in main work, 54 were cultivators (owner or co-owner) while 60 were agricultural laborers.
