= Roy-Jamna =

- Village
- Location in West Bengal, India Roy-Jamna (India)
- Coordinates: 23°09′10″N 88°13′40″E
- Country: India
- State: West Bengal
- District: Hooghly
- Elevation: 13 m (43 ft)

Population (2011)
  - Total: 1,433

Languages
  - Official: Bengali, English
- Time zone: UTC+5:30 (IST)
- PIN: 712134
- Telephone code: 03213
- ISO 3166 code: IN-WB

Roy-Jamna (often called Jamna) is a village in Hooghly district, West Bengal, India. The village is 13 meters over sea-level. Its post office is in Roy-Jamna, its police station is in Pandua. Its pincode is 712134 and Bengali is the local language. The village is surrounded by villages named Piragram, Gahami, Baidyapur, etc. This village is about 5 km apart from region's main town Boinchi.

== Transport ==
Bainchigram and Boinchi are the nearest railway stations to Roy-Jamna; however, the nearest major railway station is at Bardhaman, 43 km away.

== Festivals ==
Durga Puja, Lakshmi Puja, Sarswati Puja is the main festivals here.‍

== Economy ==
Most of the villagers are cultivators.

== Population ==
Jamna is a medium size village with total 354 families residing. The Jamna village has population of 1433 of which 717 are males while 716 are females as per Population Census 2011.

In Jamna village population of children with age 0-6 is 123 which makes up 8.58% of total population of village. Average Sex Ratio of Jamna village is 999 which is higher than West Bengal state average of 950. Child Sex Ratio for the Jamna as per census is 836, lower than West Bengal average of 956.

Jamna village has higher literacy rate compared to West Bengal. In 2011, literacy rate of Jamna village was 87.63% compared to 76.26% of West Bengal. In Jamna Male literacy stands at 92.62% while female literacy rate was 82.73%.

=== Caste Factor ===
Jamna village of Hugli has substantial population of Schedule Caste. Schedule Caste (SC) constitutes 26.24% while Schedule Tribe (ST) were 17.79% of total population in Jamna village.

=== Work Profile ===
In Jamna village out of total population, 543 were engaged in work activities. 37.02% of workers describe their work as Main Work (Employment or Earning more than 6 Months) while 62.98% were involved in Marginal activity providing livelihood for less than 6 months. Of 543 workers engaged in Main Work, 43 were cultivators (owner or co-owner) while 80 were Agricultural labourer.

== River ==
The river blows beside it named Gangur.
