= Manasamangal Kāvya =

Bengali Hindu religious text

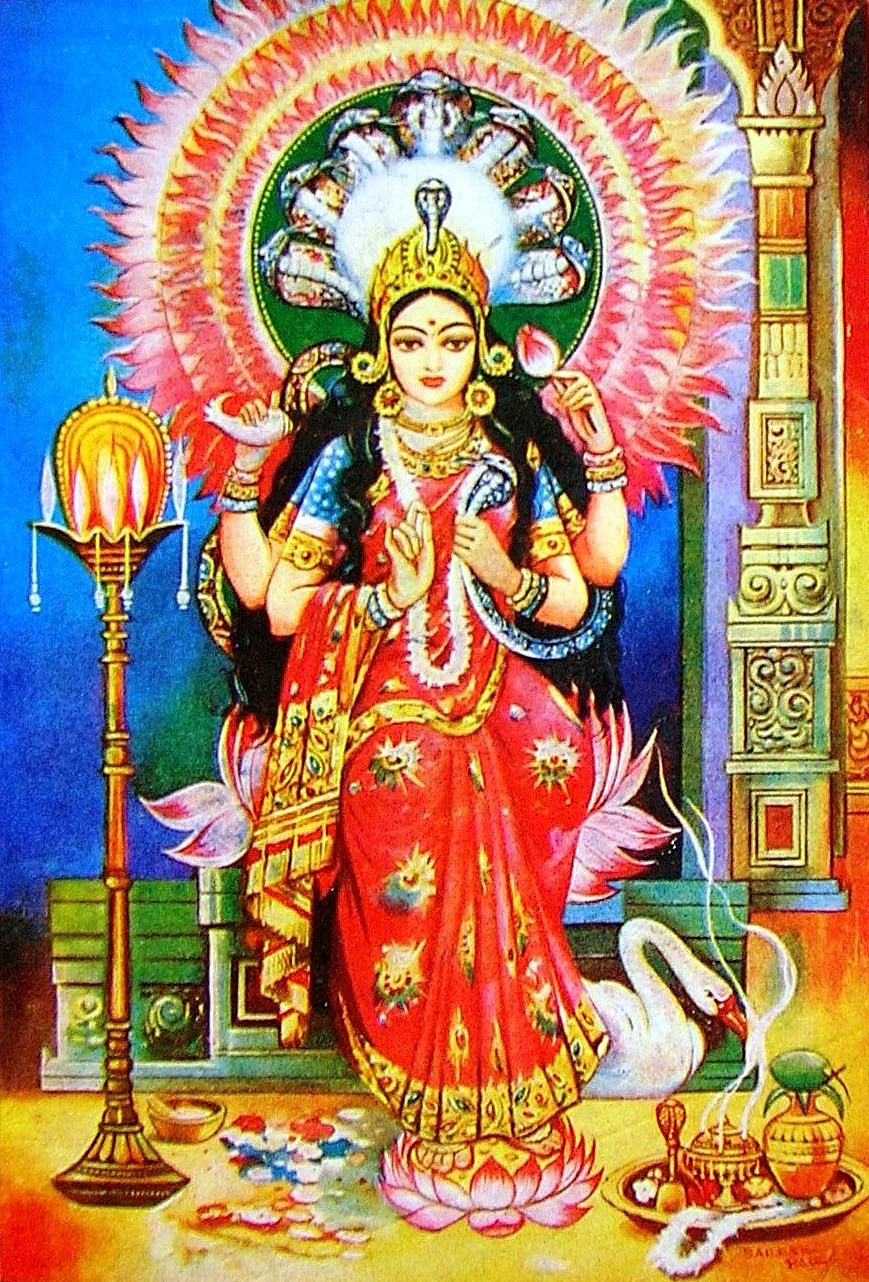
Depiction of Manasā, the snake-goddess in 20th century Bengali popular art.

Manasamangal Kāvya (Bengali: মনসামঙ্গল কাব্য) is recognized as the oldest of the Bengali Mangal-Kāvyas, chronicling the establishment of the snake-goddess Manasa's worship in Bengal. The goddess holds alternative names such as Bisahari, Janguli, and Padmavati.In the Kāvya, she is also derogatorily referred to as "Chyang-muri Kaani"(The One-Eyed Wretch") by Chand Sadagar.

== Story ==
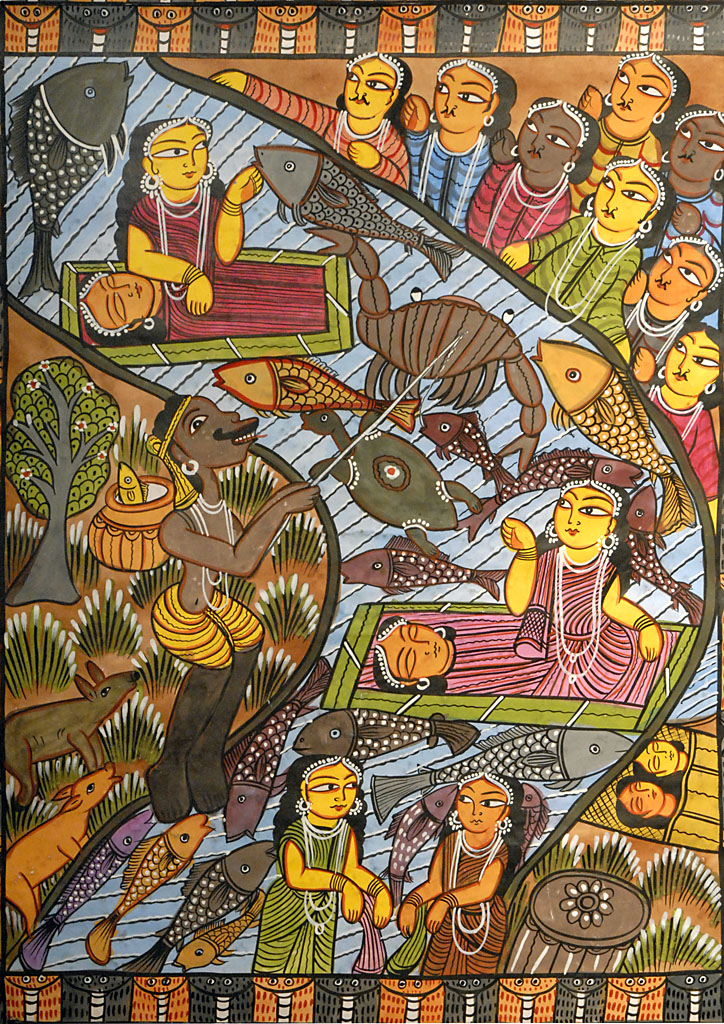
Behula sails with her deceased husband, scene from Manasa Mangal

The narrative of Manasamangal commences with the merchant Chandradhar, or Chand Sadagar, who initially conflicts with Manasa but eventually becomes a devout worshipper. Manasa aspires to convert Chand, a staunch devotee of Shiva, to her worship. However, he not only refuses to worship her but also denies her deity status. In retaliation, Manasa ruins seven of Chand's ships and takes the lives of his sons. Behula, the new bride of Chand’s youngest son, Lakhindar, challenges the goddess with her unwavering courage and deep love for her husband, subsequently reviving Chand’s sons and their ships. Only after accomplishing this does Behula return home. The tale essentially portrays human resilience against divine cruelty, showcasing Chandradhar and Behula as robust, determined individuals during an era when common people were often suppressed and humiliated.

== Villages Named After the Kavya ==
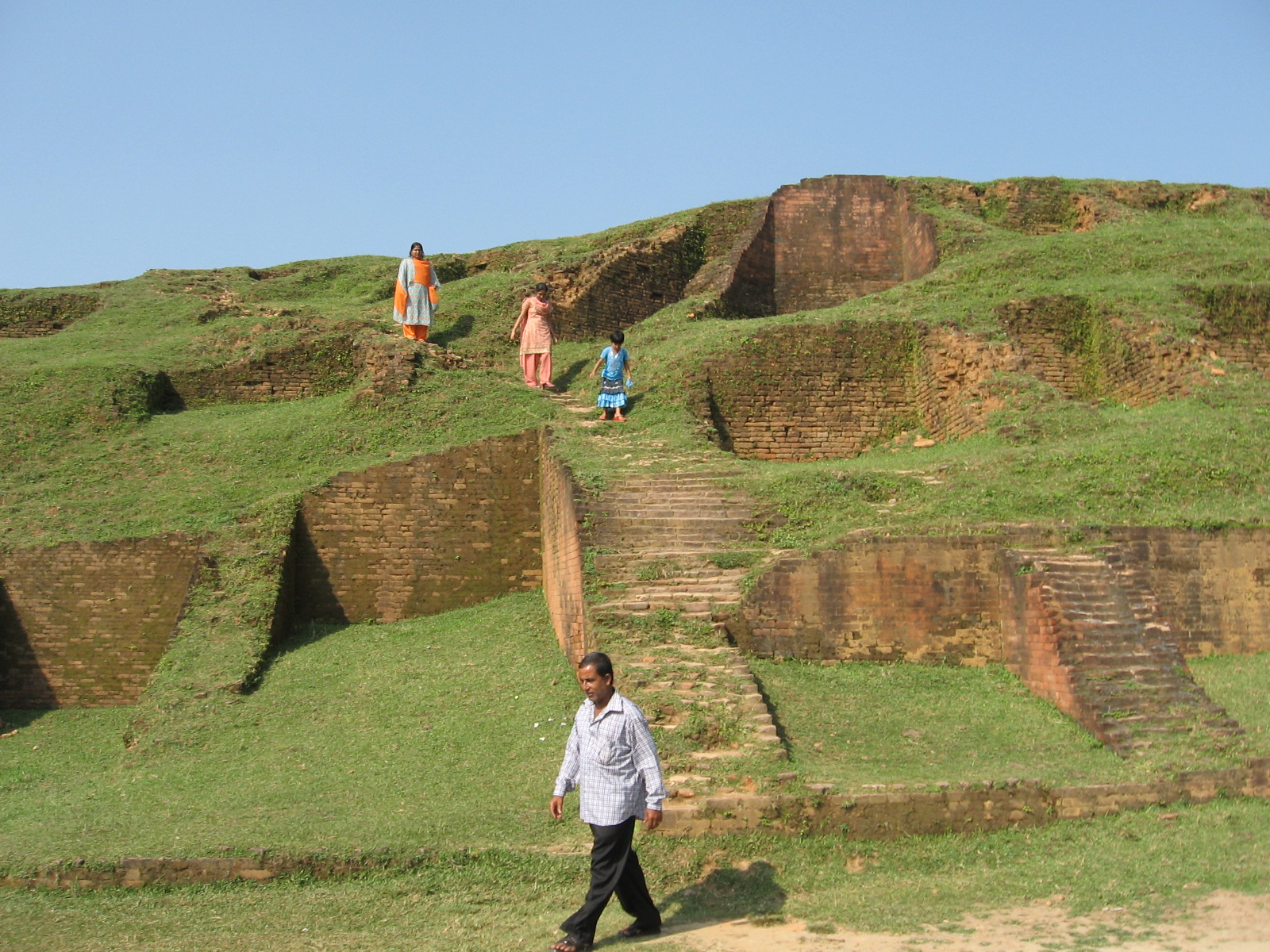
Ruins, believed to be Lakshmindara-Behula’s bridal chamber, at Gokul Medh, near Bogra in Bangladesh

Villages such as Baidyapur, Hasanhati, and Udaypur owe their names to the Kavya.

Village Name	Naming Origin
Baidyapur	Named because local 'Baidyas' (doctors) attempted and failed to revive Lakhindar as Behula transported him through the village.
Hasanhati	The village where people laughed at Behula during her journey.
Udaypur	Named for the place where the sun rose during Behula’s voyage.

== Poets of Manasamangal Kavya ==
The original poet of this medieval Bengali literature genre may have been Kana Haridatta (c. 13th century), but his works are no longer extant. His name is referenced in the works of both Bijay Gupta and Purushottam. Subsequent poets, including Purushottam, Narayan Deb (c. 15th century), Bijay Gupta, and Bipradas Pipilai, created their own versions of Manasamangal. Bijay Gupta's Manasamangal (or Padmapuran) (1484–85) is renowned for its rich literary quality and is perhaps the most popular version. Bipradas Pipilai's Manasabijay (1495–96) was also composed during this period. Narayan Deb's composition is also known as Padmapuran. Jagmohan Mitra of Gopalpur( c. 18th century) composed an elaborate hieratic version of Maa Manasakabya after receiving visions in his dream of Maa Manasa compelling him to do so.

Ketakadas Kshemananda (c. 17th century), Jagajjiban Ghoshal (c. 17th century) and Jibankrishna Maitra (c. 18th century) were also contributors to this genre.

== See also ==
- Mangal-Kāvya
- Chaitanya Bhagavata
- Tulsidas
- Bhakti
- Bengali literature
- Gokul Medh - claimed links to Manasamangal Kavya
- Kasba - claiming to be the site of Champaknagari
