= Vivekananda Pally =

Ward in West Bengal, India

- Colony/Ward
- Location in West Bengal, India
- Coordinates: 23.1209035°N 88.2012919°E
- Country: India
- State: West Bengal
- District: Hooghly
- Elevation: 21 m (69 ft)

Languages
  - Official: Bengali
- Time zone: UTC+5:30 (IST)
- PIN: 712134
- Telephone code: 03213

Vivekananda Pally is a Ward of Boinchi that is located in North-west of this town.

== Education ==
This colony has a primary school named Batika Battala Primary School.

== Surroundings ==
The colony is a part of Boinchi. In north, there is Momrejpur and Tailokopa is in the west.

== Festivals ==
The main festival of this colony is Durga Puja. It is started in 2005.

Durga Puja

== Transport ==
Bainchi railway station is the nearest rail station of Vivekananda Pally. It is 1 km from the colony. Boinchi-Kalna Road passes thorough the east of the colony.
