= Boragori =

- Village
- Location in West Bengal, India Boragori (India)
- Coordinates: 23.130825°N 88.162971°E
- Country: India
- State: West Bengal
- District: Hooghly
- Elevation: 20.5 m (67 ft)

Population (2011)
  - Total: 1,548

Languages
  - Official: Bengali, English
  - Other Language: Santali
- Time zone: UTC+5:30 (IST)
- PIN: 712134
- Lok Sabha constituency: Hooghly
- Vidhan Sabha constituency: Pandua
- Website: https://sites.google.com/site/boragoriwestbengalindia/

Boragori is a village of Hooghly District under Pandua police station and Berela-Kochmali Gram Panchayet in West Bengal. Boragori is the only village in this area that has 100% Hindu population.

== Geography ==
Boragori is located in West Bengal. It has an average elevation of 20.5 meters. This village surrounded by some villages, Panpara, Gokuldanga to the north, Berela, Abodpara, Moglompur to the south, Kochmali to the east, Debipur and Burdwan District to the west. By road Boragori is connected by G.T Road SH 13 (formerly NH 2B). Boragori is the last village of Hooghly District to the north, border of Burdwan District. The nearest rail station is Debipur, Memari I. Boinchi is the nearest major town that is connected with Boragori by GT Road.

== Demographics ==
- Boragori has an average literacy rate of 70.80%.
- 100% Hindu population

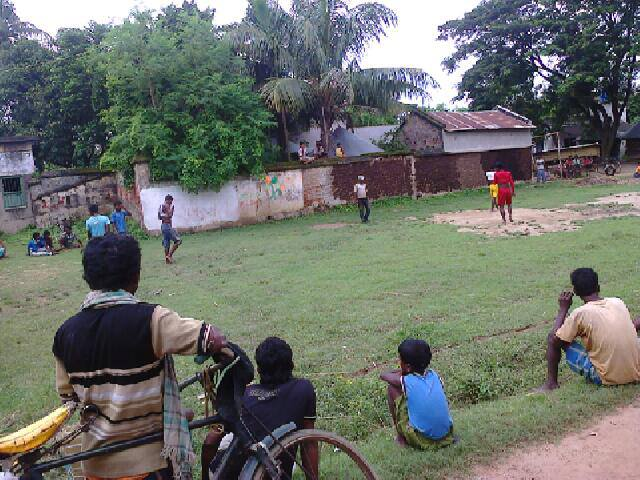
A foolball match is going to be started at Roypara ground.Football is famous at Boragori

== Facilities and rducation ==
This village has one primary school "Boragori S.N Primary School" one health center. and two Cold Storage.

== Temples and deity ==
Maa Kali Mata or Maa Manasha mandir is situated in this village. Baba Gopikanta, the main deity of Roy family of this village is a statue around 800 years old. There are 3 old terracotta temples situated.

== Economy ==
This village is covered by pure agricultural lands. In this village there are two Cold Storages, one milk factory, a cotton factory, and many different types of small industries. Kochmali-Boragori Krishi Unnayan Samabay Samity Ltd. is a co-operative bank of this village. Economically healthy. This co-operative is dealer of Hindustan Petroleum, IFFCO.
