= Simlagarh railway station =

Railway station in West Bengal, India

Simlagarh
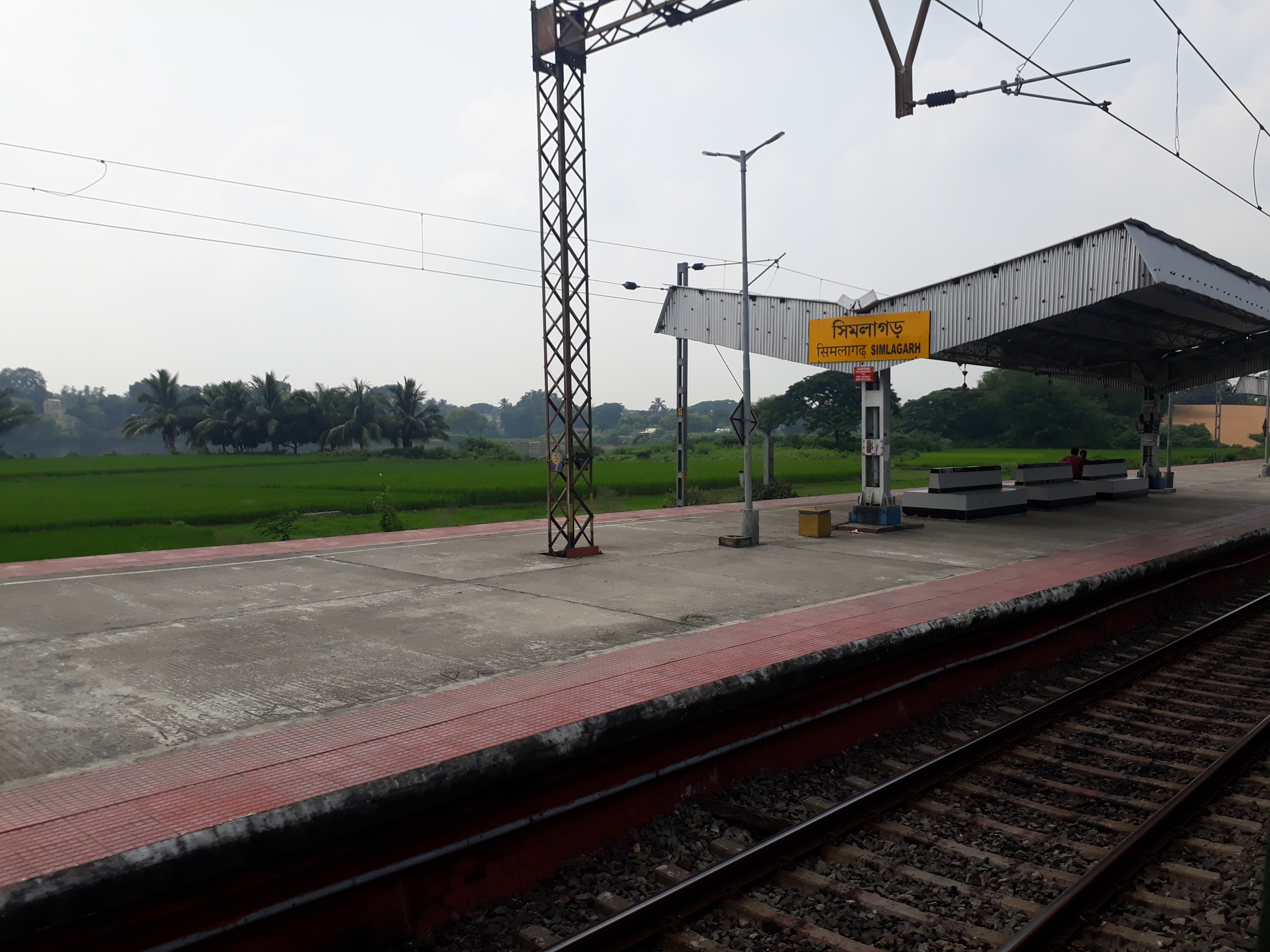

General information
- Location: Talbona Colony Road, National Highway 2, Simlagarh, Hooghly district, West Bengal; India
- Coordinates: 23°05′46″N 88°13′54″E
- Elevation: 20 metres (66 ft)
- System: Kolkata Suburban Railway
- Owner: Indian Railways
- Operator: Eastern Railway
- Line: Howrah–Bardhaman main line
- Platforms: 3
- Tracks: 2

Construction
- Structure type: Standard (on ground station)
- Parking: No

Other information
- Status: Functioning
- Station code: SLG
- Division(s): Howrah

History
- Opened: 1855
- Electrified: 1958
- Former names: East Indian Railway Company

Services
Preceding station	Kolkata Suburban Railway	Following station
Pundooah towards Howrah Junction	Eastern Line Howrah–Bardhaman main line	Bainchigram towards Barddhaman Junction
Route map
Location
- Location within West Bengal Location within India

Simlagarh railway station is a Kolkata Suburban Railway station on the Howrah–Bardhaman main line operated by Eastern Railway zone of Indian Railways. It is situated beside Talbona Colony Road, National Highway 2 at Simlagarh in Hooghly district in the Indian state of West Bengal. The distance between Howrah and Simlagarh railway station is approximately 65 km.

== History ==
The East Indian Railway Company was formed on 1 June 1845, The first passenger train in the eastern section was operated up to Hooghly, on 15 August 1854. On 1 February 1855 the first train ran from Howrah to Raniganj through Howrah–Bardhaman main line. Bandel to Bardhaman rout was opened for traffic on 1 January 1885. Electrification of the Howrah–Bardhaman main line was initiated up to Bandel in 1957, with the 3000 v DC system, and the entire Howrah–Bardhaman route including Simlagarh railway station completed with AC system, along with conversion of earlier DC portions to 25 kV AC, in 1958.
