= Baidyapur Jora Deul =

Two temples in Baidyapur

- An ASI Listed Monument
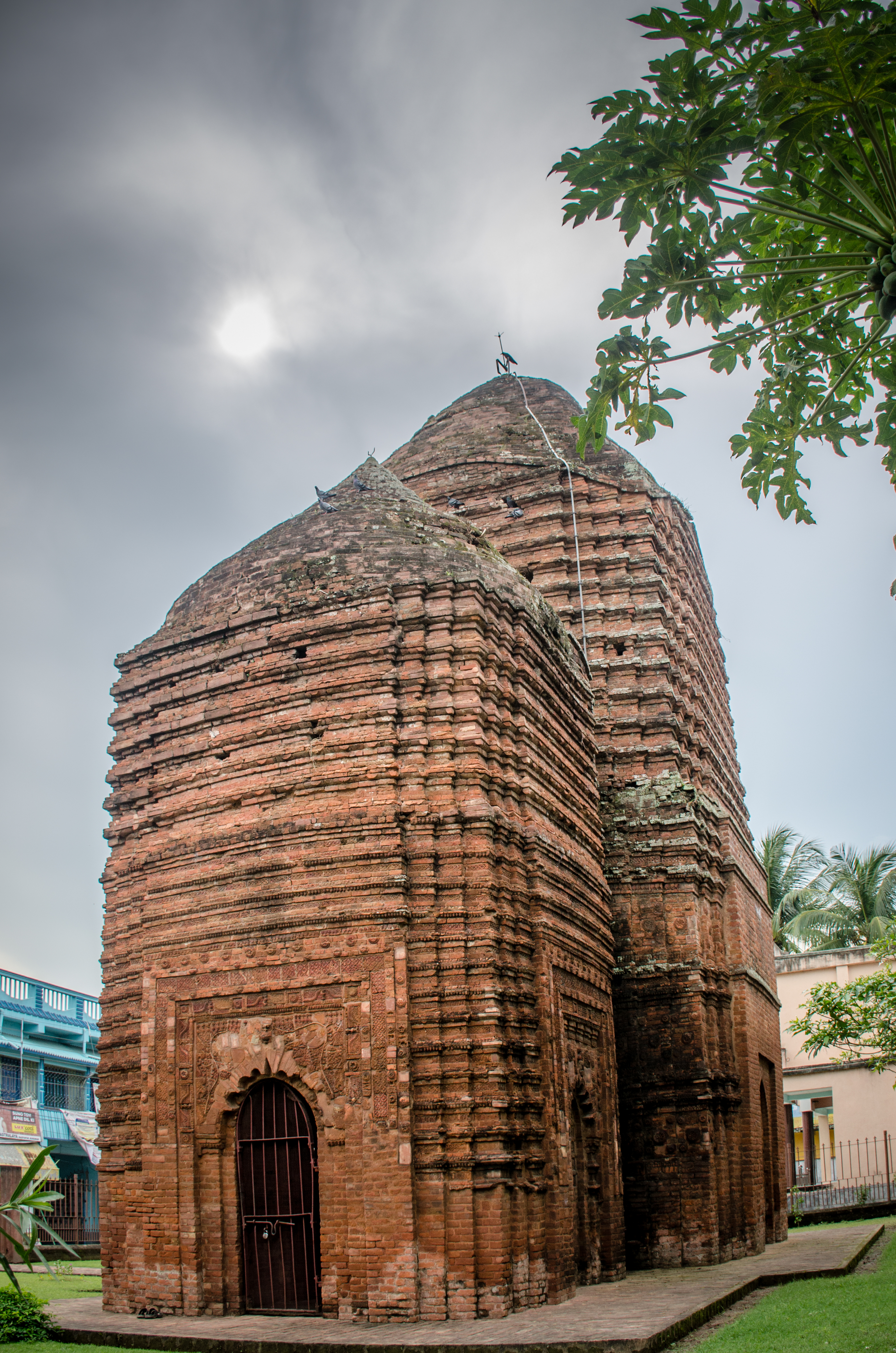

- Location within West Bengal Location within India

Religion
- Affiliation: Hinduism
- Deity: Shiva Lingam

Location
- Location: Baidyapur; Purba Bardhaman
- State: West Bengal
- Country: India
- Interactive map of Baidyapur Jora Deul
- Coordinates: 23.1601°N 88.2471°E

Architecture
- Type: Rekha deul
- Completed: 1550

Baidyapur Jora Deul is a 16th-century temple at Baidyapur in the Kalna II CD block in the Kalna subdivision of the Purba Bardhaman district in the Indian state of West Bengal.

== Location ==
Cities and towns in the Kalna subdivision of Purba Bardhaman district
M: municipal city/ town, CT: census town, R: rural/ urban centre, H: Historical/ religious centre, C: craft centre.
Owing to space constraints in the small map, the actual locations in a larger map may vary slightly

Baidyapur is on the Boinchi-Kalna Road and the nearest railway station is Bainchigram railway station on the Howrah-Bardhaman main line.

== History ==
Baidyapur Jora Deul was built in 1550 by Subhananda Pal. The two brick-built temples, with square bases probably had domed top in their original shape. Their facades are of carved bricks. The main temple faces east and the small north and they are interconnected with a passage and is datable to c.1550 A.D. The larger temple has an inscription over its domway.

According to the List of Monuments of National Importance in West Bengal the two ancient temples (joined together) at Baidyapur is an ASI listed monument.

== Jora Deul picture gallery ==
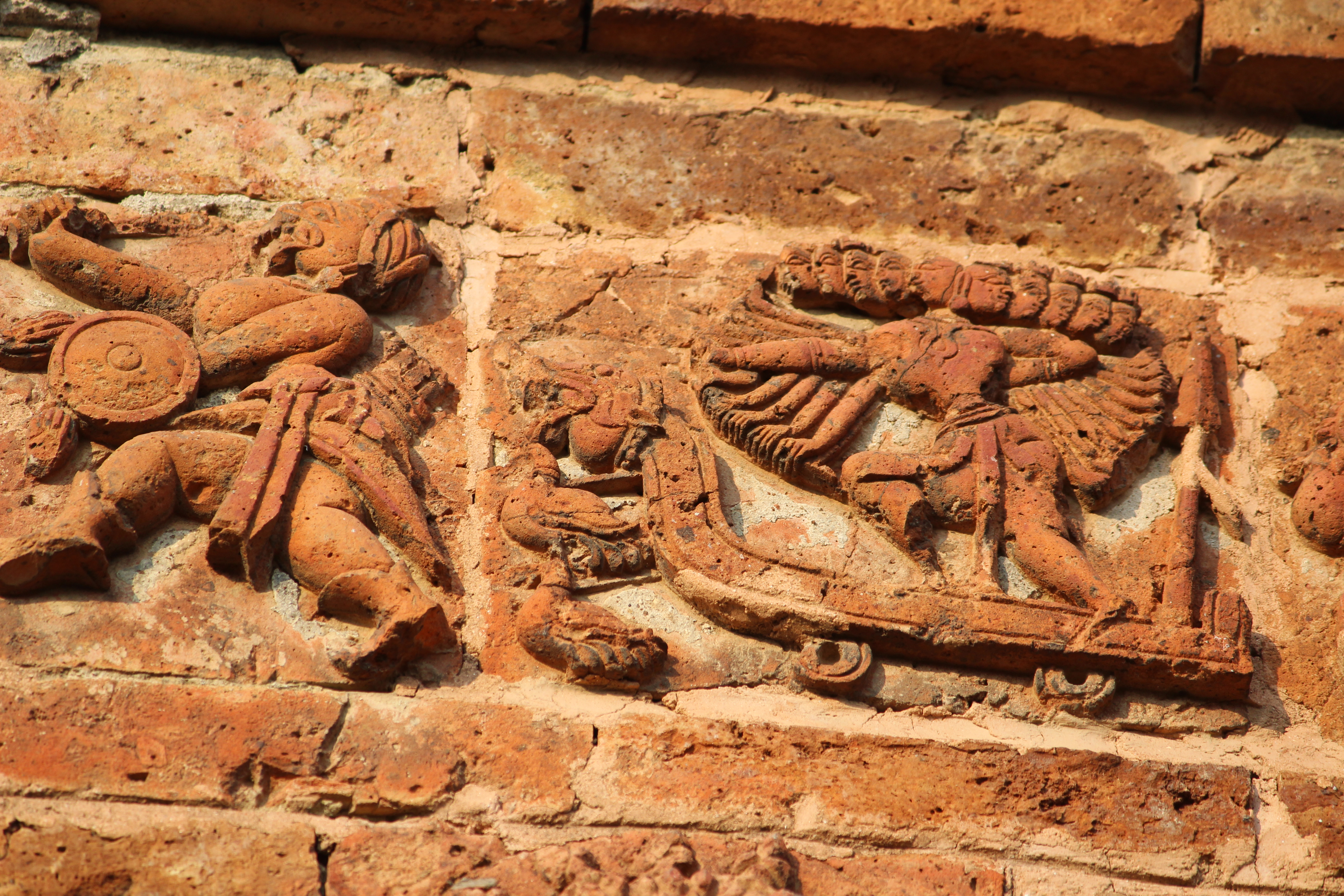
Terracotta decoration on Jora Deul wall

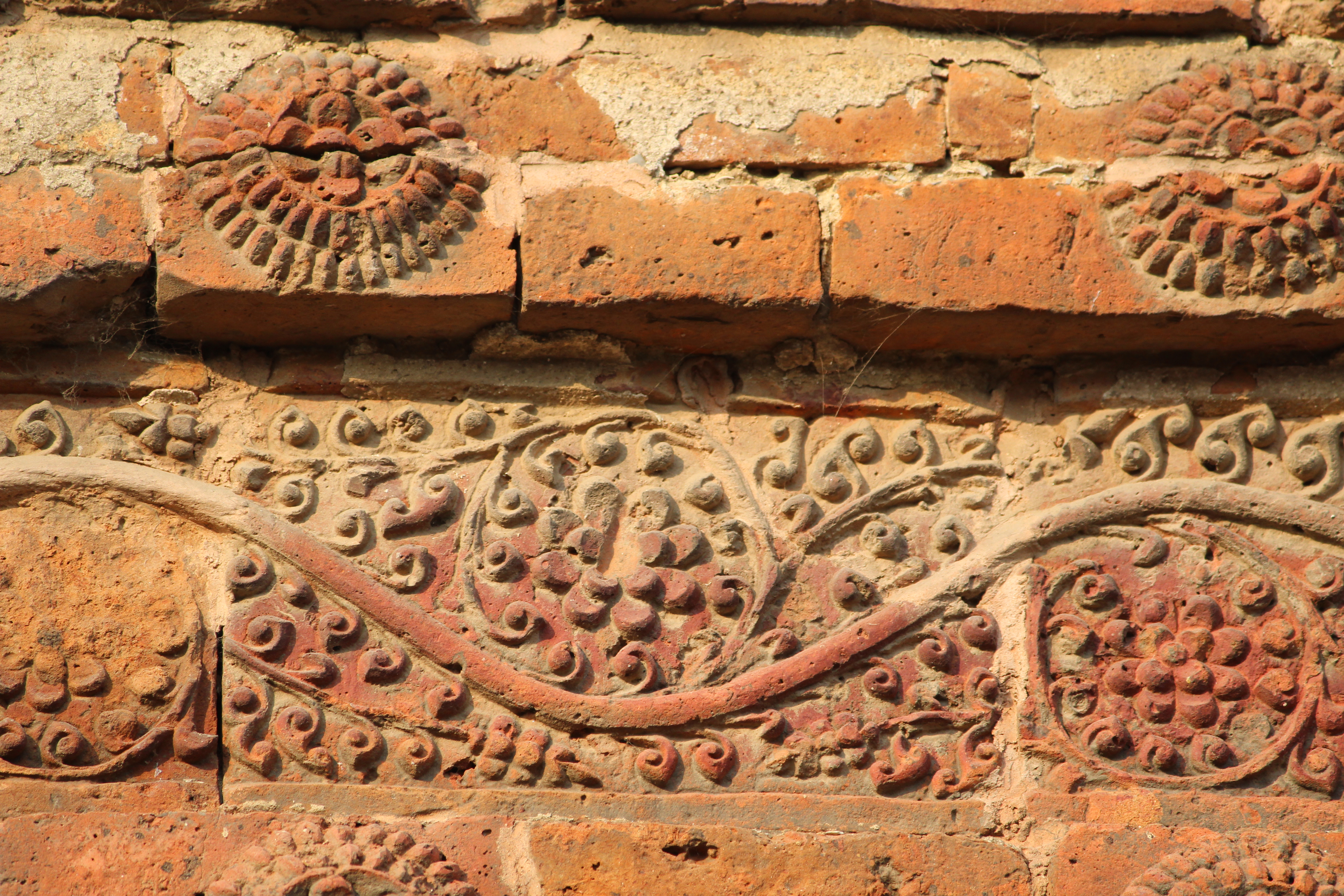
Terracotta decoration on Jora Deul wall

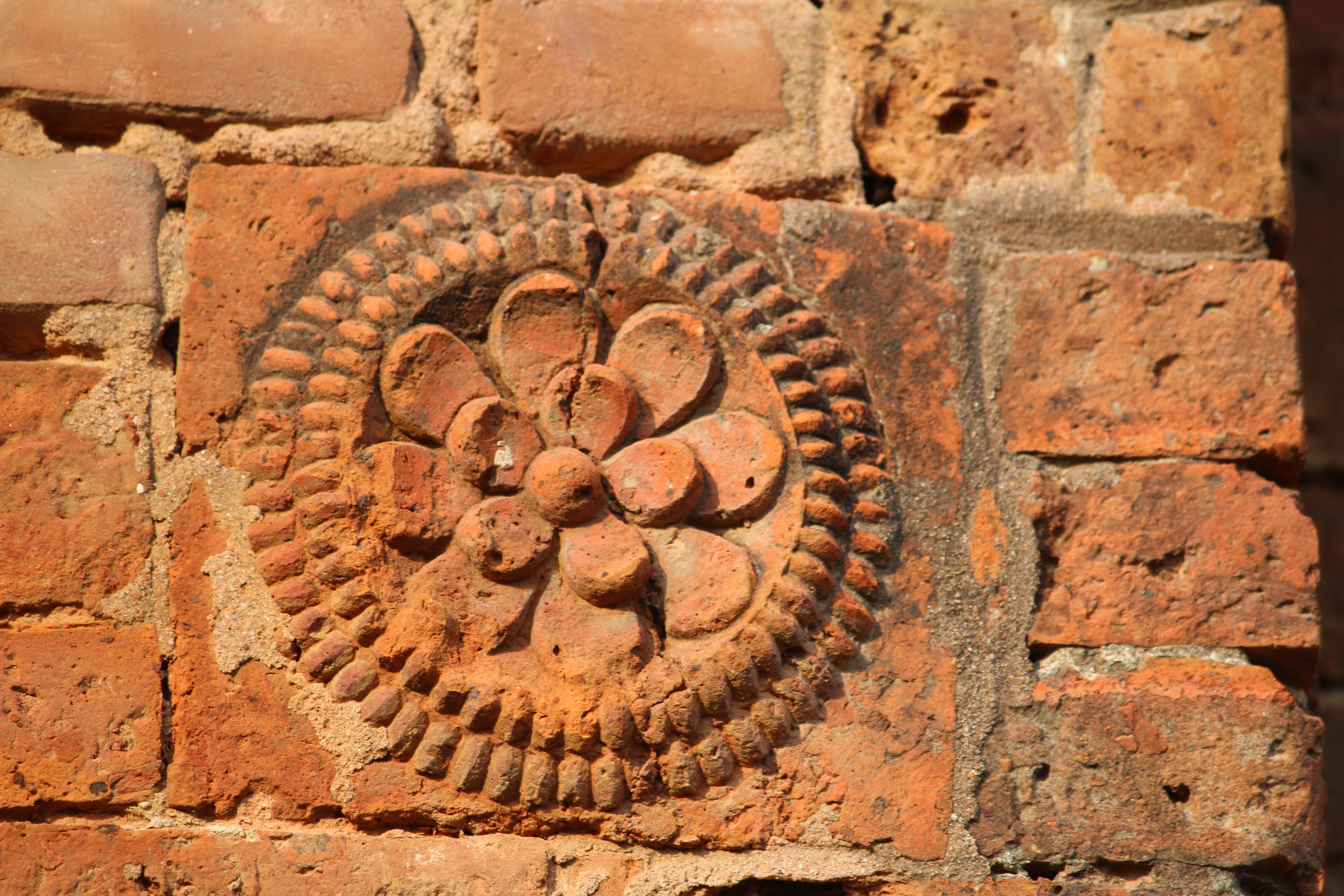
Terracotta decoration on Jora Deul wall

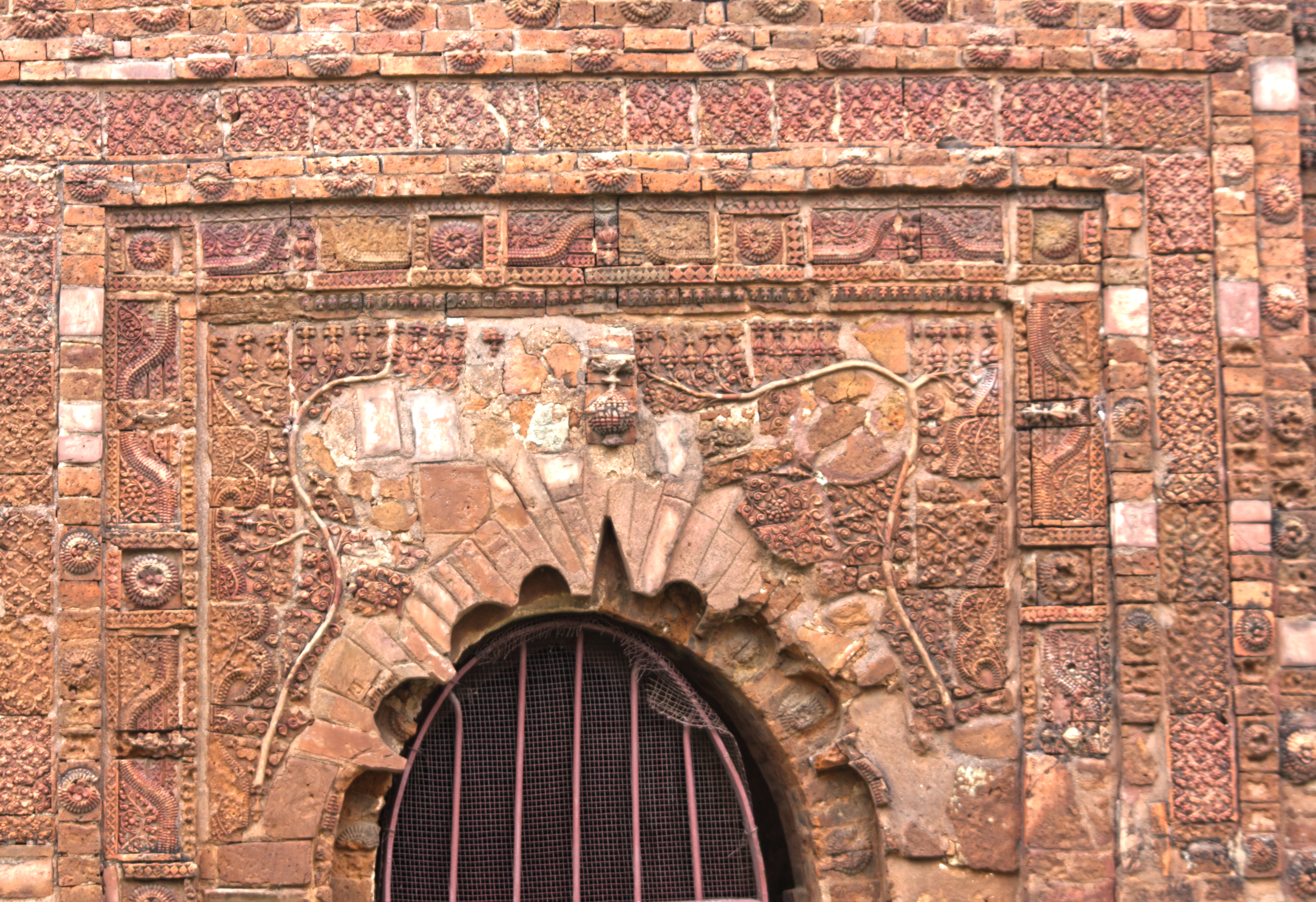
Door decorated with terracotta

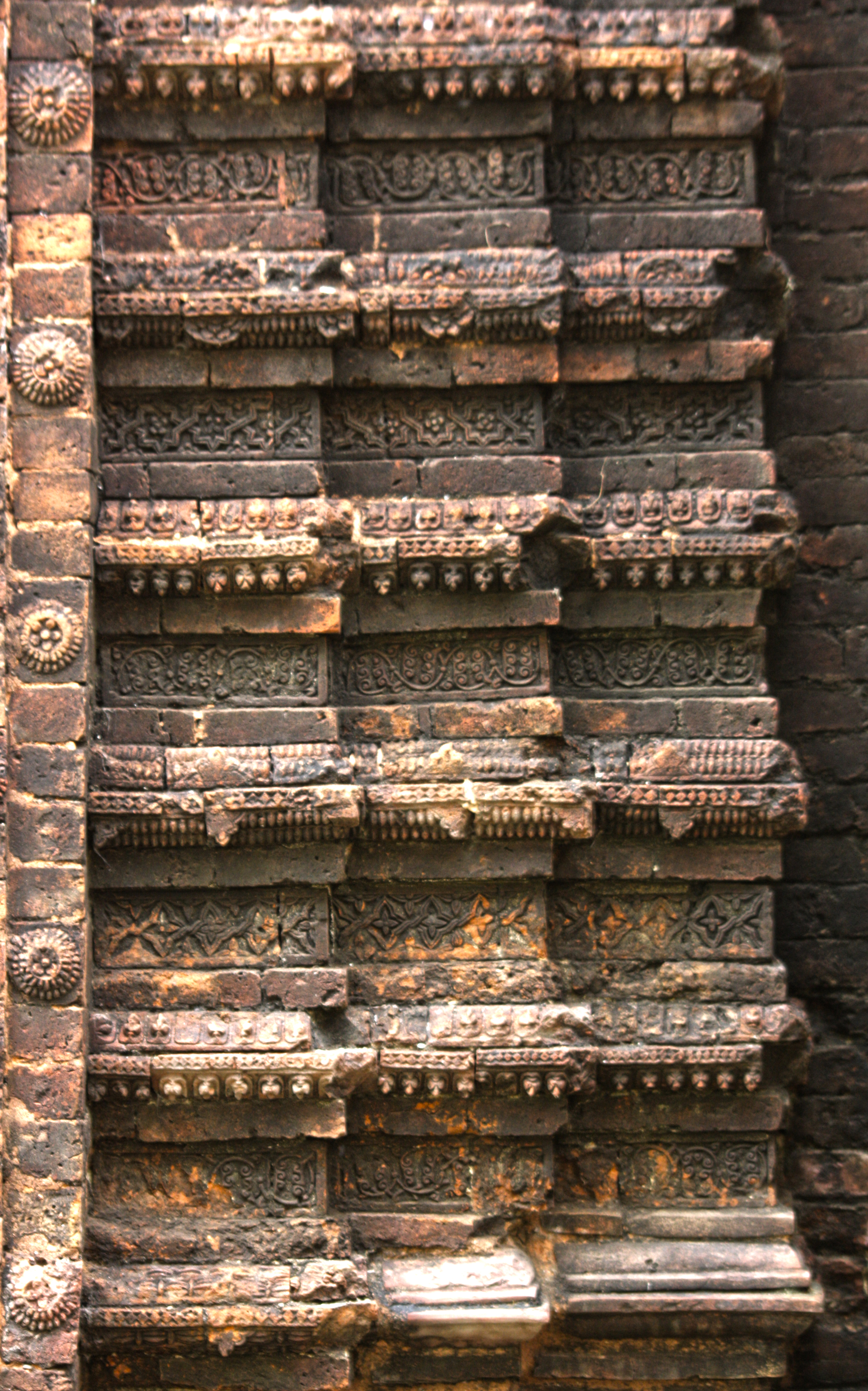

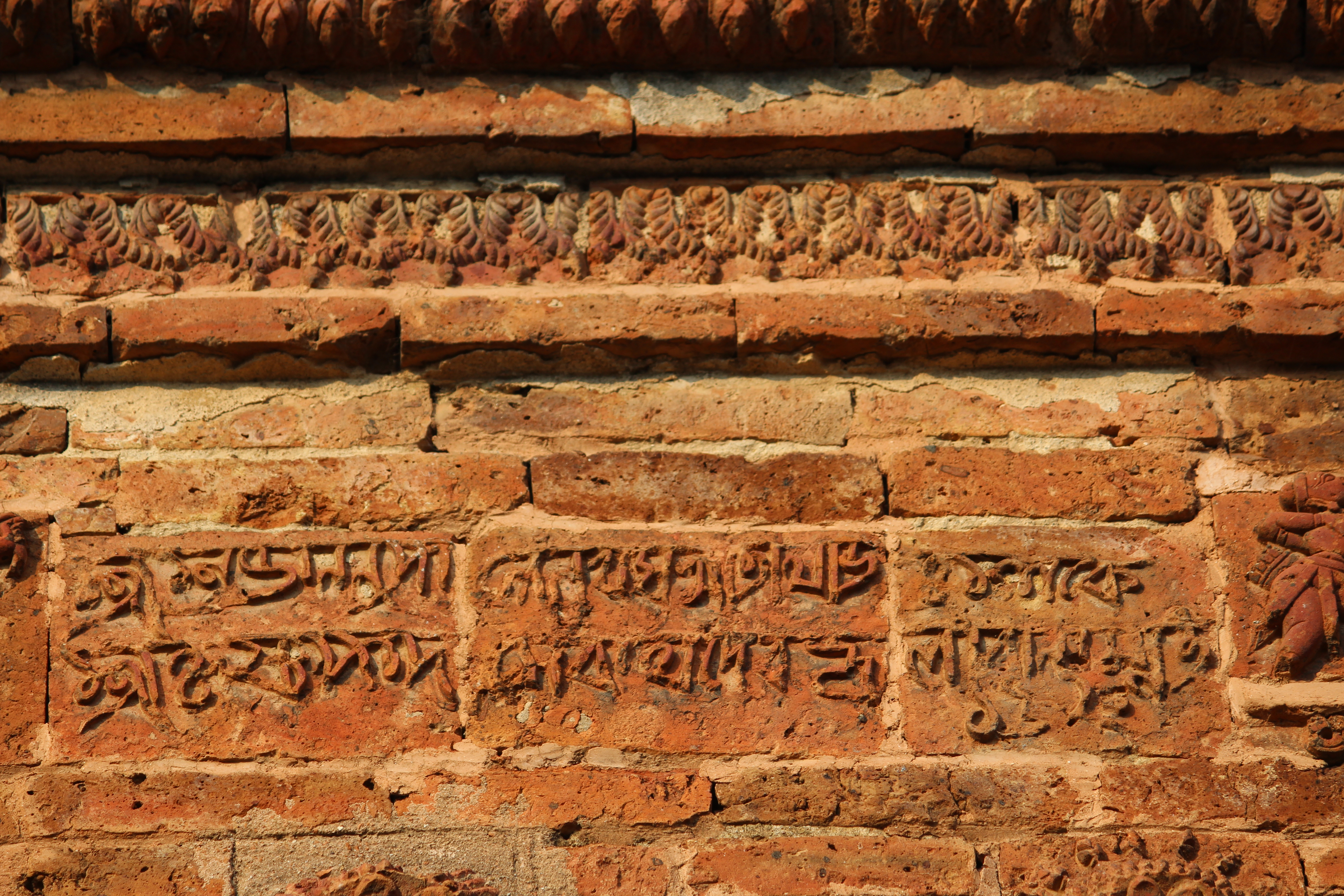
