= Batika =

Census town in West Bengal, India

- Census Town
- Location in West Bengal, India Batika (India)
- Coordinates: 23.1209035°N 88.2012919°E
- Country: India
- State: West Bengal
- District: Hooghly
- Elevation: 21 m (69 ft)

Population (2011)
  - Total: 8,717

Languages
  - Official: Bengali, English
- Time zone: UTC+5:30 (IST)
- PIN: 712134
- Telephone code: 03213
- Vehicle registration: WB

Batika is a census town in Pandua CD Block in Chinsurah subdivision of Hooghly district in the Indian state of West Bengal.

== History ==
Batika is generated by combining shape of some colonies. They are Purbapalli (Formerly Goalapara), Roypara and Majher para or Muslim para.

== Geography ==
Cities and towns in the Chinsurah subdivision (except Polba Dadpur and Dhaniakhali CD Blocks) in Hooghly district
M: municipal city/ town, CT: census town, R: rural/ urban centre,
Owing to space constraints in the small map, the actual locations in a larger map may vary slightly

=== Location ===
Batika is located at 23.1209035 N and 88.2012919 E. It has an average elevation of 21 m ( 69 ft ). Howrah-Bardhaman Main Line passed through the edge of this town. Road density is very good here. Road conditions are excellent. Boinchi-Kalna road ( WB STATE HIGHWAY No 11 ) also passed through the edge of this town. Nearest railway station is Bainchi railway station.

== Demography ==
As of 2011 census Batika had total population of 8717. Males constitute 50.7% and females constitute 49.3% of total population. Among total population 82.36% are literate, higher than national literary rate that is 76%. Among male population 86.61% are literate. Among female population 78.04% are literate. Sex ratio (Male:female) in this town is 1000:971, higher than national average sex ratio.

== Economy ==
This town's two sides are covered by agricultural lands and other two sides are covered by this region's main town Boinchi. Though it is a town, the dependency ratio is high little bit. Total working person figure is 3287. A rice mill is situating here. Very few people are engaged in agriculture. Others are either involved in service or in businesses that are totally non-agricultural.

== Facilities and education ==
It is a settlement based town. Over 2178 houses situating here with all basic urban amenities like water supply, sewerage. Market and other services are excellent here. Road conditions are excellent. Small-medium industries are present here. There are two schools. One is Batika Girls' High school and other is Batika Primary School.

== See also ==
- Boinchi
- Hooghly District
