= Khanyan railway station =

Railway Station in West Bengal, India

Khanyan
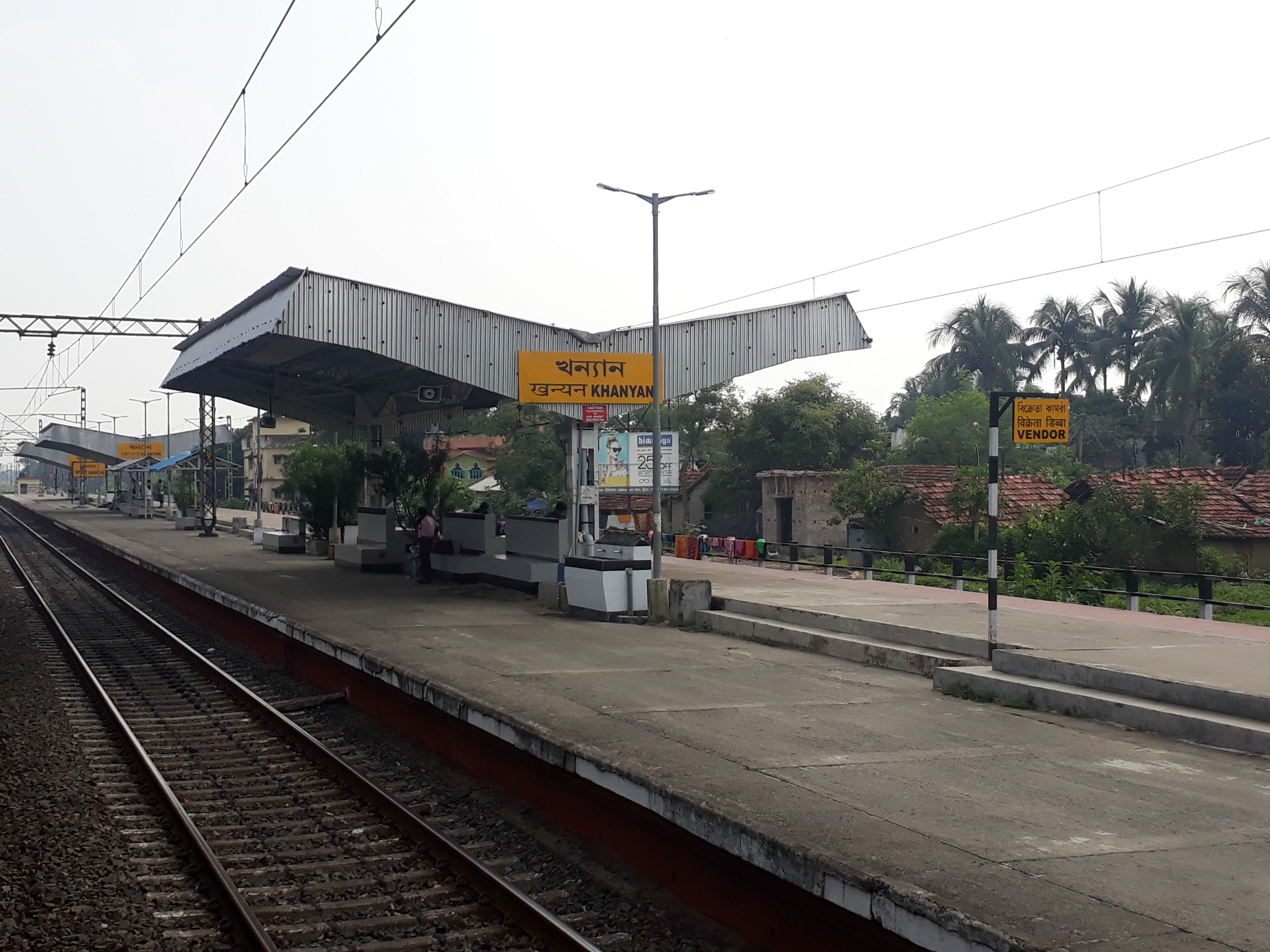
- Khanyan railway station

General information
- Location: Polba-Khanyan Road, Khanyan, Hooghly district, West Bengal; India
- Coordinates: 23°02′47″N 88°18′55″E
- Elevation: 17 metres (56 ft)
- System: Kolkata Suburban Railway
- Owner: Indian Railways
- Operator: Eastern Railway
- Line: Howrah–Bardhaman main line
- Platforms: 2
- Tracks: 2

Construction
- Structure type: Standard (on ground station)
- Parking: No

Other information
- Status: Functioning
- Station code: KHN
- Division(s): Howrah

History
- Opened: 1855; 171 years ago
- Electrified: 1958
- Former names: East Indian Railway Company

Services
Preceding station	Kolkata Suburban Railway	Following station
Talandu towards Howrah Junction	Eastern Line Howrah–Bardhaman main line	Pundooah towards Barddhaman Junction
Route map
Location
- Location within West Bengal Location within India

Khanyan railway station is a Kolkata Suburban Railway station on the Howrah–Bardhaman main line operated by Eastern Railway zone of Indian Railways. It is situated beside Polba-Khanyan Road at Khanyan in Hooghly district in the Indian state of West Bengal.

== History ==
The East Indian Railway Company was formed on 1 June 1845, The first passenger train in the eastern section was operated up to Hooghly, on 15 August 1854. On 1 February 1855 the first train ran from Howrah to Raniganj through Howrah–Bardhaman main line. Bandel to Bardhaman route was opened for traffic on 1 January 1885. Electrification of the Howrah–Bardhaman main line was initiated up to Bandel in 1957, with the 3000 v DC system, and the entire Howrah–Bardhaman route including Khanyan railway station completed with AC system, along with conversion of earlier DC portions to 25 kV AC, in 1958.
