= Debipur, West Bengal =

Debipur R.S.
- Village
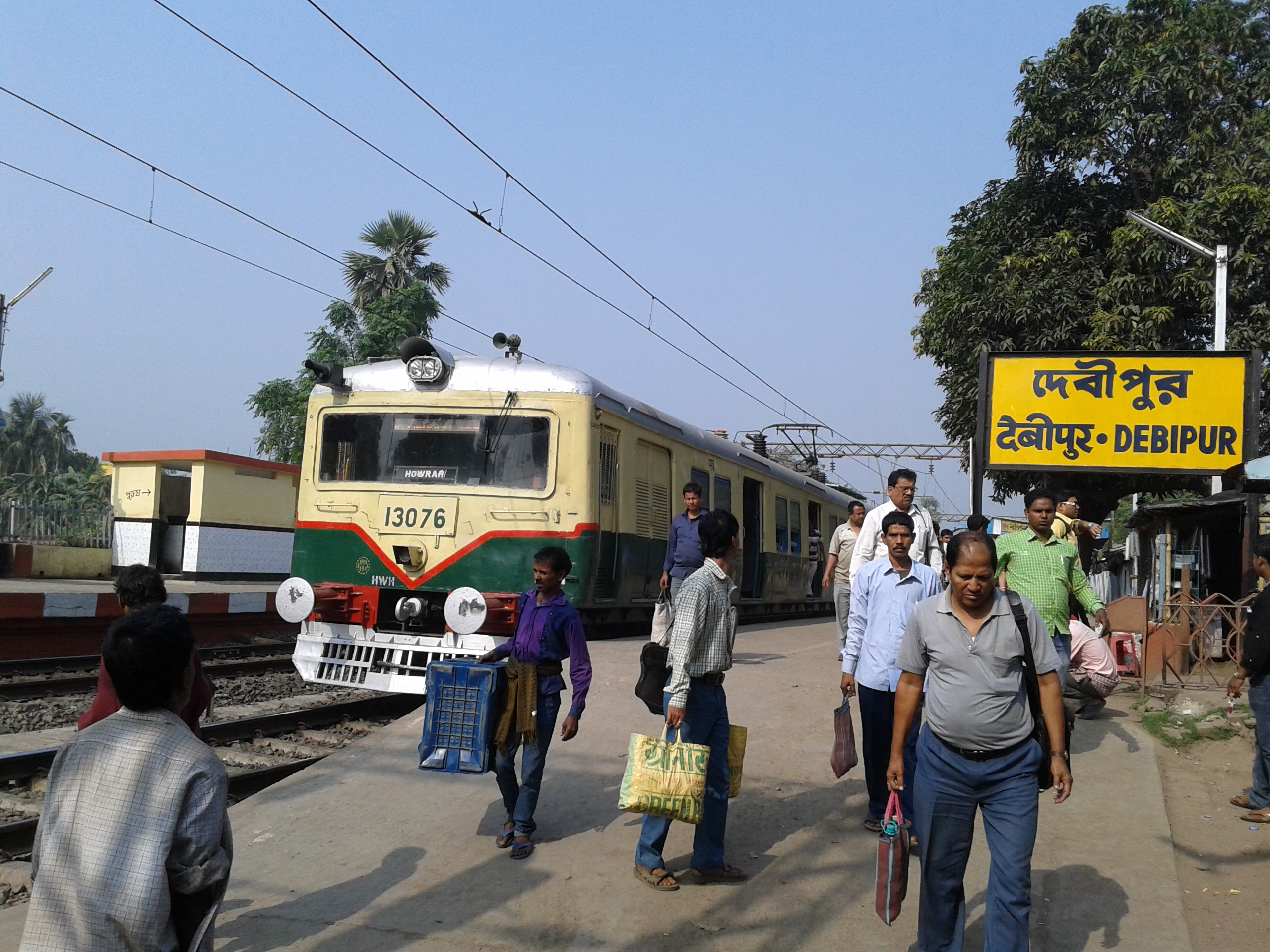

- Location in West Bengal, India Debipur R.S. (India)
- Coordinates: 23.14°N 88.15°E
- Country: India
- State: West Bengal
- District: Purba Bardhaman district
- Elevation: 22 m (72 ft)

Population (2011)
  - Total: 3,175

Languages
  - Official: Bengali, English
- Time zone: UTC+5:30 (IST)
- PIN: 713146
- Telephone/STD code: 0342
- Lok Sabha constituency: Burdwan Purba
- Vidhan Sabha constituency: Memari
- Police Station: Memari
- Website: purbabardhaman.gov.in

Debipur is a village (Census Town) located at Memari I block in Purba Bardhaman district. People called Debipur R.S. because there is a Railway Station. It is under Memari police station. Nearest railway station is Debipur railway station, which is under Eastern Railway and is a part of Kolkata Suburban Railway system. Debipur Railway Station is located in Alipur. Nearest towns near Debipur are Memari, Boinchi. Debipur R.S is a Post Office of many other villages like Alipur, Debipur R.S., and Mobarakpur. There are two High Schools and many primary schools

== Geography ==
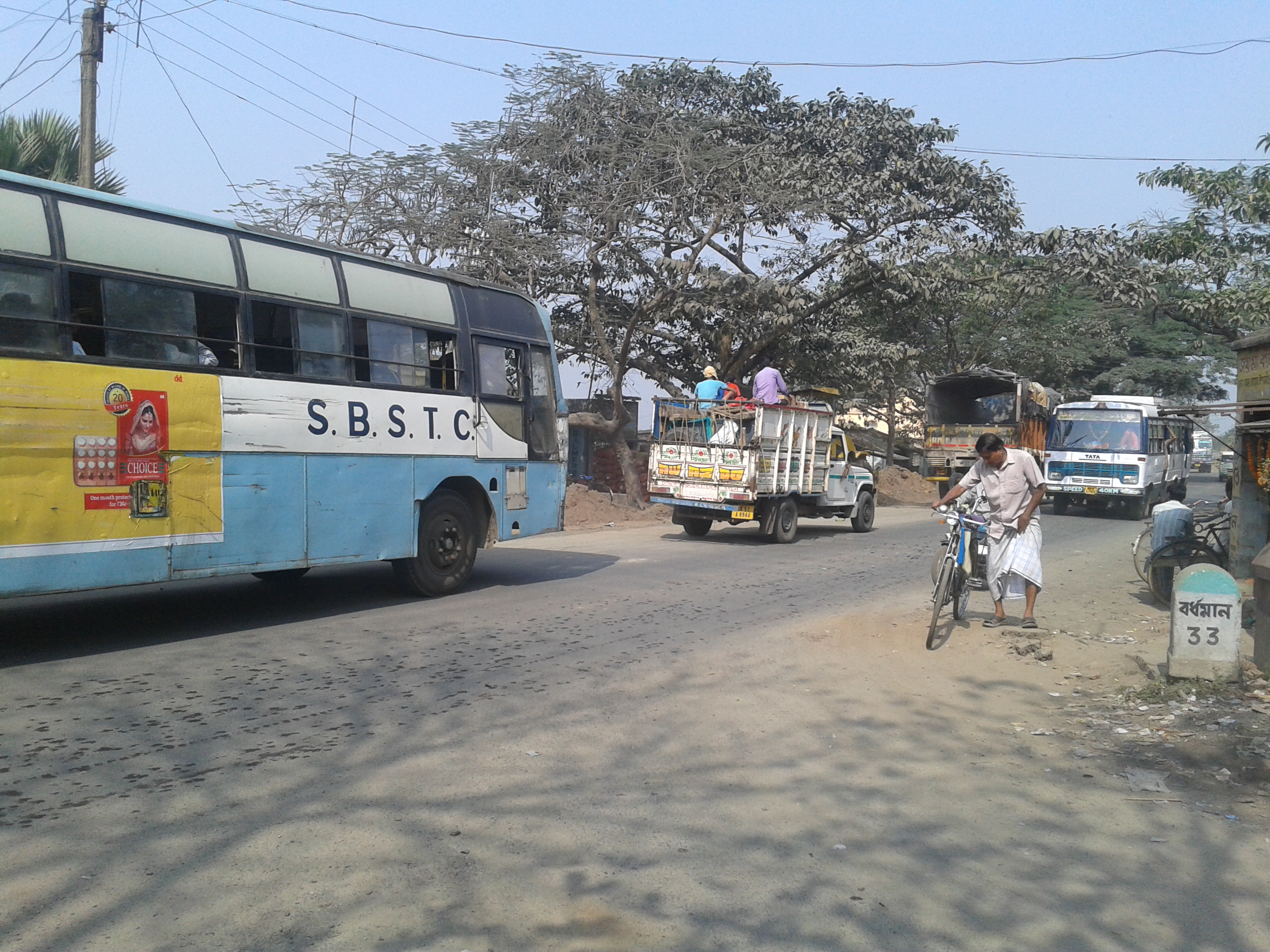
GT Road at Debipur

It is 78 km from Kolkata via Howrah-Bardhaman main line. G.T Road/State Highway 13 (West Bengal) goes through the edge of this village. A D.V.C. canal flows through the middle of this village. Additional areas are Alipur, Mobarakpur, Gram Debipur, Rajbagan Kolony.

== Demographics ==
According to 2011 Census, Debipur had total population of 3175. Among total population, males constitute 50.61% (1607 males) and females constitute 49.38% (1568) of total population. Average literacy rate of this village is 63.46%. 1562 persons are total workers among total population (3175). In total workers, there 70.74% population are directly or indirectly involved in agriculture.

== Education ==
There are many primary schools and three higher secondary schools in this village (Debipur Station High School for both boys' and girls', Debipur Girl's High School and Debipur Adarsha High School).

== Culture ==
Kali Puja is the main festival of this place. Saraswati Puja is another main festival of this place. SnanJatra (Snana Yatra) is also a main Festival in Mobarockpur Village of Debipur.

== Famous Personality ==
Dr. Sunil Kumar Das (ex Headmaster of Hare School, Kolkata) belongs to Debipur Village

The 60’ high Lakshmi Janardana temple established by the Singh family has rich terracotta carvings.

David J. McCutchion describes the Lakshmi Janardana temple (1844) as a rekha deul with ek-bangla porch. There is rich terracotta decoration on three sides of the porch. Particular mention has been made of vegetal/ floral motifs.
