= Ketakadas Kshemananda =

Bengali poet (c. 17th–late 18th century)

- Born: 17th century Rarh, Bengal Presidency, British India (now comprising most of West Bengal and parts of Jharkhand, India)
- Died: late-18th century Bengal Presidency, British India
- Occupation: Poet
- Notable work: Manasar Bhasan (1885)

Ketakadas Kshemananda, also known as Kshemananda Das (c. 17th–late 18th century), was a Bengali poet best known for his work Manasar Bhasan, a rendition of the Manasa Mangal Kavya.

== Development of Manasar Bhasan ==
Manasar Bhasan was part of a Bengali poetic and performance tradition, Mangal Kavya, that was popular in the 13th to 18th centuries, involving sung poetry and religious worship. It tells the story of the snake goddess Manasa, but notably also depicts everyday village life. The text was used as the basis for Chand Manasar Kissa, a play produced by the Sansriti theater company in 2018 and 2019.

== Controversy ==
When Manasar Bhasan was published in the 1880s, the title page created the impression that the work was created by two people, "Ketakadas" and "Kshemananda." This was later discovered to be incorrect. Ketakadas was born in Kanthara village( now Ketara), Tarakeswar; his father's name was Shankar Mondal. Kshemananda was a title given to him.
