= Simlagarh =

- Village
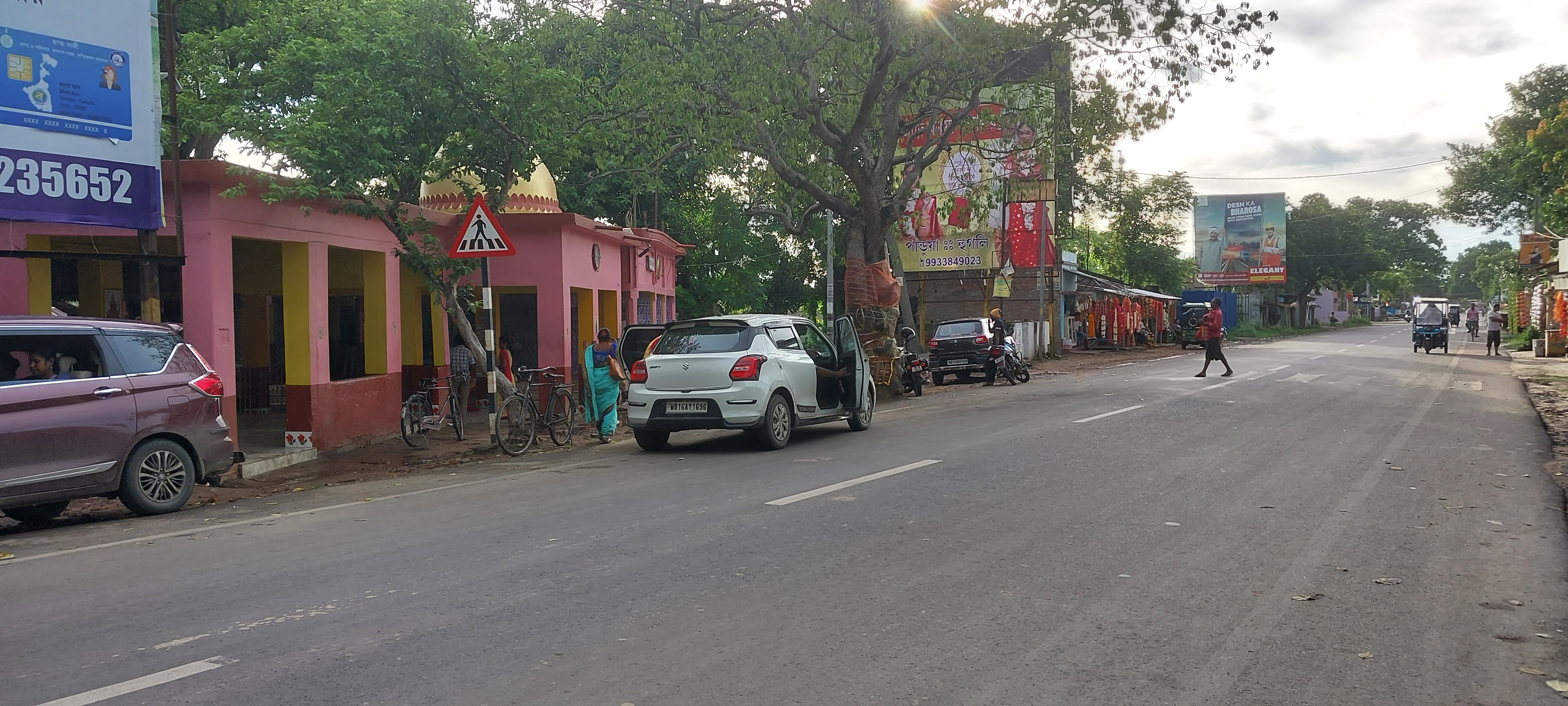
- G.T. Road at Simlagarh

- Location in West Bengal, India
- Coordinates: 23°5′47″N 88°14′00″E
- Country: India
- State: West Bengal
- District: Hooghly
- Elevation: 19 m (62 ft)

Languages
  - Official: Bengali, English
- Time zone: UTC+5:30 (IST)
- Website: hooghly.gov.in

Simlagarh is a small village under Pandua police station of Chinsurah subdivision in Hooghly district in the state of West Bengal, India.

== Demographics ==
As of 2001 India census, Simlagarh had a population of 1491. Males constitute 55% of the population and females 45%. Simlagarh has an average literacy rate of 68%, higher than the national average of 59.5%: male literacy is 75% and, female literacy is 60%. In Simlagarh, 12% of the population is under 6 years of age.

== Transport ==
Simlagarh railway station is situated on Howrah Burdwan main line, which serves Simlagarh Village area. The distance from Howrah station to Simlagarh station is 65 km. Grand Trunk Road passes through Simlagarh.

== Education ==
Simlagarh has ten primary and three secondary schools.
