= Baidyapur =

- Village
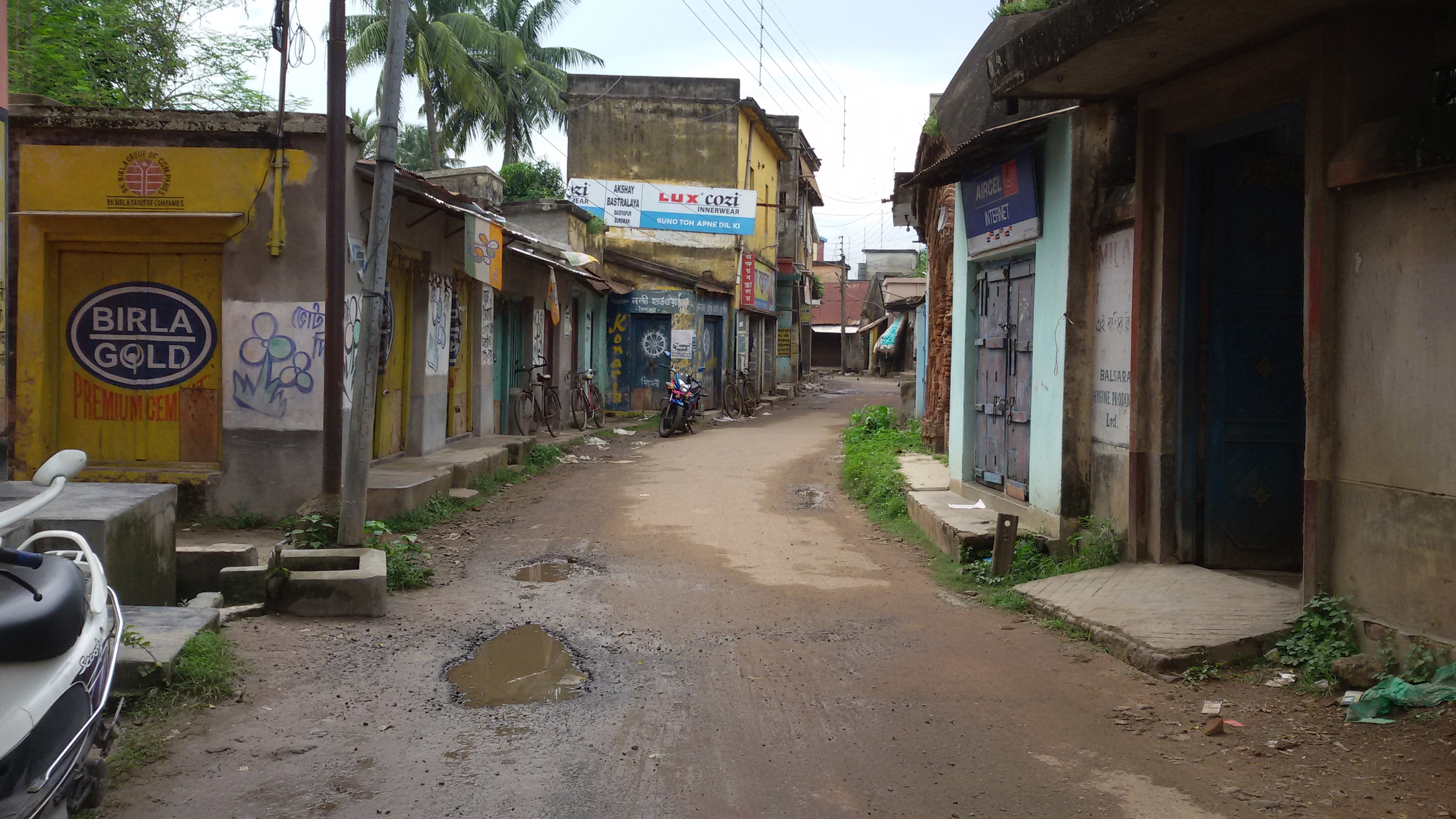

- Location in West Bengal, India Baidyapur (India)
- Coordinates: 23°09′35″N 88°14′45″E
- Country: India
- State: West Bengal
- District: Purba Bardhaman
- Elevation: 12 m (39 ft)

Population (2011)
  - Total: 4,065

Languages
  - Official: Bengali, English
- Time zone: UTC+5:30 (IST)
- PIN: 713122
- Telephone code: 03454
- Website: purbabardhaman.gov.in

Baidyapur is a village in Kalna II CD block in Kalna subdivision of Purba Bardhaman district, West Bengal, India.

== Geography ==
Cities and towns in the Kalna subdivision of Purba Bardhaman district
M: municipal city/ town, CT: census town, R: rural/ urban centre, H: Historical/ religious centre, C: craft centre.
Owing to space constraints in the small map, the actual locations in a larger map may vary slightly

The village is 12 meters above sea level. It has a post office, but the local police station is in Kalna. The village consists of several areas, including Rathtala, Rastala, Gholar Par and Nandipara.

== Education ==
The village has 2 primary schools, 2 higher secondary schools and a school for the deaf and dumb. One of the higher secondary schools, Baidyapur Ramkrishna Vidyapith, is over 100 years old, the other Higher Secondary School is Baidyapur Rajrajeswar Girls' High School. The primary schools are Ranjan Club & Basic School. The school for the deaf & dumb is Baidyapur Bikash Bharati Muk Badhir Pratibandhi Vidyalaya.

== Transport ==
Boinchi is the nearest railway station of Baidyapur. Boinchi-Kalna road passed through middle of this village.

== Demographics ==
As per the 2011 Census of India Baidyapur had a total population of 4,065, of which 2,049 (50%) were males and 2,016 (50%) were females. Population below 6 years was 335. The total number of literates in Baidyapur was 3,134 (84.02% of the population over 6 years).

== Culture ==
The main festivals of this village are Rathyatra and Saraswati Puja. Narkeldanga, a village on the outskirts of Baidyapur celebrates Jagatgouri Jhanpan.

The main places of worship in Baidyapur are: the navaratna (nine towers) temple of Vrindaban Chandra, the Shiva temple of the Nandi family and the Shalagram Shila of Raj Rajeswar.

David J. McCutchion mentions the Bengal deul (1598) with terracotta designs on four sides, the Jora Shiva temple and Shiva temple of the Nandi family (1802) with rich terracotta façade, the straight corniced navaratna temple (1845) of Vrindavana Chandra with plaster festoons and the brick-built, ridged twin deul Krishna temple (1598) with rich terracotta on all sides. He also mentions the navaratna dolmancha with ‘baroque’ vase turrets at Amdabad, near Baidyapur.

According to the List of Monuments of National Importance in West Bengal the two ancient temples (joined) at Baidyapur or Baidyapur Jora Deul is a monument of national importance.

== Healthcare ==
There is a primary health centre at Baidyapur (with 15 beds).

== Gallery ==
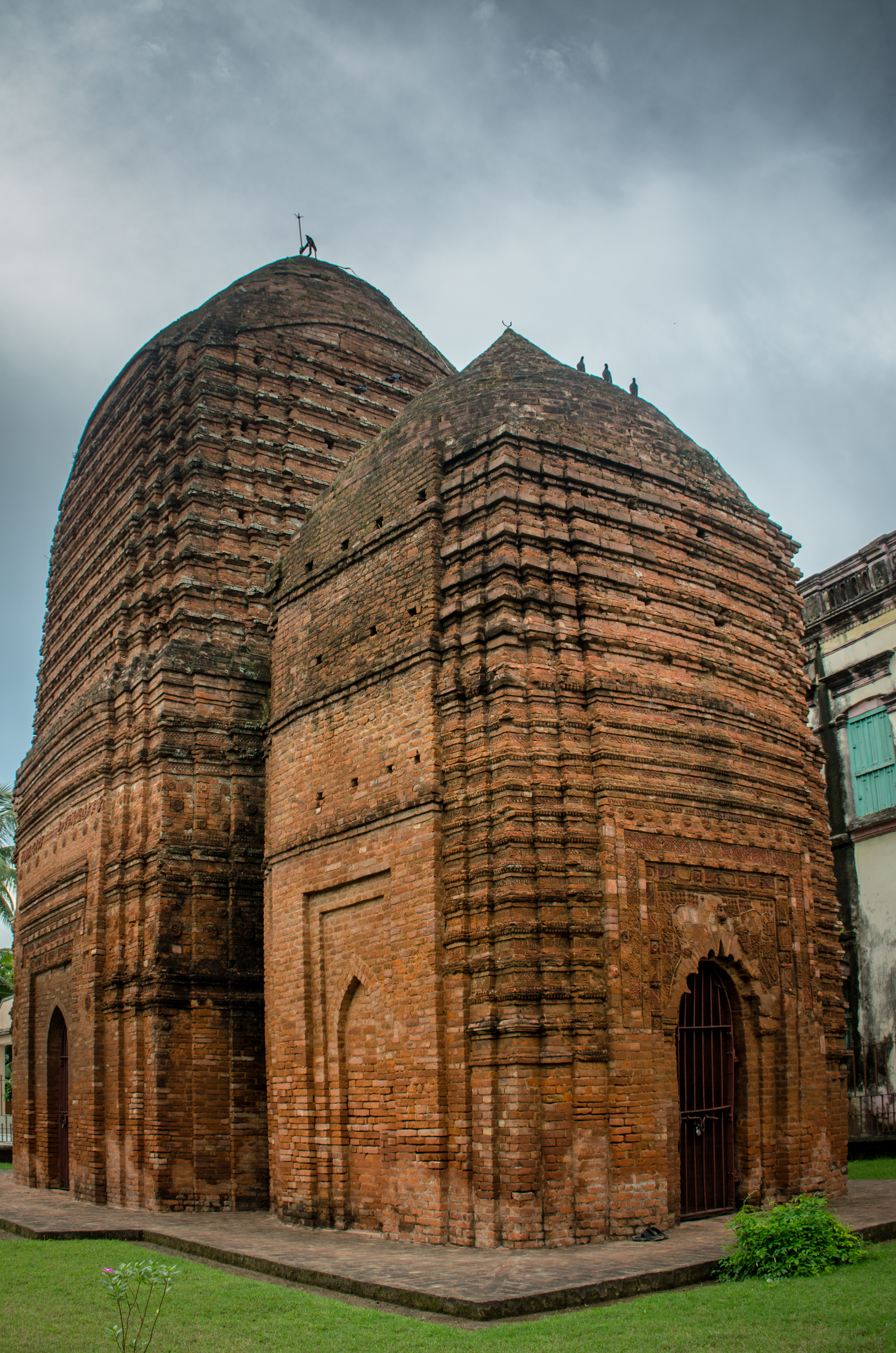
Jora Deul

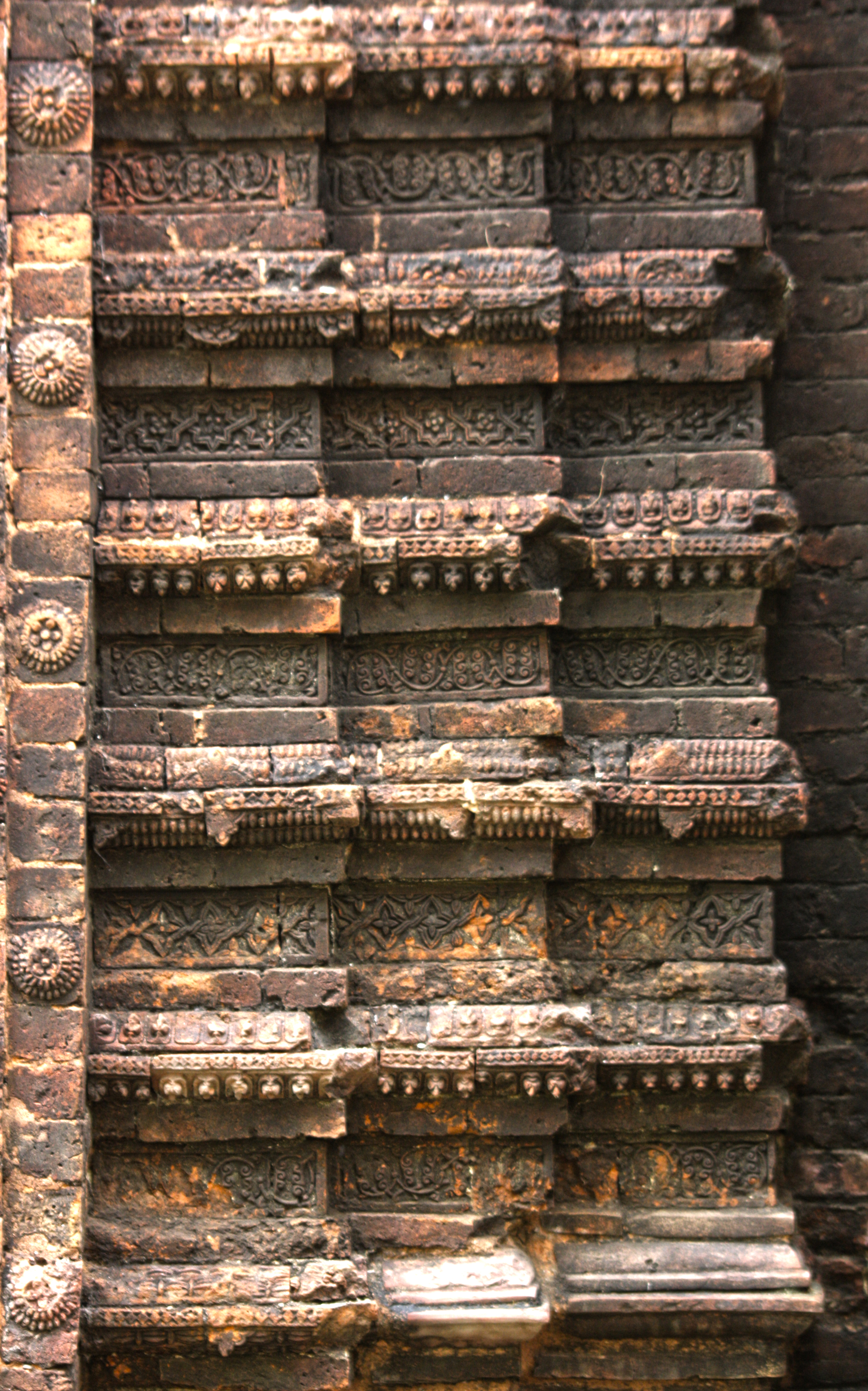
Terracotta panels at Jora deul

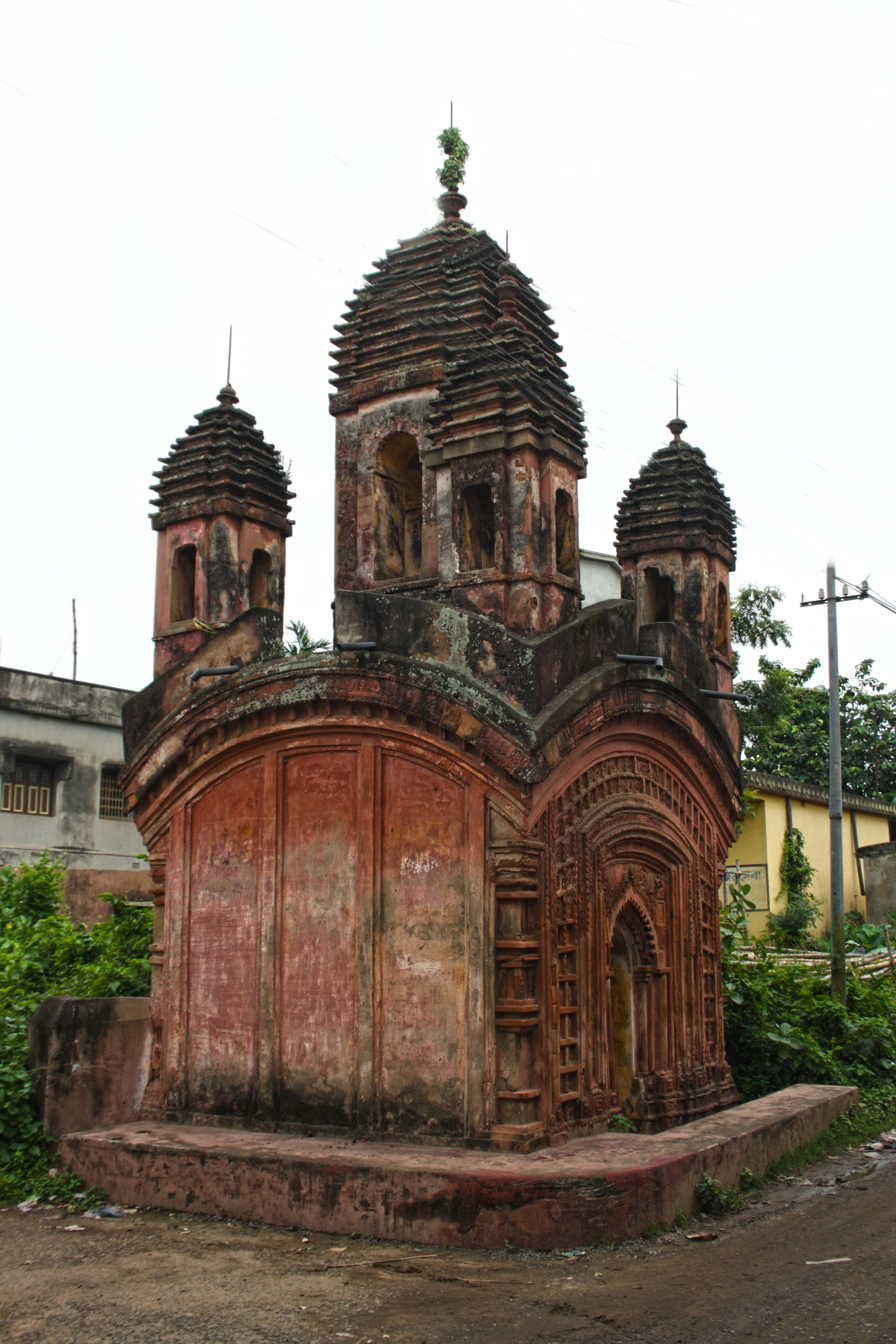
Pancharatna Temple
