= Bhonpur =

- Village
- Location in West Bengal, India Bhonpur (India)
- Coordinates: 23.1396468°N 88.2066305°E
- Country: India
- State: West Bengal
- District: Hooghly
- Elevation: 20 m (66 ft)

Population (2011)
  - Total: 1,572

Languages
  - Official: Bengali, English
- Time zone: UTC+5:30 (IST)
- PIN: 712134
- Telephone code: 03213
- ISO 3166 code: IN-WB

Bhonpur is a village that are located near Boinchi in Hooghly district, West Bengal, India. It is under Pandua police station. Approximately it is 3 km apart from this region's main town Boinchi.

== Origin of the village name ==
It is said that a rock came over the soil. Soil is said Bhnui(ভুঁই) in the local language. So the village is named Bhonpur.

== Education ==
There are two primary schools and a higher secondary school. The name of the higher secondary school is Bhonpur Jajneswar Vidyapith (ESTD: 1953). The name of the primary schools are Bhonpur Primary School & Chetua Primary School. There is a B.Ed. College in the village named Binita Mohanta College of Education. It was established in 2013.

== Population ==
Bhonpur is a large village with total 529 families residing. The Bhonpur village has population of 2410 of which 1195 are males while 1215 are females as per Population Census 2011.

In Bhonpur village, the population of children aged 0-6 is 235, which makes up 9.75% of total population. The average sex ratio of Bhonpur is 1017 which is higher than West Bengal state average of 950. The child sex ratio for the Bhonpur as per census is 1217, which is higher than the West Bengal average of 956.

Bhonpur village has lower literacy rate compared to West Bengal. In 2011, literacy rate of Bhonpur village was 67.77% compared to 76.26% of West Bengal. In Bhonpur male literacy stands at 78.15% while the female literacy rate was 57.37%.

=== Caste factor ===
In Bhonpur village, most of the villagers are from Schedule Caste (SC). Schedule Caste (SC) constitutes 51.00% while Schedule Tribe (ST) were 21.12% of total population in Bhonpur village.

=== Work Profile ===
In Bhonpur village out of total population, 1147 were engaged in work activities. 36.79% of workers describe their work as Main Work (Employment or Earning more than 6 Months) while 63.21% were involved in Marginal activity providing livelihood for less than 6 months. Of 1147 workers engaged in Main Work, 80 were cultivators (owner or co-owner) while 199 were Agricultural labourer.

== Transport ==
Boinchi is the nearest railway station of Bhonpur. Boinchi-Kalna road ( STATE HIGHWAY NO 11 ) passed through edge of this village.

== Festivals ==
Durga Puja, Lakshmi Puja, Sarswati Puja is the main festivals here. Moreover, a local festival named Padmabati Jhanpan also occurs.

== Economy ==
Most of the villagers are cultivators. There is a rice mill in the village. Its name is Malati Rice Mill. It is established in 2013.
