= Boinchi =

Boinchi Bainchi
- Census Town
- Location in West Bengal, India Boinchi (India)
- Coordinates: 23.1190877°N 88.1940661°E
- Country: India
- West Bengal
- District: Hooghly
- Elevation: 28.10 m (92.2 ft)

Population (2011)
  - Total: 21,780

Languages
  - Official: Bengali, Hindi
- Time zone: UTC+5:30 (IST)
- PIN: 712134
- Telephone code: 03213

Boinchi (also spelt Bainchi or Boinchee) is a Census town located in Hooghly District in the Indian state of West Bengal. It is under Pandua Police Station in Chinsurah subdivision. The town is located approximately 71 kilometers from Kolkata via Howrah-Bardhaman Main Line. The nearest Railway Station is Bainchi railway station, which is under the Eastern Railway and a part of Kolkata Suburban Railway System.

== History ==
The name 'Boinchi' has come from a fruit - "Boinchifol" since British Colonial Period.

== Geography ==
This town is located in 23.125107N, 88.197531E. It has an average elevation of 28.10 metres. This town includes with some colonies like Batika, Berela, Vivekananda Pally (formerly Garoan para), Charabagan, Nunia Danga, Telcopa, Halder Dighi etc. and surrounded by some villages like Boinchigram, Bhonpur, Paira, Kochmali, Boragori, Hatni, Bilsara etc. ThisThe town is well connected by roads and railway. Howrah-Bardhaman Main Line passes through the town. State Highway 13 (West Bengal), and State Highway- 11 (Kalna- Boinchi-Gurap Road) serves the town.

== Economy ==
As per 2011 Census India report, in this town - the percentage of population deployed in agriculture is quite low. Majority of total population is deployed in non - agricultural sectors. Small and medium types of industries are situating here.

== Demographics ==
As per 2011 Census of India Boinchi had a total population of 21,780. Males constitute 50.51% (11,002 males) and females constitute 49.48% (10,778) of total population. Average literacy rate is 70.34% .75.69% of male population are literate. 65.81% of female population are literate.

== Facilities and education ==
It is a semi-urban town, providing major types of urban facilities. The town has three primary schools, one secondary school, two higher secondary schools, one B.ED college and one technical college.

== Jagaddhatri Puja ==
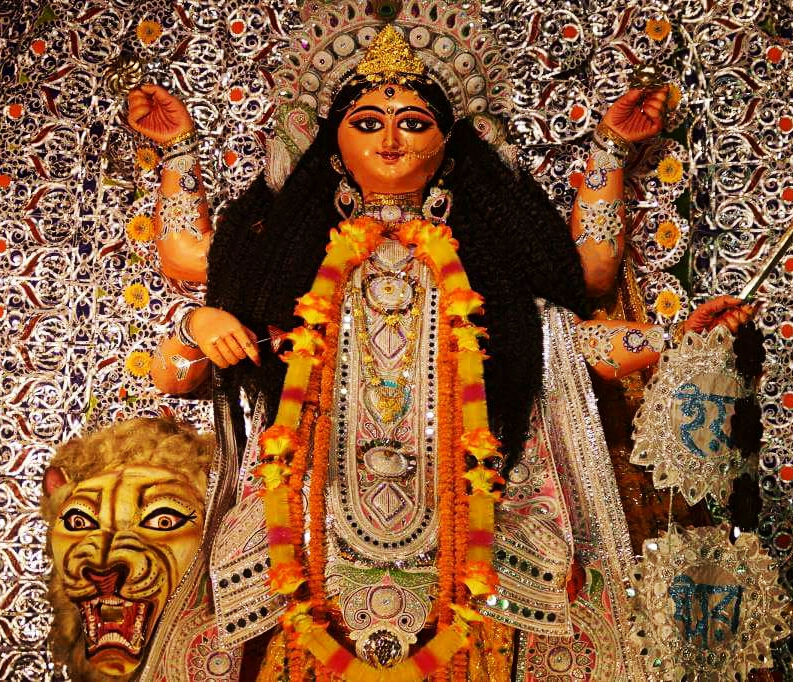
Youngstar club's Protima 2015

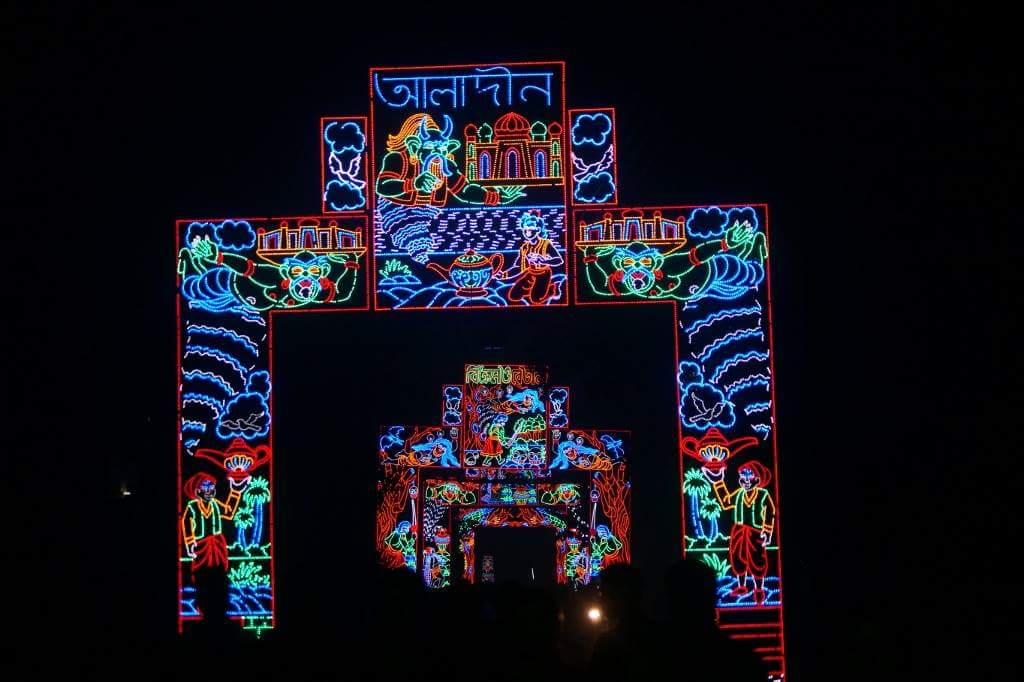
Lighting during "Jagaddhatri Puja"

This town is well known for its Jagaddhatri Puja. Besides Chandannagar, this town also organise very good "Jagaddhatri puja" with quality of "pandels", lights and "pratimas" every year since when Young Star club introduced first "Jagaddhatri Puja" in 1983 at Boinchi.In 2018, 25 clubs have taken part under "Boinchi Jagadhatri Central Committee".
