= Raniganj railway station =

Railway station in West Bengal, India

RANIGANJ

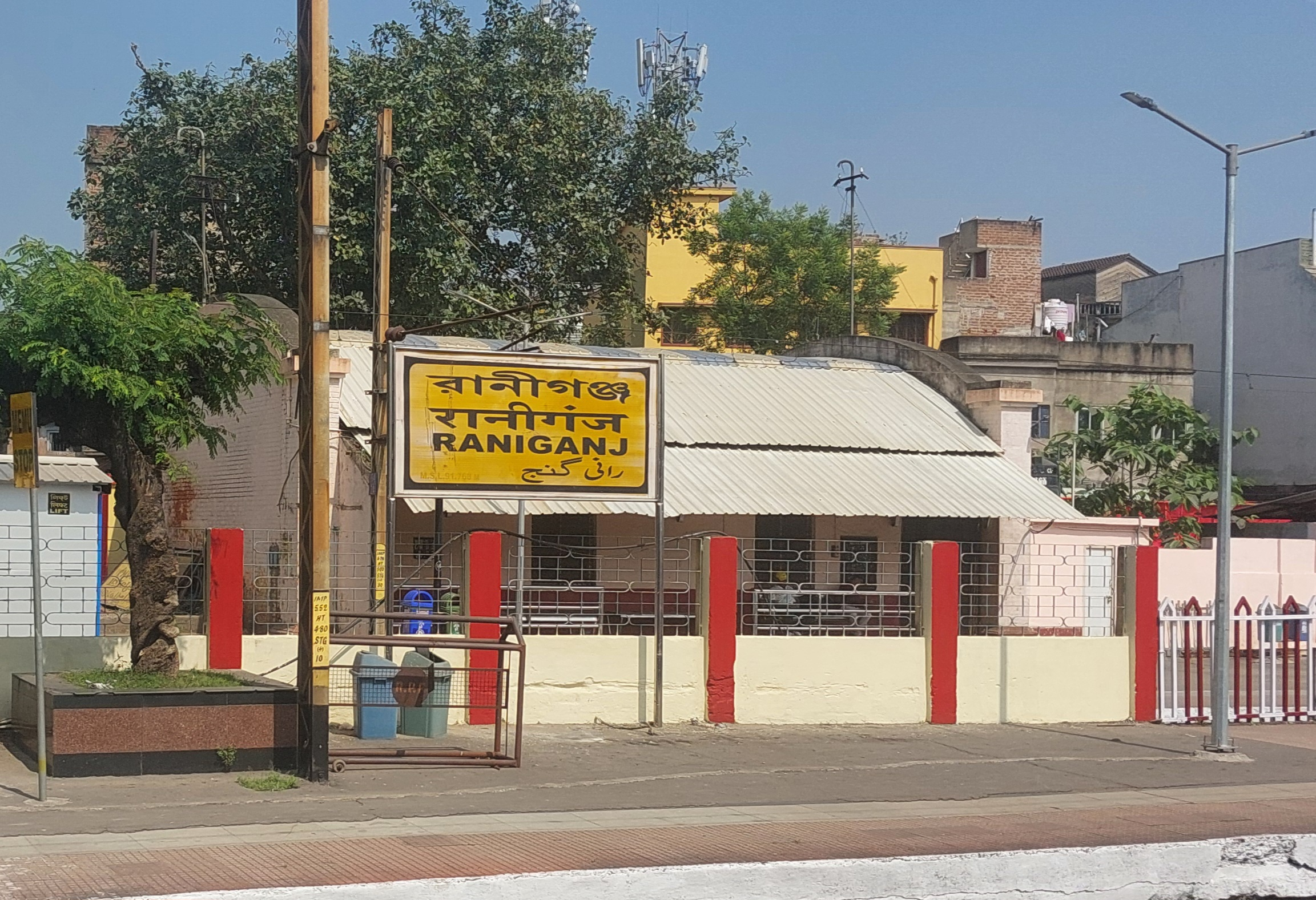
- Raniganj railway station

General information
- Location: Station Road, Raniganj, Asansol, West Bengal; India
- Coordinates: 23°36′13″N 87°07′03″E
- Elevation: 92 metres (302 ft)
- System: Indian Railways station
- Owner: Indian Railways
- Operator: Eastern Railway
- Lines: Bardhaman–Asansol section Howrah–Delhi main line Howrah–Gaya–Delhi line Howrah–Allahabad–Mumbai line
- Platforms: 4

Construction
- Structure type: Standard (on-ground station)
- Parking: Yes
- Cycle facilities: Yes

Other information
- Status: Functioning
- Station code: RNG
- Zone(s): ER
- Division(s): Asansol

History
- Opened: 1856
- Electrified: 1960–61
- Former names: East Indian Railway Company
Location
- Location within West Bengal Location within India
- Interactive map of Raniganj

Raniganj is a railway station on the Bardhaman–Asansol section. It is located in Asansol, Paschim Bardhaman district in the Indian state of West Bengal. It lies in the heart of Raniganj Coalfield and serves the neighbourhood of Raniganj in Asansol, and the surrounding mining-industrial area of Asansol.

== Overview ==
=== Mining-industry zone ===
"The entire belt between Durgapur (158 km from Howrah), and all the way up to Dhanbad and beyond is industrialized. Apart from factories, there are many coalmines, some closed now, and some with fires burning deep in the mineshafts. The mining area extends for a large area, mostly to the south of the tracks. Quite a portion of the track passes through cuttings, where the surrounding area is higher than the track level, resulting in the profusion of characteristic small masonry bridges crossing the tracks."

== History ==
The first passenger train in eastern India ran from Howrah to Hooghly on 15 August 1854. The track was extended to Raniganj by 1855.

== Electrification ==
The Waria–Asansol sector was electrified in 1960–61.

Preceding station	Indian Railways	Following station
Baktarnagar towards Barddhaman Junction	Eastern Railway zone Bardhaman–Asansol section	Kalipahari towards Asansol Junction
