= Sahaganj =

Sahaganj সাহাগঞ্জ Sahagunj
- Urban area
- Location in West Bengal, India Sahaganj (India)
- Coordinates: 22.94225°N 88.398769°E
- Country: India
- State: West Bengal
- Division: Burdwan
- District: Hooghly
- Subdivision: Chinsurah

Government
  - Type: Municipality
  - Body: Bansberia and Hooghly Chinsurah Municipality

Languages
  - Official: Bengali, English
- Time zone: UTC+5:30 (IST)
- PIN: 712104
- Telephone code: +91 33
- Vehicle registration: WB
- Lok Sabha constituency: Hooghly
- Vidhan Sabha constituency: Chunchura
- Website: hooghly.gov.in

Sahaganj is an urban area of Bandel of Hooghly district in the Indian state of West Bengal. Ward no 1 of Bansberia covers a part of Sahaganj. It is a part of the area covered by Kolkata Metropolitan Development Authority (KMDA).

== Geography ==
Bandel-Saptagram Area as it is today
R: rural/ urban centre, F: facility, H: historical site
Owing to space constraints in the small map, the actual locations in a larger map may vary slightly

Ward No. 1 of Bansberia Municipality and parts of Ward Nos. 1, 2 and 3 of Hooghly Chinsurah Municipality cover Sahaganj.

== Demographics ==
According to the 2011 Census of India, Ward No. 1 of Bansberia municipality had a total population of 2,089 of which 1,084 (51%) were males and 1,005 (49%) were females. Population in the age range 0–6 years was 143. The total number of literate persons in Ward No. 1 was 1,721 (88.44% of the population over 6 years).

== Dunlop at Sahaganj ==
Dunlop India Ltd. opened its first factory in India at Sahaganj in 1936. It pioneered the manufacture of cycle, automobile and aeroplane tyres. In 1952, it started producing foam cushioning, transmission belting and Vee belts. Conveyor belting and long length braided hose were added to the range later on.

In 1984, Manu Chhabria, the Dubai-based Indian businessman, arrived in India as a "corporate raider". He picked up a controlling stake, in association with the R. P. Goenka’s RPG Group, in Dunlop India, which was then ailing. He subsequently took single-handed control of the company.

The Sahaganj factory faced major hurdles, first with a 97-days strike by trade unions in 1988, and then in the early nineties with conflicting vision and strategies of the professional managers and owners over falling fortunes of the company. Several top executives, including the managing director, Murli Dhar Shukla, left the company. In 1998, the management of Dunlop moved the BIFR for registration as a sick company. Manu Chhabria died in 2002, and Pawan Kumar Ruia purchased Dunlop in 2005 from the Chhabria family controlled Jumbo Group. At the time of take over, the plant at Sahaganj was closed and employed 2,700 workers. It was taken out of BIFR in 2007. Amongst the other units in Pawan Kumar Ruiya's kitty is Jessop & Company.

Both the earlier Left Front government and the present Trinamul Congress government, in West Bengal, have expressed concern about the state of affairs in Dunlop India, for many years a blue-chip company, but, except for short periods in 2008, 2011 and 2014, Dunlop’s Sahaganj factory has remained closed. In 2011, 800 employees remained on its rolls.

== Transport ==
State Highway 6 (West Bengal)/ Grand Trunk Road skirts the western edge of Sahaganj.

== Education ==
- Dunlop English Medium School is located in Dunlop Estate at Sahaganj.
- Sahaganj Dunlop Hindi School is located in Ward No. 1 of Bansberia Municipality. It was established in 1961.
- Sahaganj Dunlop High School is a Bengali-medium high school located in Ward No. 1 of Bansberia Municipality. It was established in 1952.
- Saraswati World School is located near Dunlop Mor at Sahaganj.
