= Maheswarpur =

- Village
- Location in West Bengal, India Maheswarpur (India)
- Coordinates: 22.56°N 88.11°E
- Country: India
- State: West Bengal
- District: Hooghly
- Elevation: 14 m (46 ft)

Population (2001)
  - Total: 1,200

Languages
  - Official: Bengali, English
- Time zone: UTC+5:30 (IST)
- Lok Sabha constituency: Hooghly

Maheswarpur (also spelled Moisapur) is a small village in Chinsurah subdivision of Hooghly district in the Indian state of West Bengal). It is at the intersection of National Highway 2 (NH 2, also known as Durgapur Expressway) and 17-18 Bus Route. This village is 6 km from Singur. The nearest railway station of Maheswarpur is Dhaniakhali, via Howrah-Burdwan chord line and the nearest Howrah-Burdwan main line station is Chinsurah.

== Geography ==
Maheswarpur is located at 22.56°N 88.11°E. It is situated on the Ganges delta. This village is rectangle shaped, bounded by some neighbor villages like Jampur, Hodla, Kharsat, Gondopur. A river has crossed on south-west of Maheswarpur.
