= Chinsurah subdivision =

- Subdivision
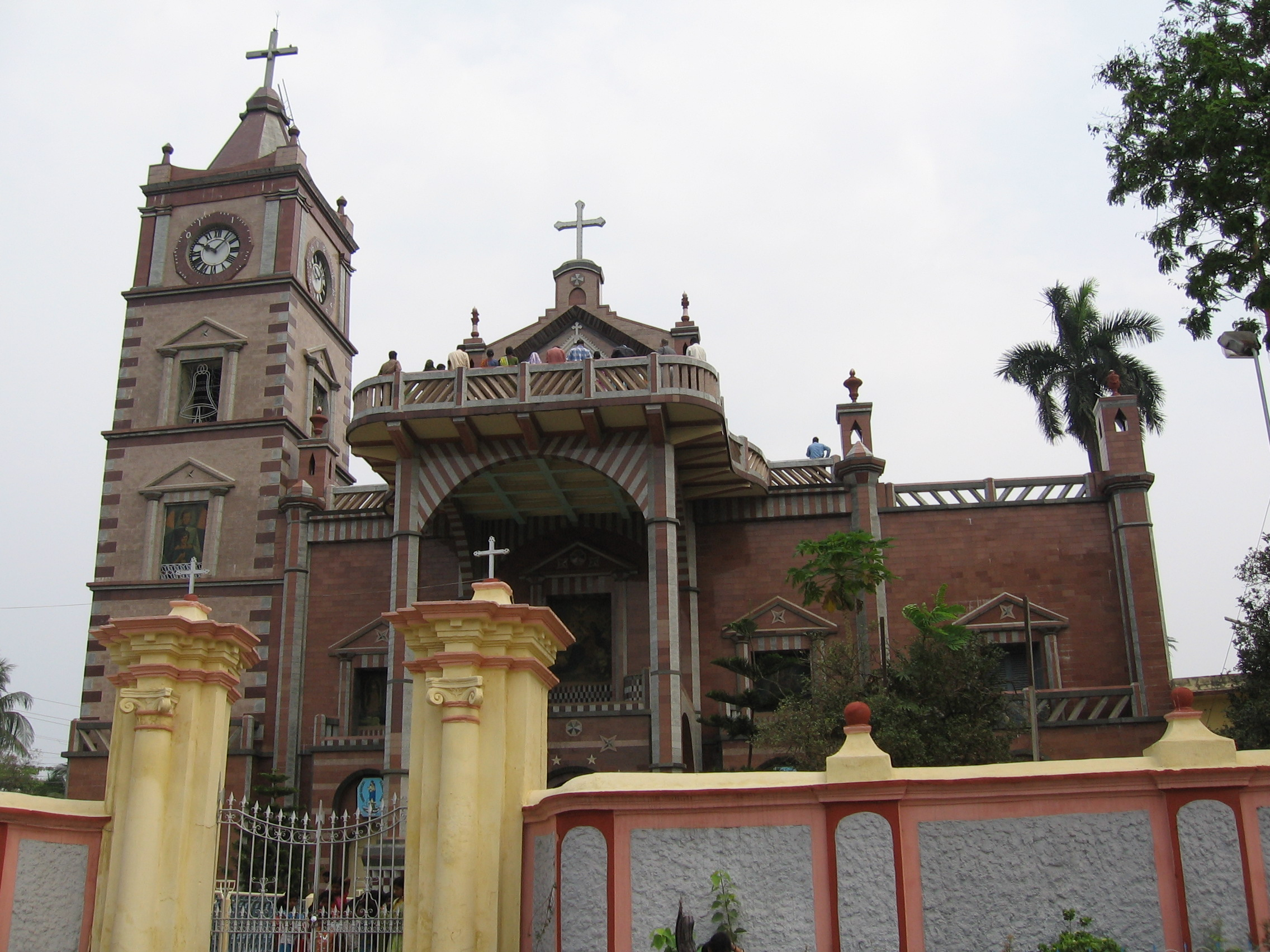
- Bandel Church, founded in 1599, by the Portuguese, the oldest place of Christian worship in Bengal

- Coordinates: 22.90°N 88.39°E
- Country: India
- State: West Bengal
- District: Hooghly
- Headquarters: Hugli-Chuchura

Area
  - Total: 1,148.15 km^{2} (443.30 sq mi)

Population (2011)
  - Total: 1,657,518
  - Density: 1,443.64/km^{2} (3,739.02/sq mi)

Languages
  - Official: Bengali, English
- Time zone: UTC+5:30 (IST)
- ISO 3166 code: ISO 3166-2:IN
- Vehicle registration: WB
- Website: wb.gov.in

Chinsurah subdivision is an administrative subdivision of the Hooghly district in the state of West Bengal, India.

== Overview ==
The eastern portion of Chinsurah subdivision is part of the Hooghly Flats, a natural physiographic region, that is a narrow strip of land along the Hooghly. The interior of the subdivision is part of the Hooghly-Damodar Plain, the agriculturally rich alluvial plains lying between the two rivers. The entire area is a part of the Gangetic Delta. The Hooghly is a tidal river and has a high west bank. The Portuguese, the Dutch, the French, the Danes and the British dominated industry, trade and commerce in this area for more than two centuries, and as a result the Hooghly Flats region is highly industrialised.

== Subdivisions ==
The Hooghly district is divided into the following administrative subdivisions:

Subdivision	Headquarters	Area km^{2}	Population (2011)	Rural population % (2011)	Urban population % (2011)
Chinsurah	Hugli-Chuchura	1,148.15	1,657,518	68.63	31.37
Chandannagore	Chandannagar	508.08	1,127,176	58.52	41.48
Srirampore	Serampore	422.45	1,469,849	26.88	73.12
Arambag	Arambag	1,058.87	1,264,602	94.77	5.23
Hooghly district	Chinsurah	3,149.00	5,519,145	61.43	38.57

Cities and towns in the Chinsurah subdivision (except Polba Dadpur and Dhaniakhali CD Blocks) in Hooghly district
M: municipal city/ town, CT: census town, R: rural/ urban centre,
Owing to space constraints in the small map, the actual locations in a larger map may vary slightly

== Administrative units ==
Chinsurah subdivision has 9 police stations, 5 community development blocks, 5 panchayat samitis, 69 gram panchayats, 756 mouzas, 741 inhabited villages, 2 municipalities, 1 outgrowth and 23 census towns. The municipalities are Hooghly Chinsurah Municipality and Bansberia Municipality. The census towns are: Kola, Hansghara, Raghunathpur, Madhusudanpur, Amodghata, Alikhoja, Shankhanagar, Chak Bansberia, Manushpur, Keota, Kodalia, Naldanga, Kulihanda, Dharmapur, Simla, Badhagachhi, Mirdhanga, Sripur, Jirat, Batika, Pandua, Purusattompur and Namajgram. The subdivision has its headquarters at Hugli-Chuchura.

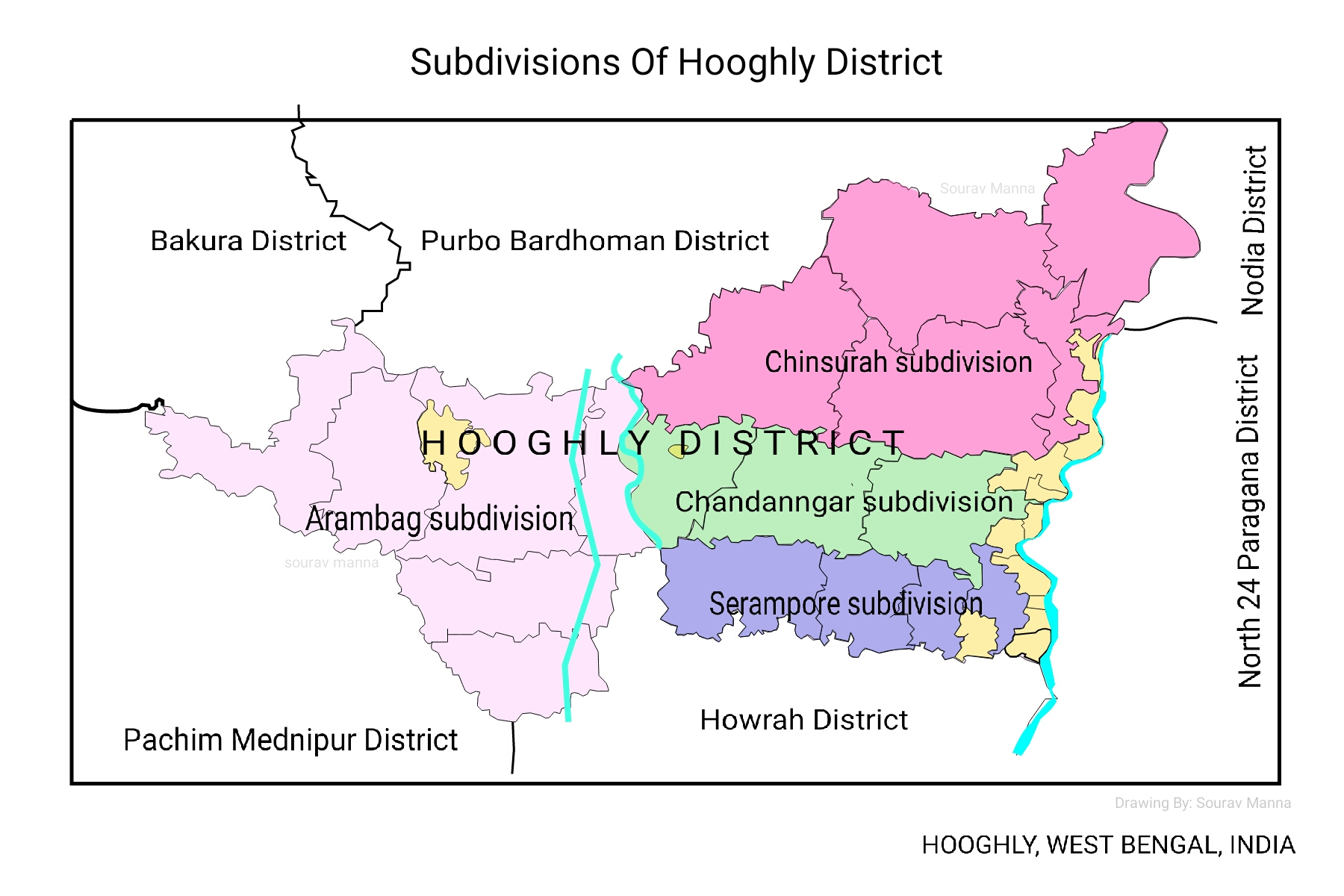

The right bank of the Hooghly River has been industrialised over a long period. With the leading European powers dominating the area's industry, trade and commerce for over two centuries, it is amongst the leading industrialised areas in the state. At the same time the land is fertile and agricultural production is significant.

In Chinsurah Mogra CD Block 64.87% of the population is urban and 35.13% is rural. Amongst the four remaining CD Blocks in the subdivision two are overwhelmingly rural and two are wholly rural.

The map alongside shows a portion of Chinsurah subdivision. All places marked in the map are linked in the larger full screen map.

== Kolkata Urban Agglomeration ==
The following Municipalities, Outgrowth and Census Towns in Chinsurah subdivision were part of Kolkata Urban Agglomeration in the 2011 census: Hugli-Chinsurah (M), Bansberia (M), Bara Khejuria (Out Growth), Shankhanagar (CT), Amodghata (CT), Chak Bansberia (CT), Naldanga (CT), Kodalia (CT), Kulihanda (CT), Simla (CT), Dharmapur (CT) and Keota (CT).

== Police stations ==
Police stations in Chinsurah subdivision have the following features and jurisdiction:

Police station	Area covered km^{2}	Municipal town	CD Block
Dhaniakhali	n/a	-	Dhaniakhali (partly)
Gurap	n/a	-	Dhaniakhali (partly)
Pandua	n/a	-	Pandua
Balagarh	n/a	-	Balagarh
Chinsurah	n/a	Hugli-Chuchura, Bansberia	Chinsurah Mogra (partly)
Chinsurah (Women)	n/a	Hugli-Chuchura	-
Mogra	n/a	Bansberia	Chinsurah Mogra (partly)
Polba	n/a	-	Polba Dadpur
Dadpur	n/a	-	Polba Dadpur

== Blocks ==
Community development blocks in Chinsurah subdivision are:

CD Block	Headquarters	Area km^{2}	Population (2011)	SC %	ST %	Hindus %	Muslims %	Literacy rate %	Census Towns
Balagarh	Patuligram, Jirat	202.15	228,998	40.79	9.23	89.24	8.81	76.94	4
Chinsurah Mogra	Mogra	81.86	247,055	29.51	3.64	87.80	10.39	83.01	15
Pandua	Pandua	276.43	316,197	32.04	15.36	68.58	24.15	75.16	4
Dhaniakhali	Dhaniakhali	275.68	320,534	33.01	14.26	80.85	16.34	75.66	-
Polba Dadpur	Barun Napara	285.69	263,555	35.79	11.47	77.93	19.29	75.14	-

== Gram panchayats ==
The subdivision contains 69 gram panchayats under 5 community development blocks:

- Balagarh block consists of 13 gram panchayats, viz. Baklia Dhobapara, Ektarpur, Somra–I, Charkrishnabati, Guptipara–I, Somra–II, Dumurdaha Nityanandapur–I, Guptipara–II, Sripur–Balagarh, Jirat, Dumurdaha Nityanandapur–II, Mohipalpur and Sija Kamalpur.
- Chinsurah Mogra block consists of 10 gram panchayats, viz. Bandel, Debanandapur, Kodalia–II, Saptagram, Chandrahati–I, Digsui Hoyera, Mogra–I, Chandrahati–II, Kodalia–I and Mogra–II.
- Dhaniakhali block consists of 18 gram panchayats, viz. Belmuri, Dashghara–II, Gudubari–I, Perambua Sahabazar, Bhandarhati–I, Dhanekhali–I, Gudubari–II, Bhandarhati–II, Dhanekhali–II, Gurap, Somaspur–I, Bhastara, Gopinathpur–I, Khajudaha Milki, Somaspur–II, Dashghara–I, Gopinathpur–II and Mandra.
- Pandua block consists of 16 gram panchayats, viz. Bantika-Boinchee, Jamna, lchhobadaspur, Rameswarpur–Gopalnagar, Beloon Dhamasin, Jamnagar Mondalai, Panchagara–Toregram, Berela-Konchmali-Boragori, Jayer Dwarbasini, Shikhira Chanpta, Haral Daspur, Kshirkundi–Namajgram–Niyasa, Simlagarh Vitasin, Itachuna Khanyan and Sarai–Tinna.
- Polba Dadpur block consists of 12 gram panchayats, viz. Akhna, Dadpur, Mahanad, Rajhat, Amnan, Goswami Malipara, Makalpur, Satithan, Babnan, Harit, Polba and Sugandha.

== Economy ==
=== Industry ===
Industries are concentrated in the cities and towns of the Chinsurah Mogra area (outside the CD Block area), along the Hooghly. In the 17th and 18th centuries different industrial units came into existence with the development of various European settlements along the Hooghly. Initially, it was traditional industries, but later comparatively heavier industries came in. Amongst the better known industrial units in Chinsurah subdivision are:

- Dunlop India Ltd. opened its factory at Sahaganj in 1936 and it pioneered the manufacture of a number of products such as automobile and aeroplane tyres, and produced industrial belting later. Pawan Kumar Ruia of the Ruia group, acquired Dunlop from Manu Chhabria’s Jumbo Group in 2005, but has been struggling ever since to restart the closed Sahaganj factory.
- Tribeni Tissues is owned by Paper Boards and Speciality Papers Division of ITC Ltd. at Tribeni.
- The 450 MW Bandel Thermal Power Station, operated by West Bengal Power Development Corporation, was established at Tribeni in 1983.
- Ascon Agro Products Limited, jointly owned by the SPS Group and the Pailan Group, produces potato flakes at Dhaniakhali. It is locally marketed using the POTO brand. Potato flakes are used to make snacks and are also used as a thickening agent in soups and bakery products. The plant was inaugurated by Buddhadeb Bhattacharjee, the West Bengal chief minister, in 2007.
- S.R.Industry, manufacturer of construction and agricultural machinery, was established at Pandua in 1996.

=== Handloom weaving ===
The handloom sarees of Dhaniakhali, Begampur, Jangipara, Rajbalhat areas and dhutis of Haripal, Rajbalhat, Khanakul areas of Hooghly district are widely familiar.

=== Agriculture ===
Hooghly is an agriculturally prosperous district of West Bengal. Although the economy has been shifting away from agriculture, it is still the pre-dominant economic activity and the main source of livelihood for the rural people of the district. One third of the district income comes from agriculture. Given below is an overview of the agricultural production (all data in tonnes) for Chinsurah subdivision, other subdivisions and the Hooghly district, with data for the year 2013-14.

CD Block/ Subdivision	Rice	Wheat	Jute	Pulses	Oil seeds	Potatoes	Sugarcane
Dhaniakhali	64,054	83	25,499	-	5,118	95,184	-
Pandua	40,707	-	-	-	865	288,975	-
Balagarh	57,671	4	80,440	4	2,176	60,285	-
Chinsurah Mogra	10,572	5	560	-	167	106,280	-
Polba Dadpur	65,557	-	4,719	-	2,036	262,084	162
Chinsurah subdivision	235,561	92	111,218	4	10,362	812,808	162
Chandannagore subdivision	189,791	12	136,276	-	6,522	313,692	-
Srirampore subdivision	126,852	11	39,820	12	8,058	436,111	2,437
Arambag subdivision	255,011	75	134,541	30	19,477	514,903	123,934
Hooghly district	807,215	190	421,855	46	44,419	2,077,514	126,533

== Education ==
Hooghly district had a literacy rate of 81.80% as per the provisional figures of the census of India 2011. Chinsurah subdivision had a literacy rate of 79.17%, Chandannagore subdivision 83.01%, Srirampore subdivision 86.13% and Arambag subdivision 79.05.

The table below (data in numbers) gives a comprehensive picture of the education scenario in Hooghly district for the year 2013-14:

Subdivision	Primary School		Middle School		High School		Higher Secondary School		General College, Univ		Technical / Professional Instt		Non-formal Education	
Subdivision	Institution	Student	Institution	Student	Institution	Student	Institution	Student	Institution	Student	Institution	Student	Institution	Student
Chinsurah	899	85,213	46	3,885	98	48,722	109	124,068	7	16,342	26	10,564	2,413	45,289
Chandannagore	606	53,382	32	3,312	46	22,000	77	89,132	6	20,450	6	778	1,297	29,127
Srirampore	577	64,207	25	3,611	65	37,997	97	108,199	8	16,631	3	793	1,337	33,060
Arambag	935	80,705	49	5,462	83	48,513	76	91,911	7	16,950	3	228	1,838	57,383
Hooghly district	3,013	283,407	152	16,270	292	157,232	359	413,310	28	70,373	38	12,363	6,885	164,859

Note: Primary schools include junior basic schools; middle schools, high schools and higher secondary schools include madrasahs; technical schools include junior technical schools, junior government polytechnics, industrial technical institutes, industrial training centres, nursing training institutes etc.; technical and professional colleges include engineering colleges, medical colleges, para-medical institutes, management colleges, teachers training and nursing training colleges, law colleges, art colleges, music colleges etc. Special and non-formal education centres include sishu siksha kendras, madhyamik siksha kendras, centres of Rabindra mukta vidyalaya, recognised Sanskrit tols, institutions for the blind and other handicapped persons, Anganwadi centres, reformatory schools etc.

The following institutions are located in Chinsurah subdivision:

- Hooghly Mohsin College was established at Chinsurah in 1836.
- Hooghly Women's College was established at Chinsurah in 1949.
- Hooghly Engineering and Technology College is an engineering college, established at Pipulhati in 2004.
- Abacus Institute of Engineering and Management is an engineering college, established at Natungram, Mogra, in 2008.
- Academy of Technology is an engineering college, established at Adisaptagram, Aedconagar in 2003.
- Camelia Institute of Technology & Management, is an engineering college, established at Boinchi in 2009. It offers both degree and diploma courses.
- Techno India Group Public School, Chinsurah, Hooghly is a CBSE affiliated senior secondary school which was established in 2005 offering education from Play Group to Std. XII.
- Saroj Mohan Institute of Technology, is an engineering college, established at Guptipara in 2003.
- Modern Institute of Engineering and Technology, is an engineering college, established at Barol-Malimpur, Rajhat (near Bandel) in 2010.
- Bengal School of Technology was established in 2006 at Sugandha. It offers undergraduate and post graduate courses in pharmacy.
- Polba Mahavidyalaya, a general degree college, was established at Polba in 2005.
- Balagarh Bijoy Krishna Mahavidyalaya (Jirat College), a general degree college, was established at Jirat in 1985.
- Sarat Centenary College, a general degree college, was established at Dhaniakhali in 1978.
- Bejoy Narayan Mahavidyalaya, a general degree college, was established at Itachuna in 1950.
- Sreegopal Banerjee College, a general degree college, was established at Bagati, Mogra, in 1958.
- Government Training College, a teachers' training college, established at Hugli-Chuchura in 1955.
- Indira Gandhi Teachers’ Training College was established at Sultangachha, Pandua.

== Healthcare ==
The table below (all data in numbers) presents an overview of the medical facilities available and patients treated in the hospitals, health centres and sub-centres in 2014 in Hooghly district.

Subdivision	Health & Family Welfare Deptt, WB				Other State Govt Deptts	Local bodies	Central Govt Deptts / PSUs	NGO / Private Nursing Homes	Total	Total Number of Beds	Total Number of Doctors*	Indoor Patients	Outdoor Patients
Subdivision	Hospitals	Rural Hospitals	Block Primary Health Centres	Primary Health Centres	Other State Govt Deptts	Local bodies	Central Govt Deptts / PSUs	NGO / Private Nursing Homes	Total	Total Number of Beds	Total Number of Doctors*	Indoor Patients	Outdoor Patients
Chinsurah	1	2	3	24	-	-	-	31	61	1,091	108	94,213	1,830,358
Chandannagore	1	3	-	8	-	-	-	41	53	828	56	70,724	1,105,060
Srirampore	3	2	2	12	-	-	-	80	99	1,894	85	63,619	1,252,941
Arambag	1	1	5	16	-	-	-	35	58	919	57	83,469	1,743,719
Hooghly district	6	8	10	60	-	-	-	187	271	4,732	306	312,025	5,932,078

.* Excluding nursing homes

Medical facilities in Chinsurah subdivision are as follows:
Hospitals: (Name, location, beds)
Hugli District Hospital, Hooghly Chinsurah Municipality, 550 beds
Chunchura Police Hospital, Hooghly Chinsurah Municipality, 98 beds
Hugli Jail Hospital, Hooghly Chinsurah Municipality, 27 beds
Bandel ESI Hospital, Chinsurah Mogra CD Block, PO Bandel, 250 beds
Bandel Railway Hospital, Polba Dadpur CD Block, PO Bandel, 4 beds
Bandel Thermal Power Station Hospital, Bansberia Municipality, PO Tribeni, 10 beds

Rural Hospitals: (Name, block, location, beds)
Pandua Rural Hospital, Pandua CD Block, Pandua, 30 beds
Dhaniakhali Rural Hospital, Dhaniakhali CD Block, Dhaniakhali, 30 beds
Mogra Rural Hospital, Chinsurah Mogra CD Block, Mogra, 30 beds
Ahmedpur Rural Hospital, Balagarh CD Block, Patuligram, 30 beds
Polba Rural Hospital, Polba Dadpur CD Block, Polba, 30 beds

Primary Health Centres: (CD Block-wise)(CD Block, PHC location, beds)
Chinsurah Mogra CD Block: Digsui (10 beds), R.N.Debdas (Naldanga), Bandel (6 beds)
Bansberia Municipality: Bansberia (5 beds)
Balagarh CD Block: Bakulia, Bakuliagram (6 beds), Dumurdaha-Nityanadapur, Gopalpur (10 beds), Guptipara (10 beds), Mohipalpur, Bridabanpur (4 beds), Sukharia, Somra (4 beds), Sripur-Bolagarh, Balagarh (10 beds)
Pandua CD Block: B.L.Mukherjee (Boinchigram), Boinchi (10 beds), Itachuna (10 beds), Dwarbasini (4 beds), Ramswarpur-Gopalnagar, Chandpur (10 beds), Haraldaspur, Hatni (10 beds), Jamgram (6 beds).
Polba Dadpur CD Block: Danarpur (10 beds), Makalpur (10 beds), Kamdebpur, Sugandha (4 beds).
Dhaniakhali CD Block: Bhandarhati (10 beds), Chopa (10 beds), Gurup, Palashi (10 beds), Porabazar (6 beds), Khejurdaha-Milki, Bhastara (10 beds).

Private Hospitals:* (Name, location, beds)
Vivekananda Seva Sadan, Vill & PO Mandra, Dhaniakhali, 25 beds
Jannedra Memorial Child Health Care Hospital, Lions Club, Dhaniakhali, 25 beds
.* Excluding nursing homes

== Electoral constituencies ==
Lok Sabha (parliamentary) and Vidhan Sabha (state assembly) constituencies in Chinsurah subdivision were as follows:

Lok Sabha constituency	Reservation	Vidhan Sabha constituency	Reservation	CD Block and/or Gram panchayats and/or municipal areas
Hooghly	None	Chunchura	None	Hooghly-Chunchura municipality and Bandel, Debanandapur, Kodalia I and Kodalia II gram panchayats of Chinsurah Mogra community development block, and Polba, Rajhat and Sugandha gram panchayats of Polba Dadpur CD Block
-	-	Balagarh	Reserved for SC	Balagarh CD Block and Chandrahati I, Chandrahati II, Digsui and Mogra I GPs of Chinsurah Mogra CD Block
-	-	Pandua	None	Pandua CD Block
-	-	Saptagram	None	Bansberia municipality, Aknna, Amnan, Goswami Malipara, Harit and Mahanad GPs of Polba Dadpur CD Block, and Mogra II and Saptagram gram panchayats of Chinsurah Mogra CD Block
-	-	Dhanekhali	Reserved for SC	Belmuri, Bhastara, Dashghara I, Dashghara II, Dhanekhali I, Dhanekhali II, Gurap, Gurbari I, Gurbari II, Khajurdaha Milki, Mandra, Somaspur I and Somaspur II GPs of Dhaniakhali CD Block, and Babnan, Dadpur, Makalpur and Satithan GPs of Polba-Dadpur CD Block
-	-	Other two assembly segments in Chandannagore subdivision	-	-
