= Polba =

- Village
- Location in West Bengal, India Polba (India)
- Coordinates: 22.9615°N 88.3066°E
- Country: India
- State: West Bengal
- District: Hooghly
- Elevation: 15 m (49 ft)

Population (2011)
  - Total: 6,626

Languages
  - Official: Bengali, English
- Time zone: UTC+5:30 (IST)
- PIN: 712514 (Polba)
- Telephone/STD code: 03213
- Lok Sabha constituency: Hooghly
- Vidhan Sabha constituency: Chunchura
- Website: hooghly.gov.in

Polba is a village in Polba Dadpur CD Block in Chinsurah subdivision of Hooghly district in the state of West Bengal, India.

== Geography ==
Cities and towns in the Chandannagore subdivision and Polba Dadpur and Dhaniakhali CD Blocks of Chinsurah subdivision in Hooghly district
M: municipal corporation/ municipal city/ town, CT: census town, R: rural/ urban centre,
Owing to space constraints in the small map, the actual locations in a larger map may vary slightly

=== Location ===
The area is composed of flat alluvial plains that form a part of the Gangetic Delta.

=== Police station ===
Polba police station has jurisdiction over a part of Polba Dadpur CD Block.

=== Urbanisation ===
In the Chandannagore subdivision, 58.52% of the population is rural and the urban population is 41.48%. Chandannagore subdivision has 1 municipal corporation, 3 municipalities and 7 census towns. The single municipal corporation is Chandernagore Municipal Corporation. The municipalities are Tarakeswar Municipality, Bhadreswar Municipality and Champdany Municipality. Of the three CD Blocks in the Chandannagore subdivision, Tarakeswar CD Block is wholly rural, Haripal CD Block is predominantly rural with just 1 census town, and Singur CD Block is slightly less rural with 6 census towns. Polba Dadpur and Dhaniakhali CD Blocks of Chinsurah subdivision (included in the map alongside) are wholly rural. The municipal areas are Industrialized. All places marked in the map are linked in the larger full screen map.

== Demographics ==
As per the 2011 Census of India, Polba had a total population of 6,626 of which 3,333 (50%) were males and 3,293 (50%) were females. Population below 6 years was 628. The total number of literates in Polba was 4,643 (77.41% of the population over 6 years).

== Transport ==
Polba is on Pandua-Bandel Road. Mogra-Polba Road and Polba-Alinagar Road also meet at Polba.

== Education ==
Polba Mahavidyalaya, a general degree college, was established at Polba in 2005. It is affiliated with the University of Burdwan and offers honors courses in Bengali, English, Sanskrit, history and philosophy.

== Healthcare ==
There is a rural hospital (with 30 beds) at Polba.
