= Polba Dadpur =

- Community development block
- Interactive map of Polba Dadpur
- Coordinates: 22.96°N 88.30°E
- Country: India
- State: West Bengal
- District: Hooghly

Government
  - Type: Representative democracy

Area
  - Total: 285.69 km^{2} (110.31 sq mi)
- Elevation: 15 m (49 ft)

Population (2011)
  - Total: 263,555
  - Density: 922.52/km^{2} (2,389.3/sq mi)

Languages
  - Official: Bengali, English
- Time zone: UTC+5:30 (IST)
- PIN: 712305 (Puinan); 712154 (Polba)
- Area code: 03213
- Vehicle registration: WB-15, WB-16, WB-18
- Literacy: 75.14%
- Lok Sabha constituency: Hooghly
- Vidhan Sabha constituency: Dhanekhali, Saptagram, Chunchura
- Website: hooghly.gov.in

Polba Dadpur is a community development block that forms an administrative division in Chinsurah subdivision of Hooghly district in the Indian state of West Bengal.

== Overview ==
The Polba Dadpur CD Block is part of the Hooghly-Damodar Plain, one of the three natural regions in the district of the flat alluvial plains that forms part of the Gangetic Delta. The region has many depressions which receive water from the surrounding lands during the rainy season and discharge the water through small channels.

== Geography ==
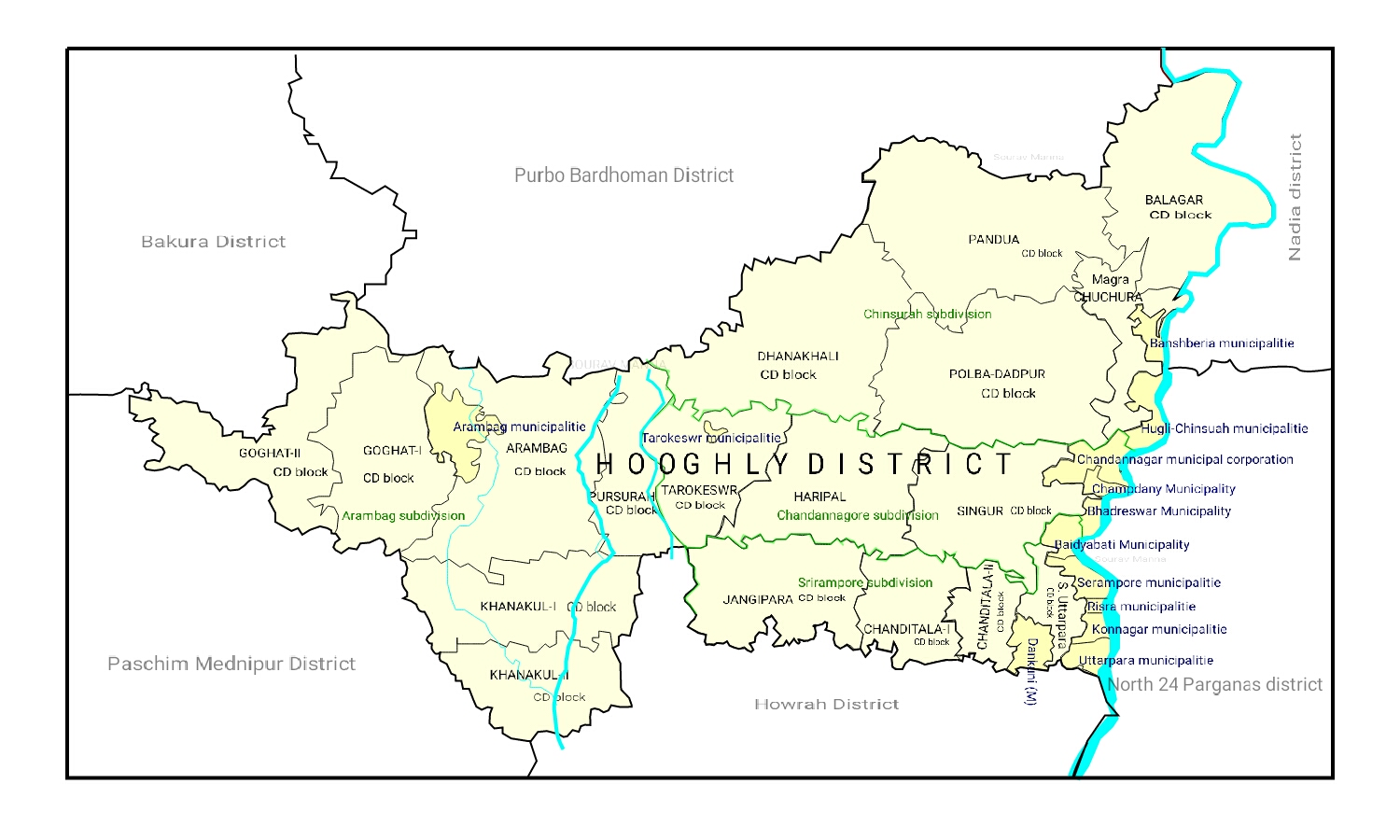
Map of Hooghly district showing CD blocks and municipal areas

Polba is located at 22°58′N 88°18′E.

Polba Dadpur CD Block is bounded by Pandua CD Block, in the north, Chinsurah Mogra and Sreerampur Uttarpara CD Blocks in the east, Singur and Haripal CD Blocks in the south and Dhaniakhali CD Block in the west.

Map of Polba-Dadpur CD block sowing GP areas

It is located 12 km from Chinsurah, the district headquarters.

Polba Dadpur CD Block has an area of 285.69 km^{2}. It has 1 panchayat samity, 12 gram panchayats, 211 gram sansads (village councils), 194 mouzas and 193 inhabited villages. Polba and Dadpur police stations serve this block. Headquarters of this CD Block is at Barun Napara.

Gram panchayats of Polba-Dadpur block/ panchayat samiti are: Akna, Amnan, Babnan, Dadpur, Goswami-Malipara, Harit, Mahanad, Makhalpur, Polba, Rajhat, Sathithan, and Sugandhya.

== Demographics ==
=== Population ===
As per the 2011 Census of India, Polba Dadpur CD Block had a total population of 263,555, all of which were rural. There were 133,678 (51%) males and 129,877 (49%) females. Population below 6 years was 25,953. Scheduled Castes numbered 94,320 (35.79%) and Scheduled Tribes numbered 30,240 (11.47%).

As per the 2001 census, Polba-Dadpur block had a total population of 239,467, out of which 121,193 were males and 118,274 were females. Polba-Dadpur block registered a population growth of 16.32 per cent during the 1991-2001 decade. Decadal growth for Hooghly district was 15.72 per cent. Decadal growth in West Bengal was 17.84 per cent.

Large villages (with 4,000+ population) in Polba Dadpur CD Block are (2011 census figures in brackets): Paunan (5,003), Polba (6,626), Patna Bhairabpur (4,404), Keshwara (4,608), Gotu (4,021), Puinan (4,449), Uttarbabnan (5,135), Harit (4,170) and Talchinan Sanihati (4,801).

Other villages in Polba Dadpur CD Block include (2011 census figures in brackets): Akna (2,408), Rajhat (2,728), Amnan (2,282), Barun Napara (1,628), Satithan (2,142), Dakshin Dadpur (1,319), Uttar Dadpur (1,554) and Sugandha (2,250),

=== Literacy ===
As per the 2011 census the total number of literates in Polba Dadpur CD Block was 178,535 (75.14% of the population over 6 years) out of which males numbered 981.39 (81.57% of the male population over 6 years) and females numbered 80,396 (68.55% of the female population over 6 years). The gender disparity (the difference between female and male literacy rates) was 13.02%.

As per the 2001 census, Polba-Dadpur block had a total literacy of 48.58 per cent. While male literacy was 68.13 per cent, female literacy was 57.45 per cent.

See also – List of West Bengal districts ranked by literacy rate

Literacy in CD blocks of
Hooghly district
Arambagh subdivision
Arambagh – 79.10
Khanakul I – 77.73
Khanakul II – 79.16
Goghat I – 78.70
Goghat II – 77.24
Pursurah – 82.12
Chandannagar subdivision
Haripal – 78.59
Singur – 84.01
Tarakeswar – 79.96
Chinsurah subdivision
Balagarh – 76.94
Chinsurah Mogra – 83.01
Dhaniakhali – 75.66
Pandua – 75.86
Polba Dadpur – 75.14
Srirampore subdivision
Chanditala I – 83.76
Chanditala II – 84.78
Jangipara – 75.34
Sreerampur Uttarpara – 87.33
Source: 2011 Census: CD Block Wise
Primary Census Abstract Data

=== Language and religion ===
Religion in Polba-Dadpur CD block (2011)
Hinduism	77.93%
Islam	19.29%
Other (tribal religion)	2.28%
Other or not stated	0.50%

As per the 2011 census, majority of the population of the district belong to the Hindu community with a population share of 82.9% followed by Muslims at 15.8%. The percentage of the Hindu population of the district has followed a decreasing trend from 87.1% in 1961 to 82.9% in the latest census 2011. On the other hand, the percentage of Muslim population has increased from 12.7% in 1961 to 15.8% in 2011 census.

In the 2011 census Hindus numbered 205,399 and formed 77.93% of the population in Polba Dadpur CD Block. Muslims numbered 50,846 and formed 19.29% of the population. Others numbered 7,310 and formed 2.78% of the population.

Languages of Polba-Dadpur CD block (2011)
1. Bengali (91.5%)
2. Santali (6.59%)
3. Hindi (1.66%)
4. Others (0.20%)

At the time of the 2011 census, 91.55% of the population spoke Bengali, 6.59% Santali and 1.66% Hindi as their first language.

== Rural poverty ==
As per poverty estimates obtained from household survey for families living below poverty line in 2005, rural poverty in Polba Dadpur CD Block was 28.54%.

== Economy ==
=== Livelihood ===
Livelihood
in Polba Dadpur CD Block
1. Cultivators (17.8%)
2. Agricultural labourers (54.9%)
3. Household industries (4.24%)
4. Other Workers (23.1%)

In Polba Dadpur CD Block in 2011, amongst the class of total workers, cultivators formed 17.76%, agricultural labourers 54.89%, household industry workers 4.24% and other workers 23.10%.

=== Infrastructure ===
There are 193 inhabited villages in Polba Dadpur CD Block. 100% villages have power supply. 102 villages have more than one source of drinking water (tap, well, tube well, hand pump), 53 villages have only tube well/ borewell and 38 villages have only hand pump. 18 Villages have post offices, 19 villages have sub post offices and 6 villages have post and telegraph offices. 163 villages have landlines, 110 villages have public call offices and 155 villages have mobile phone coverage. 84 villages have pucca roads and 67 villages have bus service (public/ private). 31 villages have agricultural credit societies, 26 villages have commercial/ co-operative banks and 2 villages have bank ATMs.

=== Agriculture ===
This is a rich agricultural area with several cold storages. Though rice is the prime crop of the district, the agricultural economy largely depends on potato, jute, vegetables, and orchard products. Vegetable is a prize crop in the blocks of Haripal, Singur, Chanditala, Polba and Dhaniakhali being grown in a relay system throughout the year. Though potato is cultivated in all the blocks of this district Dhaniakhali, Arambagh, Goghat, Pursurah, Haripal, Polba-Dadpur, Tarakeswar, Pandua and Singur contributed much of its production of this district.

Some of the primary and other hats or markets in the Polba Dadpur block area are at: Balagar Sripur, Halusai, Harit, Kashwara, Mahansi, Polba, Ramnathpur and Gotu.

Important Handicrafts of Hooghly District
- Zari Work on Sari - Pandua, Pursurah, Jangipara, Tarakeswar and other blocks - 3,000 families involved
- Chikon Embroidery – Babnan, Pandua, Singur - 2,500 families involved
- Silk and Cotton Printing – Serampore (Chanditala) - 300 families involved
- Brass and Bell Metal – Manikpat, Goghat, Arambagh - 150 families involved
- Conch Shell – Pandua, Khanakul, Makla, Chandannagar
- Jute Diversified Product – Baidyabati, Mogra
- Terracota – Chinsurah, Chandannagar, Baidyabati, Mogra

Source:District Human Development Report 2010: Hooghly P. 67

The Tebhaga movement launched in 1946, in 24 Parganas district, aimed at securing for the share-croppers a better position within the existing land relation structure. Although the subsequent Bargadari Act of 1950 recognised the rights of bargadars to a higher share of crops from the land that they tilled, it was not implemented fully. Large tracts, beyond the prescribed limit of land ceiling, remained with the rich landlords. From 1977 onwards major land reforms took place in West Bengal. Land in excess of land ceiling was acquired and distributed amongst the peasants. Following land reforms land ownership pattern has undergone transformation. In 2013-14, persons engaged in agriculture in Polba Dadpur CD Block could be classified as follows: bargadars 8.11%, patta (document) holders 7.58%, small farmers (possessing land between 1 and 2 hectares) 3.02%, marginal farmers (possessing land up to 1 hectare) 15.88% and agricultural labourers 65.41%.

Polba Dadpur CD Block had 146 fertiliser depots, 54 seed stores and 61 fair price shops in 2013-14.

In 2013-14, Polba Dadpur CD Block produced 47,181 tonnes of Aman paddy, the main winter crop from 17,460 hectares, 14,718 tonnes of Boro paddy (spring crop) from 6,905 hectares, 658 tonnes of Aus paddy (summer crop) from 266 hectares, 4,719 tonnes of jute from 307 hectares, 262,084 tonnes of potatoes from 10,366 hectares. It also produced oilseeds and sugar cane.

In 2013-14, the total area irrigated in Polba Dadpur CD Block was 17,486 hectares, out of which 4,710 hectares were irrigated by canal water, 1,510 hectares by tank water, 1,000 hectares by river lift irrigation, 2,120 hectares by deep tube wells and 8,146 hectares by shallow tube wells.

=== Banking ===
In 2013-14, Polba Dadpur CD Block had offices of 12 commercial banks and 3 gramin banks.

== Transport ==
Polba Dadpur CD Block has 7 originating/ terminating bus routes.

The Kolkata-Delhi NH 19/ Durgapur Expressway passes through this CD Block.

== Education ==
In 2013-14, Polba Dadpur CD Block had 171 primary schools with 14,920 students, 13 middle schools with 1,333 students, 19 high schools with 10,238 students and 14 higher secondary schools with 12,716 students. Polba Dadpur CD Block had 1 general college with 630 students and 412 institutions for special and non-formal education with 8,502 students

Polba Mahavidyalaya, a general degree college, was established at Polba in 2005.

Bengal School of Technology was established in 2006 at Sugandha. It offers undergraduate and post graduate courses in pharmacy.

In Polba Dadpur CD Block, amongst the 193 inhabited villages, 25 villages had no school, 49 villages had more than 1 primary school, 122 villages had at least 1 primary school, 46 villages had at least 1 primary and 1 middle school and 33 villages had at least 1 middle and 1 secondary school.

== Healthcare ==
In 2014, Polba Dadpur CD Block had 1 block primary health centre and 3 primary health centres with total 30 beds and 6 doctors (excluding private bodies). It had 45 family welfare subcentres. 2,607 patients were treated indoor and 270,057 patients were treated outdoor in the hospitals, health centres and subcentres of the CD Block.

Polba Dadpur CD Block has Bandel Railway Hospital (with 4 beds) at PO Bandel, Polba Rural Hospital (with 30 beds) at Polba, Danarpur Primary Health Centre (with 10 beds), Makalpur PHC (with 10 beds) and Kamdebpur PHC at PO Sugandha (with 4 beds).

Polba Dadpur CD Block is one of the areas of Hooghly district where ground water is affected by moderate level of arsenic contamination. The WHO guideline for arsenic in drinking water is 10 mg/ litre, and the Indian Standard value is 50 mg/ litre. In Hooghly district, 16 blocks have arsenic levels above WHO guidelines and 11 blocks above Indian standard value. The maximum concentration in Polba Dadpur CD Block is 142 mg/litre.

== See also ==
- Polba (Vidhan Sabha constituency)
