= Gurap =

- Village
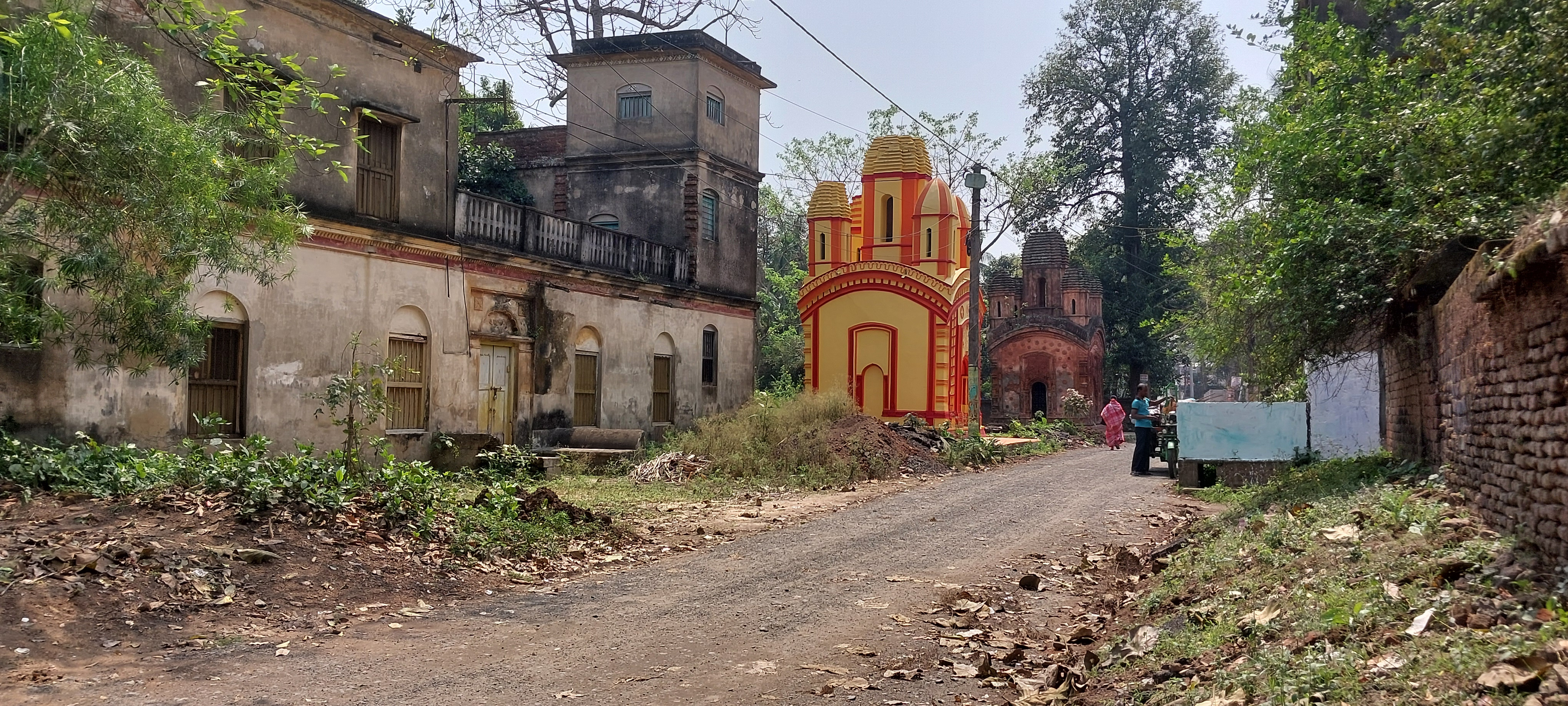

- Location in West Bengal, India Gurap (India)
- Coordinates: 23.037144°N 88.121556°E
- Country: India
- State: West Bengal
- District: Hooghly
- Elevation: 16 m (52 ft)

Population (2011)
  - Total: 7,856

Languages
  - Official: Bengali, English
- Time zone: UTC+5:30 (IST)
- PIN: 712303 (Gurap)
- Telephone/STD code: 03213
- Lok Sabha constituency: Hooghly
- Vidhan Sabha constituency: Dhanekhali
- Website: hooghly.gov.in

Gurap is a village in Dhaniakhali CD block in Chinsurah subdivision of Hooghly district in the state of West Bengal, India.

== Geography ==
Cities and towns in the Chandannagore subdivision and Polba Dadpur and Dhaniakhali CD Blocks of Chinsurah subdivision in Hooghly district
M: municipal corporation/ municipal city/ town, CT: census town, R: rural/ urban centre,
Owing to space constraints in the small map, the actual locations in a larger map may vary slightly

=== Location ===
The area is composed of flat alluvial plains that form a part of the Gangetic Delta.

=== Police station ===
Gurap police station has jurisdiction over a part of Dhaniakhali CD block.

=== Urbanisation ===
In Chandannagore subdivision 58.52% of the population is rural and the urban population is 41.48%. Chandannagore subdivision has 1 municipal corporation, 3 municipalities and 7 census towns. The single municipal corporation is Chandernagore Municipal Corporation. The municipalities are Tarakeswar Municipality, Bhadreswar Municipality and Champdany Municipality. Of the three CD Blocks in Chandannagore subdivision, Tarakeswar CD Block is wholly rural, Haripal CD Block is predominantly rural with just 1 census town, and Singur CD Block is slightly less rural with 6 census towns. Polba Dadpur and Dhaniakhali CD Blocks of Chinsurah subdivision (included in the map alongside) are wholly rural. The municipal areas are industrialised. All places marked in the map are linked in the larger full screen map.

== Demographics ==
As per the 2011 Census of India, Gurap had a total population of 7,856 of which 3,880 (49%) were males and 3,976 (51%) were females. Population below 6 years was 748. The total number of literates in Gurap was 5,126 (72.12% of the population over 6 years).

== Transport ==
Gurap railway station is situated on the Howrah-Bardhaman chord.

The Kolkata-Agra National Highway 19/Durgapur Expressway passes through Gurap.

== Culture ==
David J. McCutchion mentions the Nandadulala temple (1751) at Gurap as a standard atchala temple with porch on triple archway having leafy swathes. He mentions the dol-mancha (18th century) near the Nandadulala temple as having rich terracotta. There are porches on neo classical pillars later attached to the atchala.

The temple of Nandadulala at Gurap (at Sr No S-WB-63) is included in the List of State Protected Monuments in West Bengal by the Archaeological Survey of India.

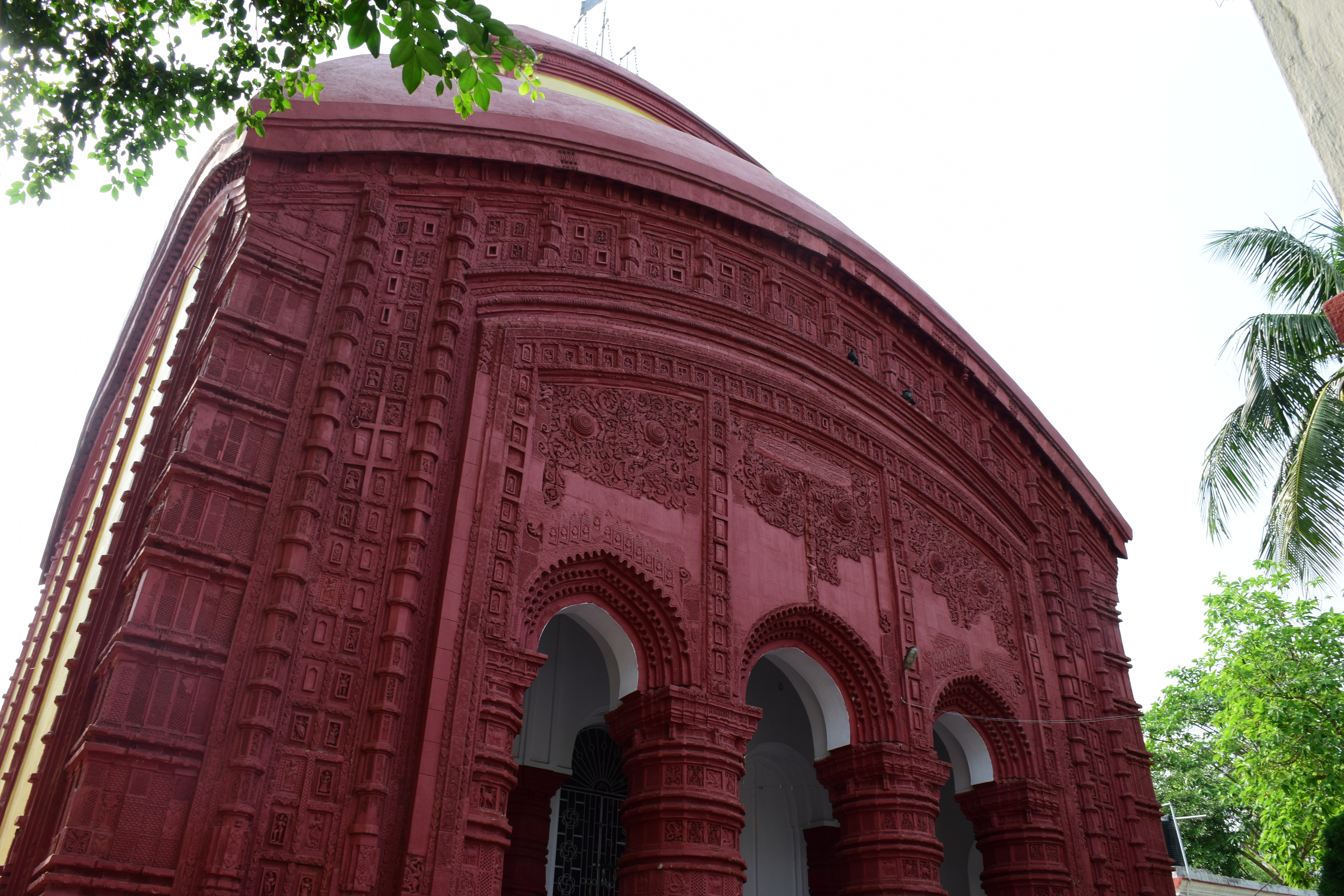
Nandadulala temple

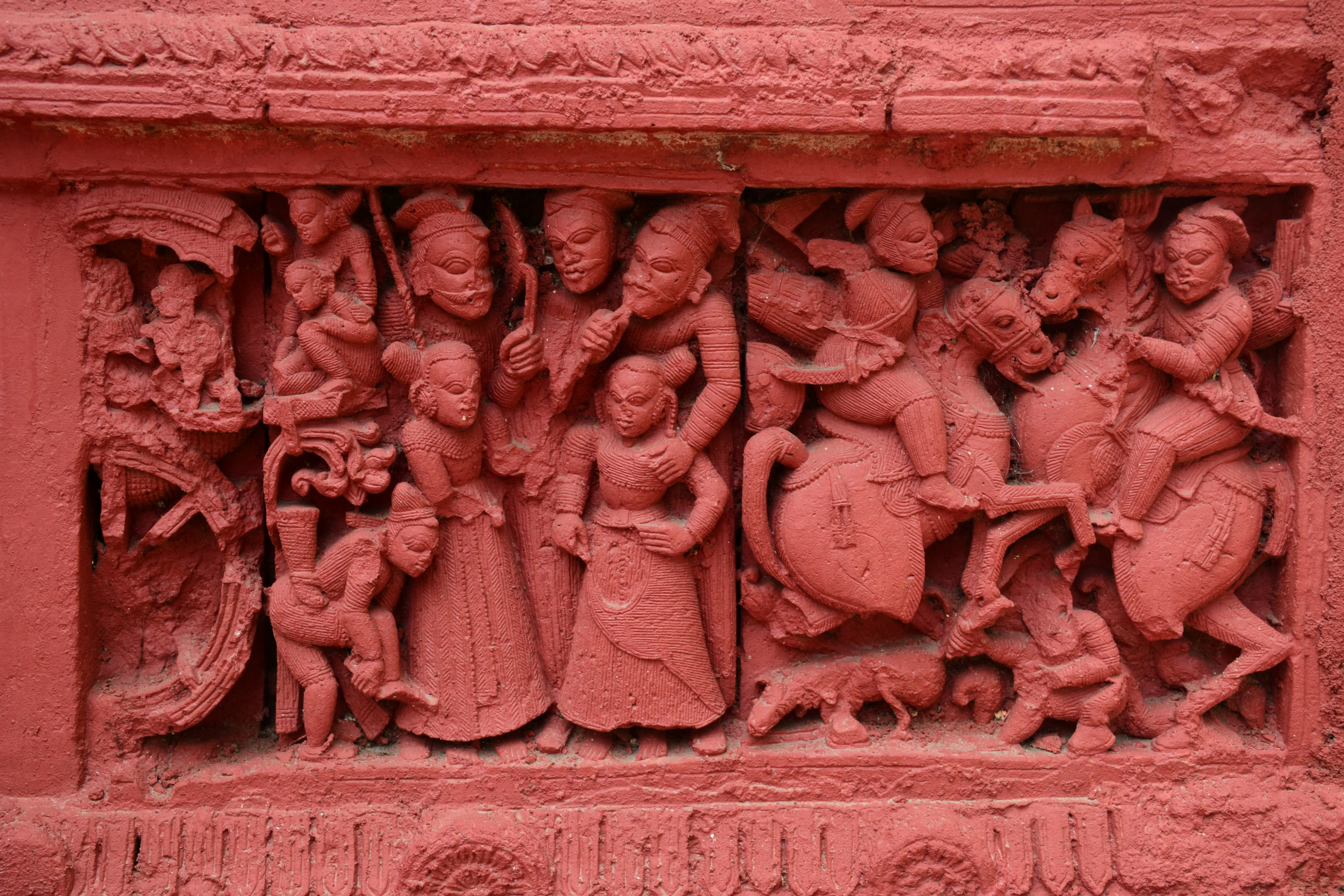
Terracota decoration on the wall of Nanadulala temple

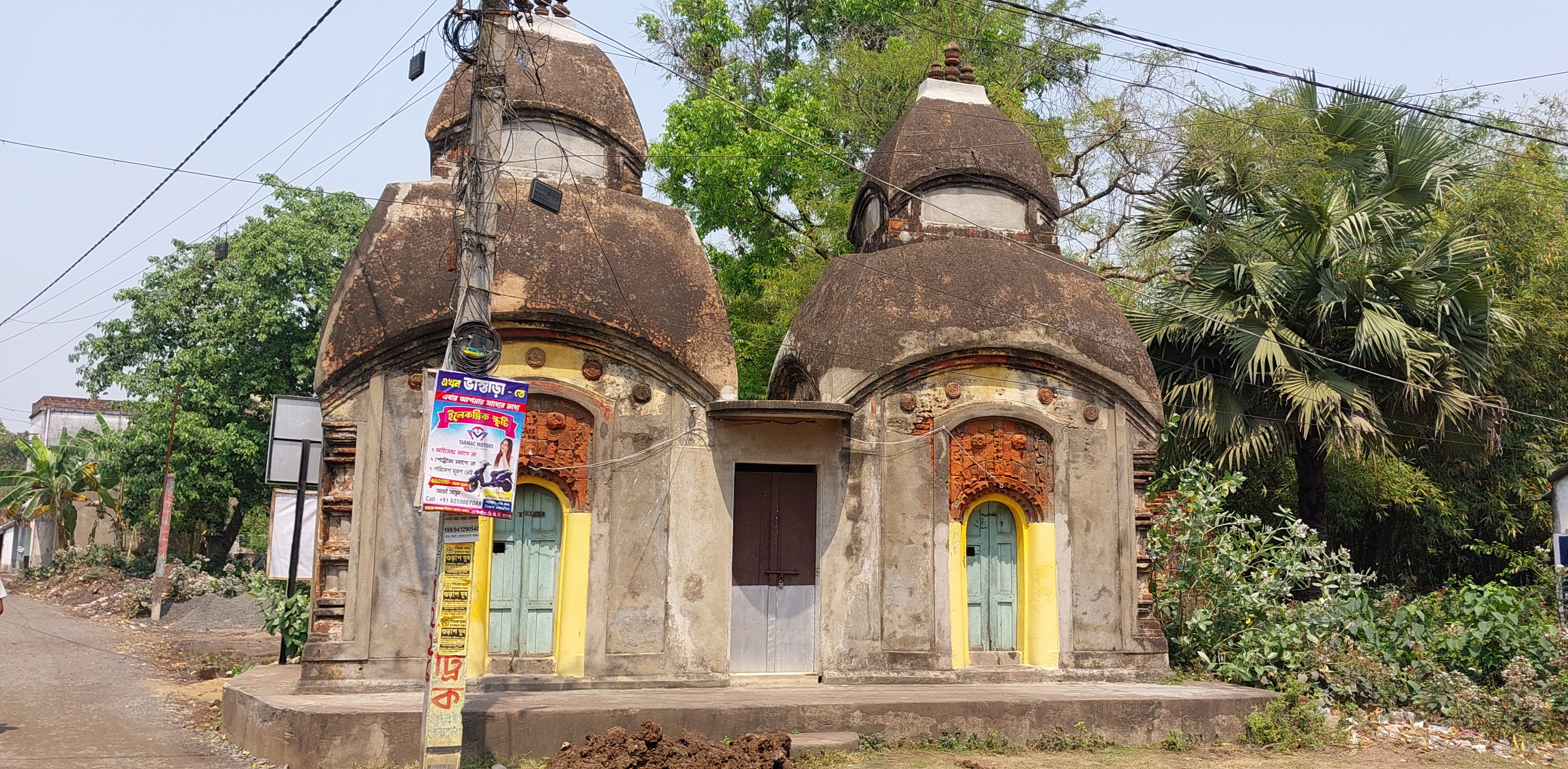
Jora Shiva Temple

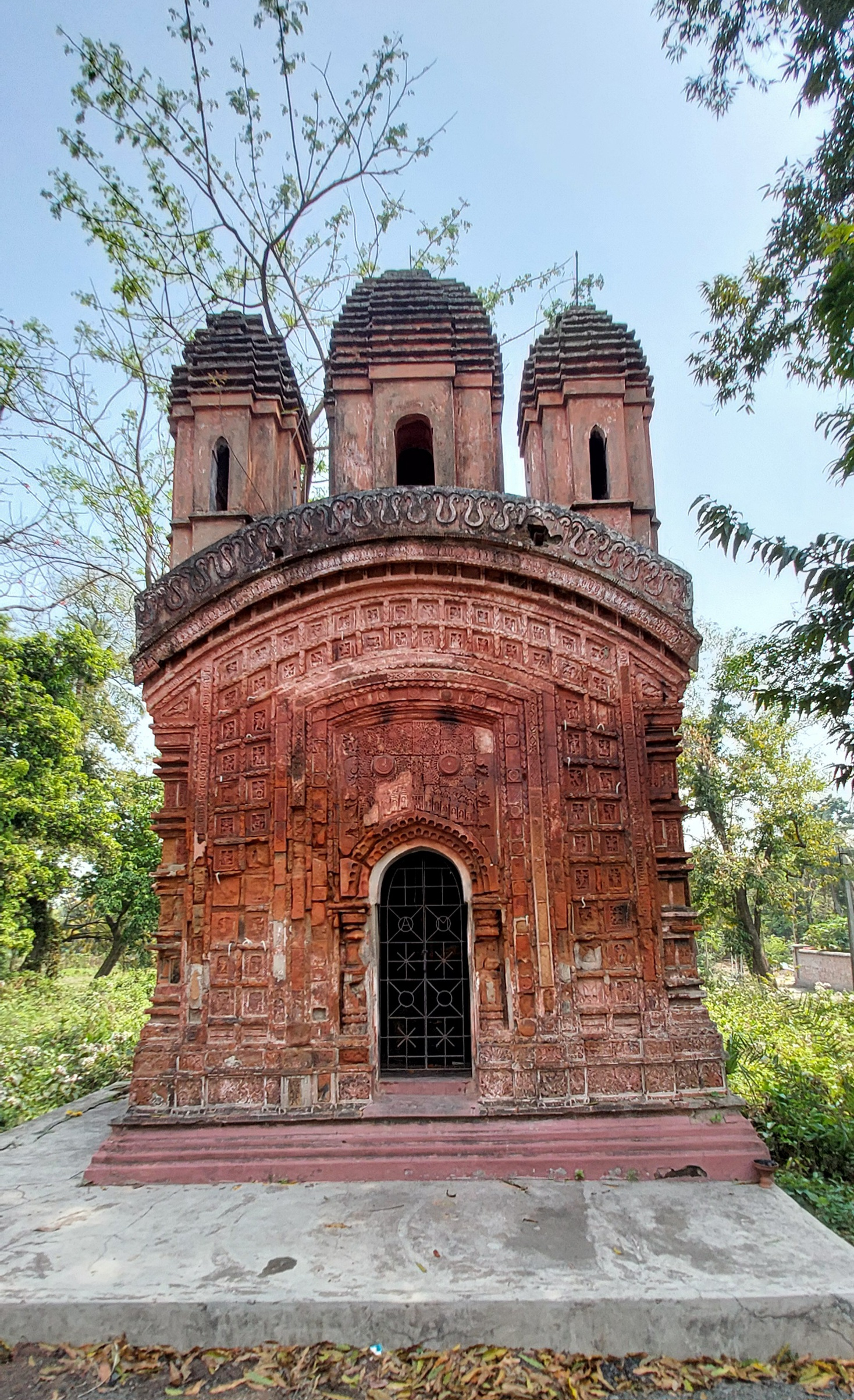
Pancharatna Shiva Temple
