= Dhaniakhali saree =

Traditional Indian garment

Production area

Details
- Origin Place: Dhaniakhali, Hooghly, West Bengal
- Ingredients: Cotton
- Length: 6 m.
- Colour: Traditionally Grey
- Style: Bengal Tradition
- Borders: 1.5 inch to 2 inch
- Usage: Normal day life and Festival

Status
- GI Status: Registered
- Application No.: 176

Dhaniakhali saree (Bengali: ধনিয়াখালি শাড়ি) is a cotton saree made in Dhaniakhali, West Bengal, India. It is a saree with 100 by 100 cotton thread count, borders between 1.5 and 2 inches and six metre long drape.

== See also ==
- Ilkal saree
- Navalgund Durries
