= Dhaniakhali (community development block) =

Community development block in Hooghly, West Bengal

Dhaniakhali Dhonekhali
- Community development block
- Interactive map of Dhaniakhali
- Coordinates: 22.97°N 88.10°E
- Country: India
- State: West Bengal
- District: Hooghly

Government
  - Type: Representative democracy

Area
  - Total: 275.68 km^{2} (106.44 sq mi)
- Elevation: 16 m (52 ft)

Population (2011)
  - Total: 320,534
  - Density: 1,162.7/km^{2} (3,011.4/sq mi)

Languages
  - Official: Bengali, English
- Time zone: UTC+5:30 (IST)
- PIN: 712302 (Dhaniakhali); 712303 (Gurap); 712301 (Bhandarhati)
- Telephone code: +91 3213
- Vehicle registration: WB-15, WB-16, WB-18
- Literacy: 75.66%
- Lok Sabha constituency: Hooghly, Arambag
- Vidhan Sabha constituency: Dhanekhali, Tarakeswar
- Website: hooghly.gov.in

Dhaniakhali (also spelled Dhanekhali) is a community development block that forms an administrative division in Chinsurah subdivision of Hooghly district in the Indian state of West Bengal. The place has lent its name to the tant (handloom) sari it produces.

== Overview ==
The Dhaniakhali CD Block is part of the Hooghly-Damodar Plain, one of the three natural regions in the district of the flat alluvial plains that forms part of the Gangetic Delta. The region has many depressions which receive water from the surrounding lands during the rainy season and discharge the water through small channels.

== Geography ==
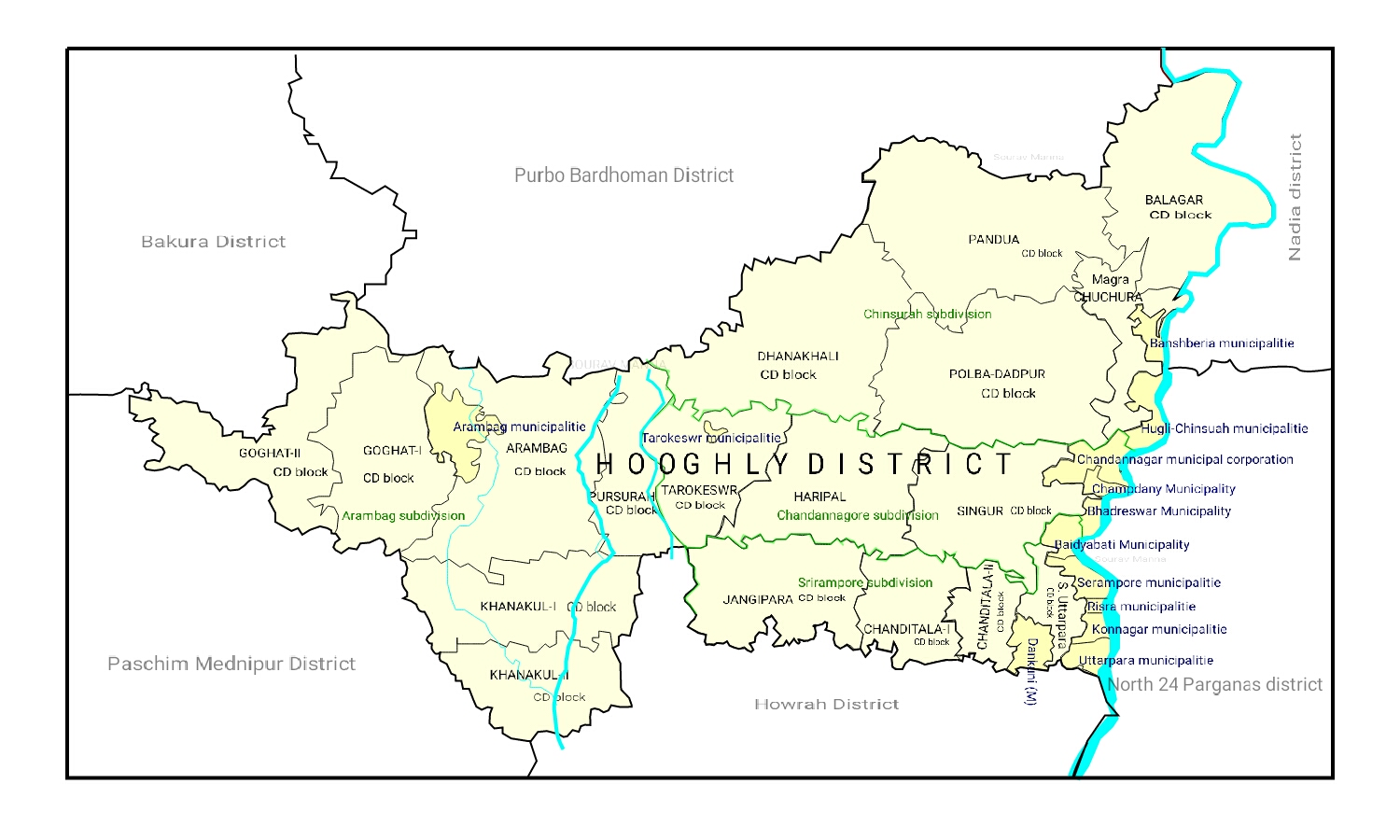
Map of Hooghly district showing CD blocks and municipal areas

Dhanekhali is located at 22°58′N 88°06′E.

Map of Dhaniakhali CD block showing GP areas

Dhaniakhali CD Block is bounded by Pandua CD Block, in a part of the north and a part of the east, Polba Dadpur CD Block in a major portion of the east, Haripal and Tarakeswar CD Blocks, in the south and Pursurah CD Block and Jamalpur CD Block, in Bardhaman district, in the west.

It is located 36 km from Chinsurah, the district headquarters.

Dhaniakhali CD Block has an area of 275.68 km^{2}. It has 1 panchayat samity, 18 gram panchayats, 264 gram sansads (village councils), 214 mouzas and 214 inhabited villages. Dhaniakhali and Gurap police stations serve this block. Headquarters of this CD Block is at Dhaniakhali.

Gram panchayats of Dhaniakhali block/ panchayat samiti are: Belmuri, Bhanderhati I, Bhanderhati II, Bhastara, Dasghara I, Dasghara II, Dhaniakhali I, Dhaniakhali II, Gopinathpur I, Gopinathpur II, Gurap, Gurbari I, Gurbari II, Khajurdaha-Milki, Mandra, Parambua-Sahabazar, Somaspur I and Somaspur II.

== Demographics ==
=== Population ===
As per 2011 Census of India Dhaniakhali CD Block had a total population of 320,534, all of which were rural. There were 160,789 (50%) males and 159,745 (50%) females. Population below 6 years was 31,228. Scheduled Castes numbered 105,811 (33.01%) and Scheduled Tribes numbered 45,715 (14.26%).

As per 2001 census, Dhaniakhali block had a total population of 293,305, out of which 148,265 were males and 145,040 were females. Dhaniakhali block registered a population growth of 13.86 per cent during the 1991-2001 decade. Decadal growth for Hooghly district was 15.72 per cent. Decadal growth in West Bengal was 17.84 per cent.

Large (4,000+ population) villages in Dhaniakhali CD Block (2011 census figures in brackets): Srikrishnapur (10,345), Shrirampur (4,170), Gopinagar (5,424), Mandara (7,610), Bhandarhati (6,928), Samaspur (4,113), Gurap (7,856), Bhastara (5,084) and Cheragram (4,328).

Other villages in Dhaniakhali CD Block include (2011 census figures in brackets): Dhaniakhali (3,738).

=== Literacy ===
As per the 2011 census the total number of literates in Dhaniakhali CD Block was 218,902 (75.66% of the population over 6 years) out of which males numbered 119,539 (82.51% of the male population over 6 years) and females numbered 99,363 (68.79% of the female population over 6 years). The gender disparity (the difference between female and male literacy rates) was 13.72%.

As per the 2001 census, Dhaniakhali block had a total literacy of 48.55 per cent. While male literacy was 68.42 per cent, female literacy was 46.07 per cent.

See also – List of West Bengal districts ranked by literacy rate

Literacy in CD blocks of
Hooghly district
Arambagh subdivision
Arambagh – 79.10
Khanakul I – 77.73
Khanakul II – 79.16
Goghat I – 78.70
Goghat II – 77.24
Pursurah – 82.12
Chandannagar subdivision
Haripal – 78.59
Singur – 84.01
Tarakeswar – 79.96
Chinsurah subdivision
Balagarh – 76.94
Chinsurah Mogra – 83.01
Dhaniakhali – 75.66
Pandua – 75.86
Polba Dadpur – 75.14
Srirampore subdivision
Chanditala I – 83.76
Chanditala II – 84.78
Jangipara – 75.34
Sreerampur Uttarpara – 87.33
Source: 2011 Census: CD Block Wise
Primary Census Abstract Data

=== Language and religion ===
Religion in Dhaniakhali CD block (2011)
Hinduism	80.85%
Islam	16.34%
Other (tribal religion)	2.58%
Other or not stated	0.23%

As per the 2011 census, majority of the population of the district belong to the Hindu community with a population share of 82.9% followed by Muslims at 15.8%. The percentage of the Hindu population of the district has followed a decreasing trend from 87.1% in 1961 to 82.9% in the latest census 2011. On the other hand, the percentage of Muslim population has increased from 12.7% in 1961 to 15.8% in 2011 census.

In 2011 census Hindus numbered 259,152 and formed 80.85% of the population in Dhaniakhali CD Block. Muslims numbered 52,384 and formed 16.34% of the population. Others numbered 8,998 and formed 2.81% of the population.

Languages of Dhaniakhali CD block (2011)
1. Bengali (91.2%)
2. Santali (7.63%)
3. Others (1.21%)

At the time of the 2011 census, 91.16% of the population spoke Bengali and 7.63% Santali as their first language.

== Rural poverty ==
As per poverty estimates obtained from household survey for families living below poverty line in 2005, rural poverty in Dhaniakhali CD Block was 31.85%.

== Economy ==
=== Livelihood ===
Livelihood
in Dhaniakhali CD Block
1. Cultivators (17.5%)
2. Agricultural labourers (53.7%)
3. Household industries (3.80%)
4. Other Workers (25.0%)

In Dhaniakhali CD Block in 2011, amongst the class of total workers, cultivators formed 17.50%, agricultural labourers 53.71%, household industry workers 3.80% and other workers 25.00%.

=== Infrastructure ===
There are 214 inhabited villages in Dhaniakhali CD Block. 100% villages have power supply. 85 villages have more than one source of drinking water (tap, well, tube well, hand pump), 55 villages have only tube well/ borewell and 73 have only hand pump. 19 Villages have post offices, 30 villages have sub post offices and 9 villages have post and telegraph offices. 186 villages have landlines, 113 villages have public call offices and 176 villages have mobile phone coverage. 56 villages have pucca roads and 47 villages have bus service (public/ private). 27 villages have agricultural credit societies, 15 villages have commercial/ co-operative banks and 12 villages have bank ATMs.

=== Agriculture ===
This is a rich agricultural area with several cold storages. Though rice is the prime crop of the district, the agricultural economy largely depends on potato, jute, vegetables, and orchard products. Vegetable is a prize crop in the blocks of Haripal, Singur, Chanditala, Polba and Dhaniakhali being grown in a relay system throughout the year. Though potato is cultivated in all the blocks of this district Dhaniakhali, Arambagh, Goghat, Pursurah, Haripal, Polba-Dadpur, Tarakeswar, Pandua and Singur contributed much of its production of this district.

Some of the primary and other hats or markets in the Dhaniakhali block area are at: Belmuri, Gopinagar, Hazipur, Kananadi, Bhastara, Chowghata, Sahabazar, Dashghara, and Gurap.

Important Handicrafts of Hooghly District
- Zari Work on Sari - Pandua, Pursurah, Jangipara, Tarakeswar and other blocks - 3,000 families involved
- Chikon Embroidery – Babnan, Pandua, Singur - 2,500 families involved
- Silk and Cotton Printing – Serampore (Chanditala) - 300 families involved
- Brass and Bell Metal – Manikpat, Goghat, Arambagh - 150 families involved
- Conch Shell – Pandua, Khanakul, Makla, Chandannagar
- Jute Diversified Product – Baidyabati, Mogra
- Terracota – Chinsurah, Chandannagar, Baidyabati, Mogra

Source:District Human Development Report 2010: Hooghly P. 67

The Tebhaga movement launched in 1946, in 24 Parganas district, aimed at securing for the share-croppers a better position within the existing land relation structure. Although the subsequent Bargadari Act of 1950 recognised the rights of bargadars to a higher share of crops from the land that they tilled, it was not implemented fully. Large tracts, beyond the prescribed limit of land ceiling, remained with the rich landlords. From 1977 onwards major land reforms took place in West Bengal. Land in excess of land ceiling was acquired and distributed amongst the peasants. Following land reforms land ownership pattern has undergone transformation. In 2013-14, persons engaged in agriculture in Dhaniakhali CD Block could be classified as follows: bargadars 8.94%, patta (document) holders 6.64%, small farmers (possessing land between 1 and 2 hectares) 3.46%, marginal farmers (possessing land up to 1 hectare) 21.47% and agricultural labourers 59.49%. Dhaniakhali CD Block had 192 fertiliser depots, 56 seed stores and 63 fair price shops in 2013-14.

In 2013-14, Dhaniakhali CD Block produced 50,670 tonnes of Aman paddy, the main winter crop from 18,893 hectares, 13,300 tonnes of Boro paddy (spring crop) from 4,489 hectares, 84 tonnes of Aus paddy (summer crop) from 34 hectares, 83 tonnes of wheat from 40 hectares, 25,499 tonnes of jute from 1,311 hectares and 95,184 tonnes of potatoes from 5,800 hectares. It also produced oilseeds.

In 2013-14, the total area irrigated in Dhaniakhali CD Block was 24,640 hectares, out of which 17,370 hectares were irrigated by canal water, 3,390 hectares by tank water, 450 hectares by river lift irrigation, 640 hectares by deep tube wells and 2,790 hectares by shallow tube wells.

=== Industry ===
Pailan Group's Ascon Agro has set up a Rs 500 million potato flakes plant at Dhaniakhali. The potato plant, built on 65 acres (260,000 m^{2}), has a capacity of 3,600 tons per annum. The project, with Export Oriented Unit-Special Economic Zone status, used machinery imported from The Netherlands and would employ 1500 people.

=== Textiles ===
According to The Hindu Business Line, "The Bengal cotton sari is a fashion statement, wherever it is worn" and have a market all over the country. The Times of India says that Dhaniakhali, Shantipur and Phulia are well–known for the traditional handloom saris of West Bengal. "In Dhaniakhali block every household has at least one loom. The sari produced here is named after the place". The material for the Dhaniakhali sari is somewhat coarse and heavier than other textiles from Bengal but suits the middle class budget and as such is popular. An ordinary Dhaniakhali sari takes a minimum of two days (10–12 hours each day), to be woven, and the weaver collects Rs. 50 for it. It sells for Rs. 100 in the market. The most exotic ones take four to five days to weave, fetches the weaver Rs. 450, and is sold for Rs. 800.

The weaving of Jamdani saris originated in Dhaka in Bangladesh. Dhakai jamdani was famous among the aristocratic ladies in olden days. Places like Shantipur, Dhaniakhali, Begampur and Farasdanga started producing the jamdani saris, after the partition of India.

In earlier days Dhaniakhali also produced superfine dhotis but has switched over to saris as per changes in market demand. Now, they also want to weave material for salwar-kurtas in order to cater to the needs of the changing market.

The Times of India reports that the weavers of Dhaniakhali have been facing financial problems. More than half are members of a co-operative, Dhaniakhali Union Tant Silpi Samabaya Samity. The rest who operate through mahajans (middlemen or money-lenders) have a tough time. It is not that the saris are not selling, but the trouble is that they are not being paid in time by the state government-run emporia, who are the main buyers. It is difficult to function without cash since the raw material provided by the cooperative to the weavers cannot be bought on credit.

Mamata Banerjee, the West Bengal chief minister, generally wears only Dhaniakhali tant sari and has become a popular 'brand ambassador'.

=== Banking ===
In 2013-14, Dhaniakhali CD Block had offices of 25 commercial banks and 1 gramin bank.

== Transport ==
Dhaniakhali CD Block has 1 ferry service and 5 originating/ terminating bus routes.

The Howrah–Bardhaman chord, a shorter link to Bardhaman from Howrah than the Howrah–Bardhaman main line, was constructed in 1917. There are stations at Belmuri, Dhaniakhali (halt), Sibaichandi, Hajigarh and Gurap .

Dhaniakhali railway station on the Howrah-Bardhaman chord was inaugurated in December 2003. It is 49 kilometres (30 mi) from Howrah Station and is part of the Kolkata Suburban Railway system.

There are two main bus stoppages, Madan Mohan Tala bus stop and Cinematala bus stop. Daily road transportation takes place through numerous bus routes which connect Dhaniakhali with Chinsurah - Tarakeswar - Haripal. It also connects with the Kolkata-Delhi NH 19 (old no. 2) at Maheswarpur, 8 km towards Chinsurah.

The Kolkata-Delhi NH 19/ Durgapur Expressway passes through this CD Block.

== Education ==
In 2013-14, Dhaniakhali CD Block had 199 primary schools with 18,168 students, 19 middle schools with 1,276 students, 19 high schools with 10,938 students and 22 higher secondary schools with 25,681 students. Dhaniakhali CD Block had 1 general college with 1,273 students and 507 institutions for special and non-formal education with 8,927 students

In Dhaniakhali CD Block, amongst the 214 inhabited villages, 34 had no school, 44 had more than 1 primary school, 115 had at least 1 primary school, 65 had at least 1 primary and 1 middle school and 35 had at least 1 middle and 1 secondary school.

Sarat Centenary College was established at Dhaniakhali in 1978.

Dhaniakhali Mahamaya Vidyamandir is one of the best higher secondary schools in that area. It has Science, Arts as well as Commerce stream.

Little magazine-Lipika is one of the oldest little magazines published from Somospur.

== Healthcare ==
In 2014, Dhaniakhali CD Block had 1 rural hospital, 6 primary health centres and 6 private nursing homes with total 77 beds and 12 doctors (excluding private bodies). It had 57 family welfare subcentres. 7,112 patients were treated indoor and 322,441 patients were treated outdoor in the hospitals, health centres and subcentres of the CD Block.

Dhaniakhali CD Block has Dhaniakhali Rural Hospital (with 30 beds) at Dhaniakhali, Bhandarhati Primary Health Centre (with 10 beds), Chopa PHC (with 10 beds), Gurup PHC at PO Palashi (with 10 beds), Porabazar PHC (with 6 beds) and Khejurdaha-Milki PHC at PO Bhastara (with 10 beds).

There is a 30 bed hospital operated by the local Lions Club.

Dhaniakhali CD Block is one of the areas of Hooghly district where ground water is affected by high level of arsenic contamination. The WHO guideline for arsenic in drinking water is 10 mg/ litre, and the Indian Standard value is 50 mg/ litre. In Hooghly district, 16 blocks have arsenic levels above WHO guidelines and 11 blocks above Indian standard value. The maximum concentration in Dhaniakhali CD Block is 225 mg/litre.
