= Dadpur, Hooghly =

Dadpur
- Village
- Location in West Bengal, India Dadpur (India)
- Coordinates: 22.937°N 88.195°E
- Country: India
- State: West Bengal
- District: Hooghly
- Elevation: 15 m (49 ft)

Languages
  - Official: Bengali, English
- Time zone: UTC+5:30 (IST)
- PIN: 712148 (Sultangacha)
- Telephone/STD code: 03213
- Lok Sabha constituency: Hooghly
- Vidhan Sabha constituency: Dhanekhali
- Website: hooghly.gov.in

Dadpur is a village in Polba Dadpur CD Block in Chinsurah subdivision of Hooghly district in the state of West Bengal, India.

== Geography ==
Cities and towns in the Chandannagore subdivision and Polba Dadpur and Dhaniakhali CD Blocks of Chinsurah subdivision in Hooghly district
M: municipal corporation/ municipal city/ town, CT: census town, R: rural/ urban centre,
Owing to space constraints in the small map, the actual locations in a larger map may vary slightly

=== Location ===
Dadpur is located at 22.937°N 88.195°E.

=== Police station ===
Dadpur police station has jurisdiction over part of the Polba Dadpur CD Block.

=== Urbanisation ===
In Chandannagore subdivision 58.52% of the population is rural and the rest is urban. Chandannagore subdivision has 1 municipal corporation, 3 municipalities and 7 census towns. The single municipal corporation is Chandernagore Municipal Corporation. The municipalities are Tarakeswar Municipality, Bhadreswar Municipality and Champdany Municipality. Of the three CD Blocks in Chandannagore subdivision, Tarakeswar CD Block is wholly rural, Haripal CD Block is predominantly rural with just 1 census town, and Singur CD Block is slightly less rural with 6 census towns. Polba Dadpur and Dhaniakhali CD Blocks of Chinsurah subdivision (included in the map alongside) are wholly rural. The municipal areas are industrialised. All places marked in the map are linked in the larger full screen map.

== Demographics ==
As per the 2011 Census of India, Uttar Dadpur had a total population of 1,554 of which 795 (51%) were males and 759 (49%) were females. Population below 6 years was 153. The total number of literates in Uttar Dadpur was 1,194 (85.22% of the population over 6 years).

As per the 2011 Census of India, Dakshin Dadpur had a total population of 1,319 of which 678 (51%) were males and 641 (49%) were females. Population below 6 years was 135. The total number of literates in Dakshin Dadpur was 990 (83.61% of the population over 6 years).

== Transport ==
A short stretch of Chunchura-Dhaniakhali Road links Dadpur to the Kolkata-Delhi NH 19/ Durgapur Expressway passes through Gurap.
