= Sugandha, Hooghly =

Sugandha
- Village
- Location in West Bengal, India Sugandha (India)
- Coordinates: 22.90925°N 88.339769°E
- Country: India
- State: West Bengal
- District: Hooghly
- Elevation: 15 m (49 ft)

Population (2011)
  - Total: 2,250

Languages
  - Official: Bengali, English
- Time zone: UTC+5:30 (IST)
- PIN: 712248 (Rishra)
- Telephone/STD code: 03213
- Lok Sabha constituency: Hooghly
- Vidhan Sabha constituency: Chunchura
- Website: hooghly.gov.in

Sugandha is a village and a gram panchayat in Polba Dadpur CD Block in Chinsurah subdivision of Hooghly district in the state of West Bengal, India.

== Demographics ==
At the 2011 Census of India, Sugandha had a total population of 2,250 of which 1,104 (49%) were males and 1,146 (51%) were females. The population below 6 years of age was 169. The total number of literates in Sugandha was 1,828 (87.84% of the population over 6 years).

== Transport ==
Sugandha stands at the crossing of State Highway 13 (West Bengal) (also known as Delhi Road in the area) and Chunchura-Dhaniakhali Road.

It is 4 km from Chuchura railway station.

== Education ==
Bengal School of Technology was established in 2006 at Sugandha. It offers undergraduate and post graduate courses in pharmacy.
