= Barun Napara =

Barunanpara
- Village
- Location in West Bengal, India Barunanpara (India)
- Coordinates: 22.9345°N 88.3026°E
- Country: India
- State: West Bengal
- District: Hooghly
- Elevation: 15 m (49 ft)

Population (2011)
  - Total: 1,628

Languages
  - Official: Bengali, English
- Time zone: UTC+5:30 (IST)
- PIN: 712148 (Polba)
- Telephone/STD code: 03213
- Lok Sabha constituency: Hooghly
- Vidhan Sabha constituency: Chunchura
- Website: hooghly.gov.in

Barunanpara is a village in Polba Dadpur CD Block in Chinsurah subdivision of Hooghly district in the state of West Bengal, India.

== Geography ==
Cities and towns in the Chandannagore subdivision and Polba Dadpur and Dhaniakhali CD Blocks of Chinsurah subdivision in Hooghly district
M: municipal corporation/ municipal city/ town, CT: census town, R: rural/ urban centre,
Owing to space constraints in the small map, the actual locations in a larger map may vary slightly

=== Location ===
The area is composed of flat alluvial plains that form a part of the Gangetic Delta.

=== CD Block HQ ===
The headquarters of Polba Dadpur CD Block are located at Barun Napara.

=== Urbanisation ===
In Chandannagore subdivision, 58.52% of the population is rural and the rest urban. Chandannagore subdivision has 1 municipal corporation, 3 municipalities and 7 census towns. The single municipal corporation is Chandernagore Municipal Corporation. The municipalities are Tarakeswar Municipality, Bhadreswar Municipality and Champdany Municipality. Of the three CD Blocks in Chandannagore subdivision, Tarakeswar CD Block is wholly rural, Haripal CD Block is predominantly rural with just 1 census town, and Singur CD Block is slightly less rural with 6 census towns. Polba Dadpur and Dhaniakhali CD Blocks of Chinsurah subdivision (included in the map alongside) are wholly rural. The municipal areas are industrialised. All places marked in the map are linked in the larger full screen map.

== Demographics ==
As per the 2011 Census of India, Barunanpara had a total population of 1,628 of which 818 (50%) were males and 810 (50%) were females. Population below 6 years was 153. The total number of literates in Barunanpara was 1,261 (85.49% of the population over 6 years).

== Transport ==
Barunanpara is on Polba-Alinagar Road.
