= Bansberia Municipality =

Type
- Type: Municipality

History
- Founded: 1869; 157 years ago

Leadership
- Chairman: Vacant
- Vice Chairperson: Vacant

Structure
- Seats: 22
- Political groups: Government (21): AITC (21); Opposition (1): CPI(M) (1)

Elections
- Last election: 2022
- Next election: 2027

Website
- www.bansberiamunicipality.org

Bansberia Municipality is the civic body that governs Bansberia and its surrounding areas (Tribeni) in Chinsurah subdivision of Hooghly district, West Bengal, India.

== History ==
Bansberia Municipality was established in 1869.

== Geography ==
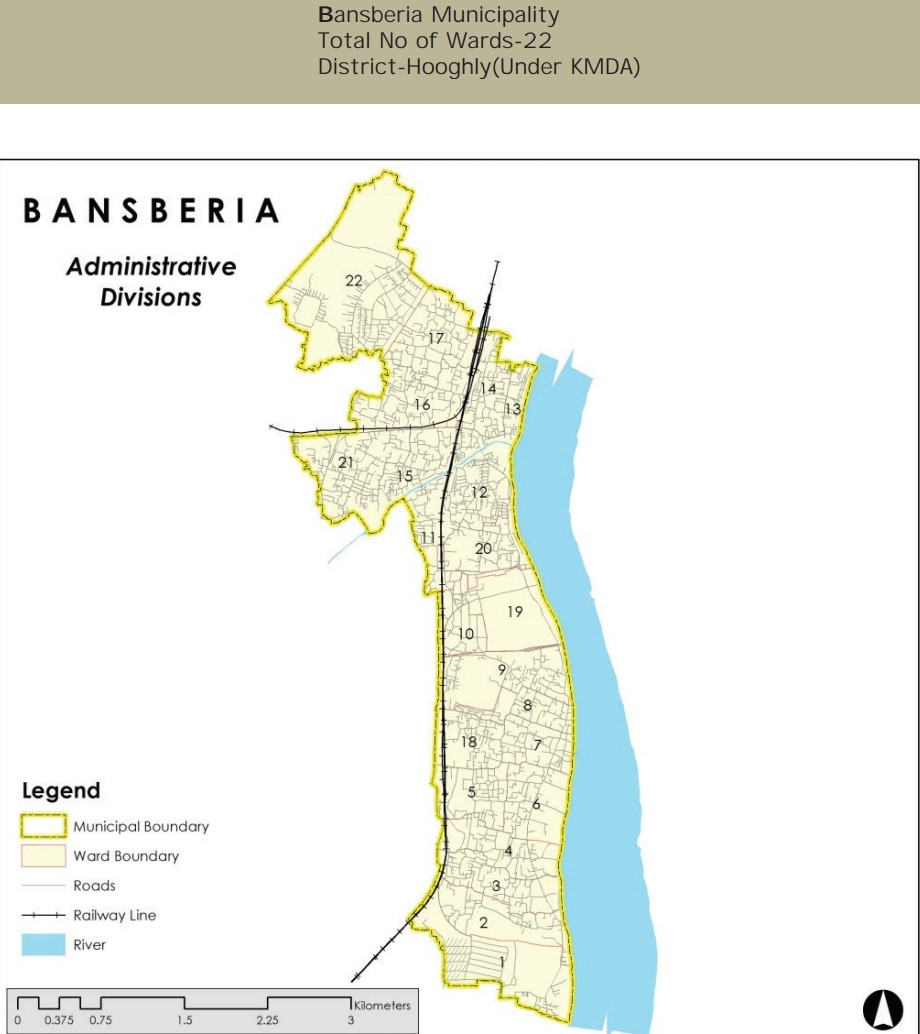
Map of Bansberia Municipality

Bansberia Municipality covers an area of 9.072 sq km and has a total population of 103,799 (2011).

In 1981, 32.39% of the total population formed main workers and 67.61% were non-workers in Bansberia Municipality and 57.97% of the total main workers were industrial workers. This may be interpreted as follows: although industrial activities are prominent in the municipal areas of the region, the major portion of the population is commuters and migrants find employment in the area.

== Healthcare ==
Bandel Thermal Power Station Hospital, with 10 beds, and a primary health centre with 5 beds are located in the Bansberia Municipality area.

== Elections ==
In the 2015 municipal elections for Bansberia Municipality Trinamool Congress won 17 seats, CPI (M) 1 seat, Forward Bloc 1 seat, BJP 1 seats and Independents 2 seats.

In the 2010 municipal elections for Bansberia Municipality Trinamool Congress won 17 seats, CPI (M) 2 seats, Forward Bloc 1 seat and Congress 2 seats.

About the 2010 municipal elections, The Guardian wrote, "Today's municipal elections are unlike any for decades: the Communists, who have held West Bengal's main towns almost without a break since the 1970s, are facing disaster… This time defeat is likely to be definitive and could signal the beginning of the end for the Communist Party of India-Marxist (CPIM)."

In the 2005 municipal elections for Bansberia Municipality, CPI (M) won 14 seats, Forward Bloc 1 seat, Congress 5 seats, Trinamool Congress 1 seat and others 1 seat.
