= Hooghly Chinsurah Municipality =

Municipal Corporation in West Bengal

Type
- Type: Municipality

History
- Founded: 1865; 161 years ago

Leadership
- Chairman: Vacant
- Vice Chairman: Vacant

Structure
- Seats: 30
- Political groups: Government (29): AITC (29); Opposition (1): CPI(M) (1)

Elections
- Last election: 2022
- Next election: 2027

Website
- www.hcm.net.in

Hooghly Chinsurah Municipality is the civic body that governs Hugli-Chuchura and its surrounding areas (Bandel) in Chinsurah subdivision of Hooghly district, West Bengal, India.

== History ==
Hooghly Chinsurah Municipality was established in 1865. It was formed by the amalgamation of the Hooghly and Chinsurah towns, primarily with the objective of local governance and tax collection. Cockrell was its first Chairman and G.S. Park its first Vice Chairman. Brajendranath De, ICS, was its first Indian Chairman.

As the ancient port city of Satgaon declined, Hooghly was founded by the Portuguese in 1537. It was later acquired by the British. Chinsurah was developed as a Dutch settlement in the 17th century. It passed into British hands in exchange for their possessions in Sumatra.

=== Notable residents ===
- Hazi Md Mahashin
- Bhudev Mukherjee
- Ramgati Nayaratna
- Kaji Nazrul Islam
- Joytish Ch Ghosh
- Gopesh Chandra Mallick (Freedom Fighter)
- Bijoy Modak
- U.L. Brahmachari (Scientist)
- Sambhunath Dey
- Narayan Ch Ghosh (Mathematician)
- Manoranjan Porel (Athlete)
- Dr. Murari Mukherjee
- Akshay Chandra Sarkar
- Ganga charan sarkar
- Dinanath dhar
- Bankim Chandra Chatterjee

== Geography ==
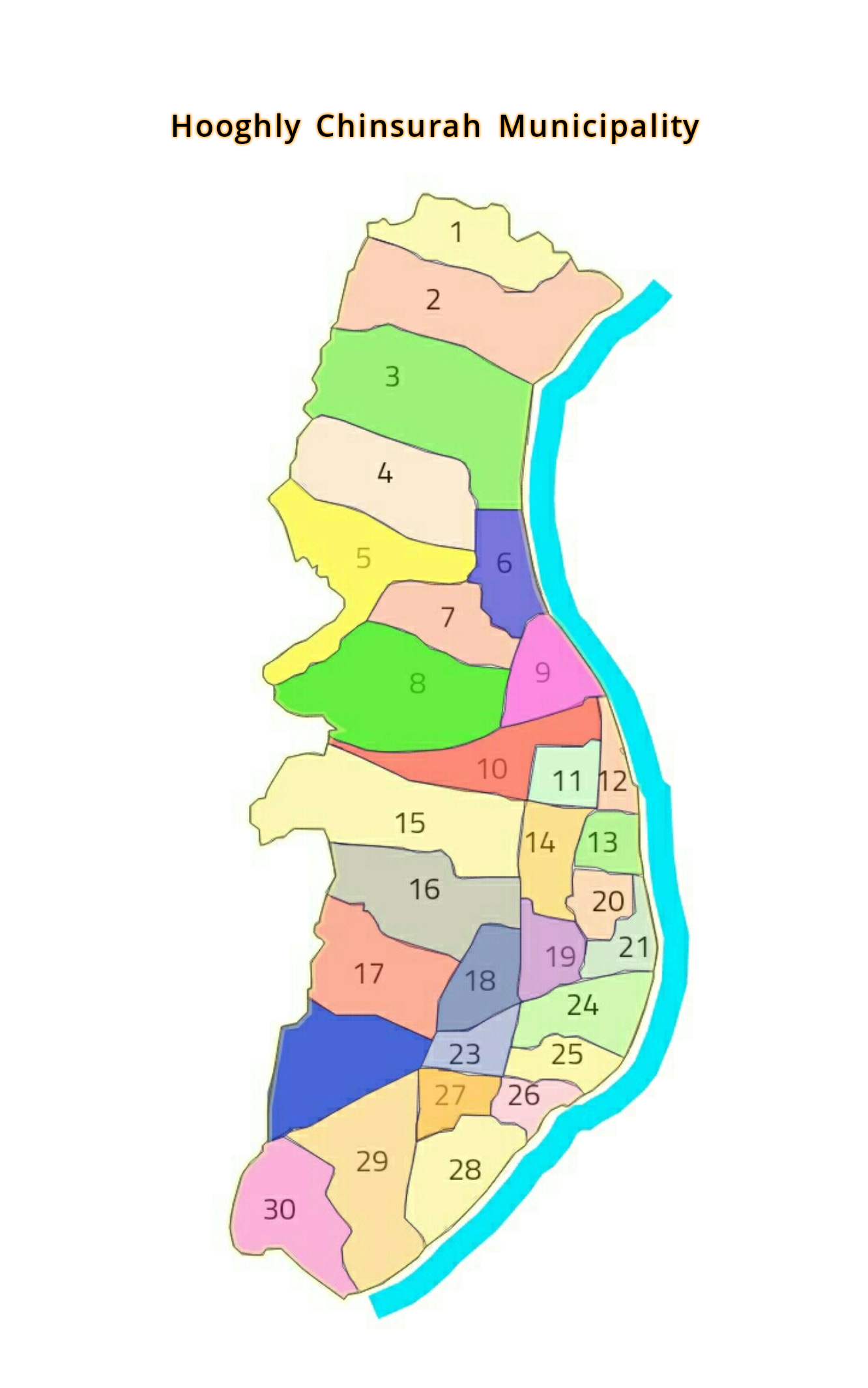
Map of Hooghly Chinsurah Municipality

Hooghly Chinsurah Municipality covers an area of 17.29 sq km and has a total population of 177,833 (2011).

In 1981, 24.72% of the total population formed main workers and 75.28% were non-workers in Hooghly Chinsurah Municipality and 25.49% of the total main workers were industrial workers. This may be interpreted as follows: although industrial activities are prominent in the municipal areas of the region, the major portion of the population is commuters and migrants find employment in the area.

== Healthcare ==
Hugli District Hospital with 550 beds, Chunchura Police Hospital with 98 beds and Hugli Jail Hospital with 27 beds are located in the Hooghly Chinsurah Municipality area.

== Elections ==
In the 2022 municipal elections for Hooghly Chinsurah Municipality, Trinamool Congress won 29 seats, CPI(M) 1 seat.

In the 2015 municipal elections for Hooghly Chinsurah Municipality, Trinamool Congress won 25 seats, CPI(M) 3 seats, Forward Bloc 1 seat and Congress 1 seat.

In the 2010 municipal elections for Hooghly Chinsurah Municipality, Trinamool Congress won 24 seats, CPI (M) 3 seats, Forward Bloc 2 seats and Congress won 1 seat.

About the 2010 municipal elections, The Guardian wrote, "Today's municipal elections are unlike any for decades: the Communists, who have held West Bengal's main towns almost without a break since the 1970s, are facing disaster… This time defeat is likely to be definitive and could signal the beginning of the end for the Communist Party of India-Marxist (CPIM)."

In the 2005 municipal elections for Hooghly Chinsurah Municipality, CPI (M) won 15 seats, RSP 2 seats, Forward Bloc 1 seat, Congress 3 seats and Trinamool Congress 9 seats.

== Wards ==
Details of the wards, with 2022 municipal election results, are as follows:

Ward No	Neighbourhood^{1}	Total Electors	Seat Type	Councillor	Party
1	Jhappukur, Keota Colony, Patrapukur, Sahaganj	7,263	General	Biplab Das	CPI (M)
2	Netaji Nagar, Sahaganj	7,816	General	Ranjan Raha	Trinamool Congress
3	Sahaganj, Shyamsundarpur, Balagarh, Tyrebagan	10,534	General	Anindita Rajbanshi (Mondal)	Trinamool Congress
4	Bandel, Milan Park	7,552	General	Saraswati Pal	Trinamool Congress
5	Gandhi Colony	4,699	Woman	Mousumi Saha	Trinamool Congress
6	Chawk Bazar	7,552	General	Jhantu Kumar Biswas	Trinamool Congress
7	Roy Bazar Colony, Baralgali, Kapasdanga	5,115	General	Rita Dutta	Trinamool Congress
8	Kapasdanga	9,877	Woman	Nirmal Chakraborty	Trinamool Congress
9	Imambazar Road, Hooghly	3,366	General	Suparna Sen	Trinamool Congress
10	Chawk Bazar	4,241	Women	Mousumi Majhi (Mampi)	Trinamool Congress
11	Ghutiyabazar	2,674	Woman	Mousumi Basu Chatterjee	Trinamool Congress
12	Ghutiabazar, Tamlipara	1,961	General	Arup Banerjee	BJP
13	Shilbagan, Hooghly	2,818	General	Jaydeb Adhikari	Trinamool Congress
14	Hooghly	3,465	Woman	Chandrima Sarkar(Bhattacharya)	Trinamool Congress
15	Khagrajole, Mearber	9,144	General	Indrajit Dutta (Bota)	Trinamool Congress
16	Dharampur, Sriguru Nagar	8,418	General	Arpita Saha	Trinamool Congress
17	Chinsurah	6,241	Women	Ratna Adhikari	Congress
18	Suripara, Chinsurah	4,373	Woman	Sudipa Mitra	Trinamool Congress
19	Taldanga	3,827	SC Woman	Sanjita Dhar	Trinamool Congress
20	Mogaltuli	2,886	General	Samir Sarkar	Trinamool Congress
21	Barabazar	2,587	Women	Mita Chatterjee	Trinamool Congress
22	Satyapirtala, Pratapgarh	5,887	General	Vacant	Vacant
23	Chinsurah	2,970	General	Dibyendu Adhikari	Trinamool Congress
24	Chinsurah	3,342	General	Srabani Das	Trinamool Congress
25	Ghatakpara, Hooghly	2,377	General	Amit Ray	Trinamool Congress
26	Sandeswartala, Hooghly	2,591	Woman	Partha Saha	Trinamool Congress
27	Hooghly	2,453	General	Shyama Prasad Mukherjee	Trinamool Congress
28	Kanakshali	4,285	SC	Debjani Dutta	Trinamool Congress
29	Hooghly	6,037	General	Gourikanta Mukherjee (Bhajan)	Trinamool Congress
30	Boro Mitra Bagan	5,109	General	Soumitra Ghosh (Pilte)	Trinamool Congress

This is a broad indication of the neighbourhood covered, not a full description
