= Camellia Institute of Technology & Management =

College in West Bengal, India

Camellia Institute of Technology & Management Boinchi
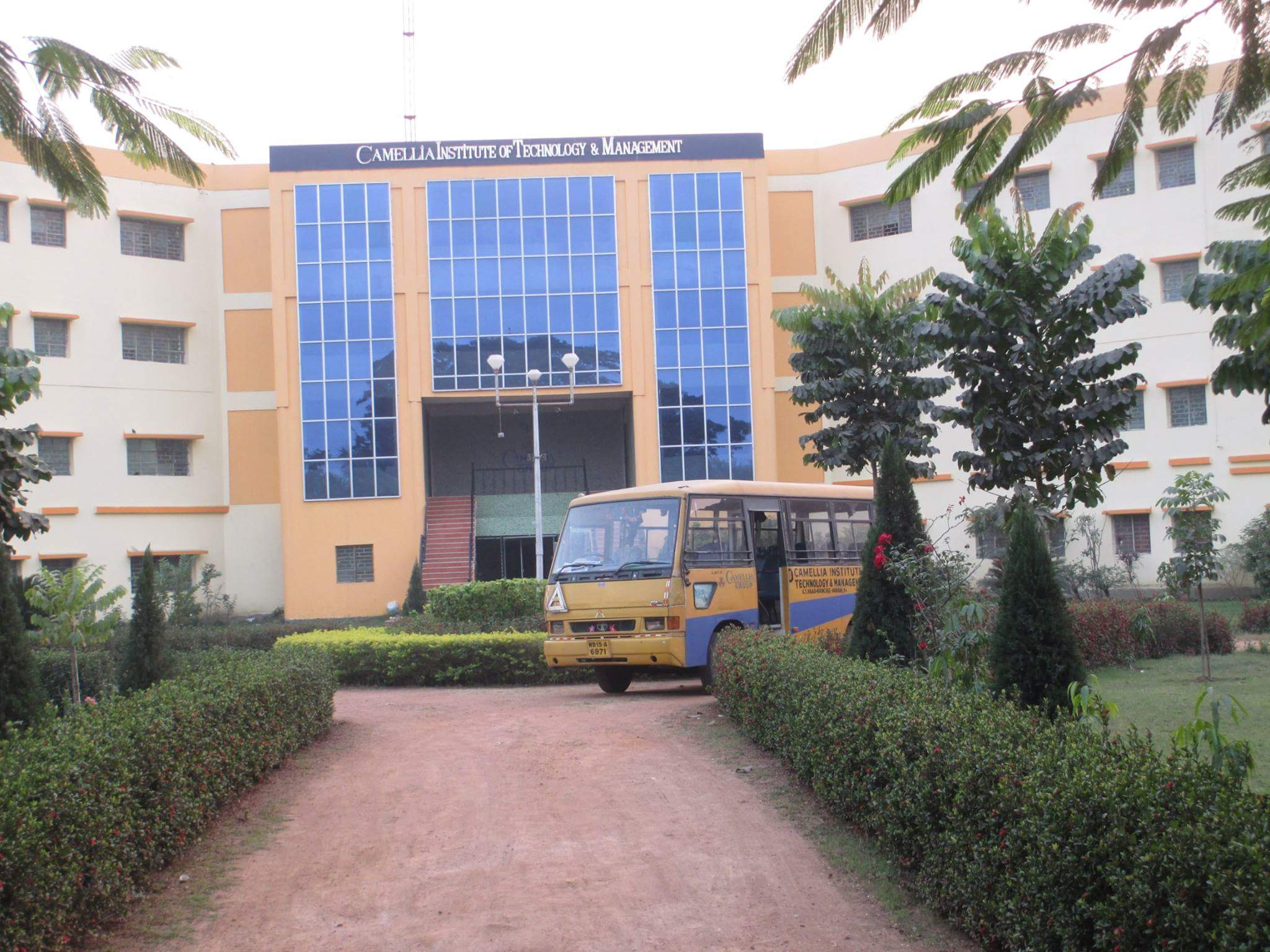
- Other name: CITM
- Type: Private
- Established: 2009
- Accreditation: All India Council of Technical Education (AICTE)
- Academic affiliations: MAKAUT[MAULANA ABUL KALAM AZAD UNIVERSITY OF TECHNOLOGY, WEST BENGAL (FORMERLY KNOWN AS WEST BENGAL UNIVERSITY OF TECHNOLOGY)]
- Chairman: N.R Datt
- Principal: prof.(Dr) Rajarshi Sanyal
- Location: Boinchi, West Bengal, India; 23°06′39.30″N 88°12′02.50″E
- Website: www.citm.org.in

Camellia Institute of Technology & Management, commonly known as CITM, is an private degree engineering college in West Bengal, India, situated in Boinchi, Hooghly.The institute is established in 2009 under Camellia Group affiliated with Maulana Abul Kalam Azad University of Technology (formally known as WBUT). It is recognised by the Government of West Bengal and its courses are approved by the All India Council for Technical Education (AICTE).

== Courses ==
=== Btech in ===
- Civil Engineering
- Computer Science and Engineering
- Electronics and Communication Engineering
- Electrical Engineering
- Mechanical Engineering

=== Diploma courses ===
- Civil Engineering
- Mechanical Engineering
- Electrical Engineering
- Computer Science Engineering

=== Hostel ===
There is a hostel inside of the college campus for students.

=== Admission ===
Admission to the B.Tech. courses is on the basis of the position secured by the candidate in the West Bengal Joint Entrance Examination And Joint Entrance Examination – Main.

In all courses, 90% of students of approved intake capacity are admitted on the basis of merit position secured by the candidate in West Bengal Joint Entrance Examination. The 10% balance of students are admitted from Joint Entrance Examination – Main as per the norms stipulated by the UGC and the West Bengal.Diploma holders in any engineering and technical discipline can enter for a degree course in the second year at CITM, through the admission test JELET conducted by Central Selection Committee (CSC). Among these, some (1 or 2) seats are also available for Reserved Category, Tuition Fee Waiver (TFW) and PwD candidates.
