= Mahanad =

- Village
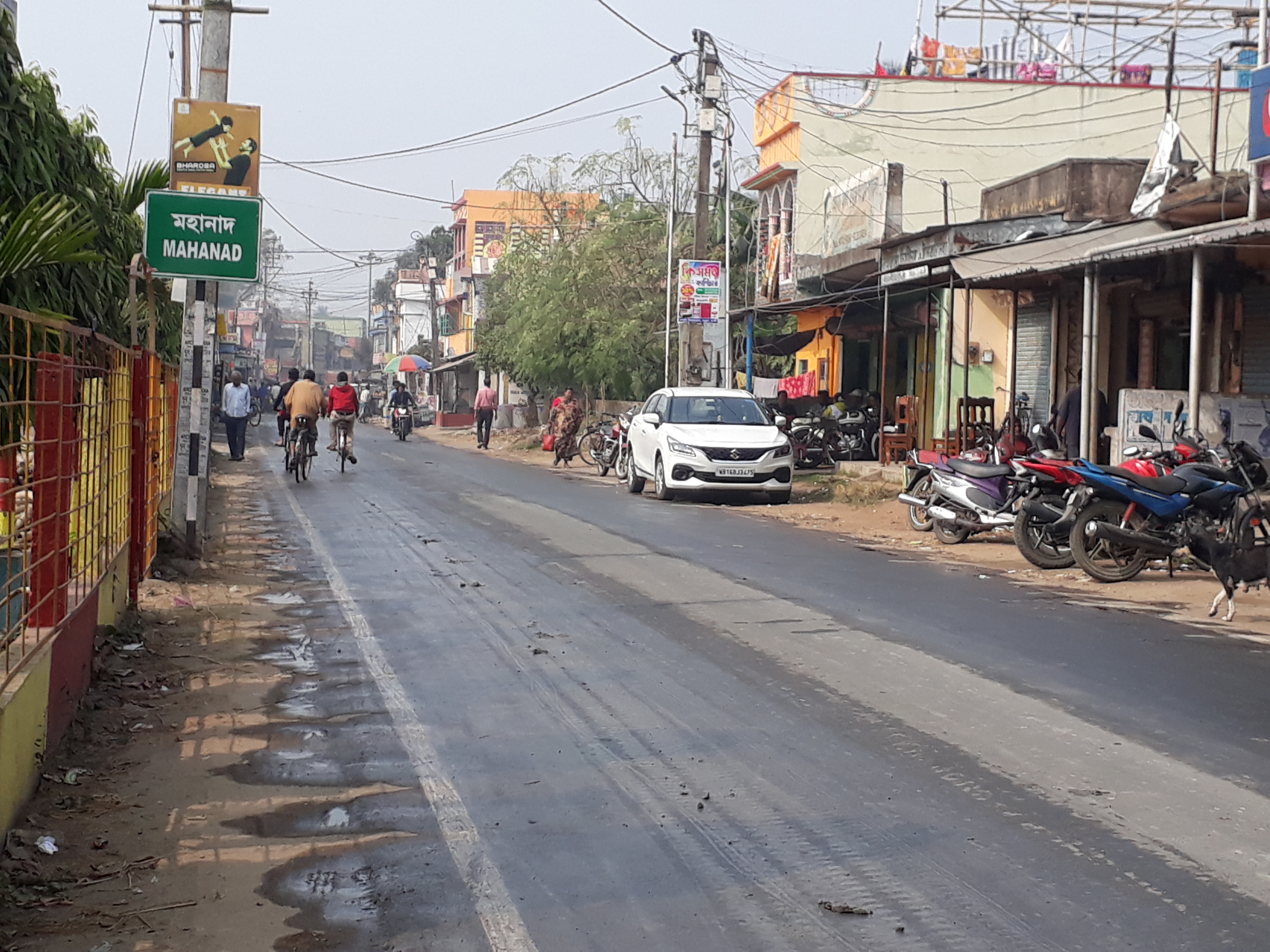
- Mahanad Chowrasta

- Location in West Bengal, India Mahanad (India)
- Coordinates: 23.00°N 88.26°E
- Country: India
- State: West Bengal
- District: Hooghly

Government
  - Type: Panchayati raj (India)
  - Body: Gram panchayat
- Elevation: 15 m (49 ft)

Languages
  - Official: Bengali, English
- Time zone: UTC+5:30 (IST)
- PIN: 712149, 712148
- Telephone code: 03213
- ISO 3166 code: IN-WB
- Vehicle registration: WB
- Lok Sabha constituency: Hooghly
- Vidhan Sabha constituency: Saptagram

Mahanad is a gram panchayat, or village, in Polba-Dadpur, a Community development block in Chinsurah subdivision of Hooghly district in the Indian state of West Bengal.

== Geography ==
Cities and towns in the Chandannagore subdivision and Polba Dadpur and Dhaniakhali CD Blocks of Chinsurah subdivision in Hooghly district
M: municipal corporation/ municipal city/ town, CT: census town, R: rural/ urban centre,
Owing to space constraints in the small map, the actual locations in a larger map may vary slightly

== History ==
Archaeological Survey of India (ASI) has found many historic artifacts dating from the Gupta Era in Mahanad. An ancient Shiva temple in Mahanad is called Jateswer Shiv Temple. Mahand has been the yogpeeth (yoga retreat) of Nath Yogis, for thousands of years.

Mahanad has an excavated site revealing a historic Kushan presence. The exploration conducted by ASI and Paresh Pal, a local antiquarian, have led to the discovery of coins of the Kushan and Gupta dynasties and terracotta, mostly of Gupta style.

== Location ==
Mahanad is located at 23.00°N 88.26°E. It has an average elevation of 15 metres above sea level. Mahanad is located around 19 kilometer away from its district headquarters, Hugli-Chuchura. The nearest railway station is Pandua in the Howrah-Bardhaman main line around 7 km away.

== Gallery ==
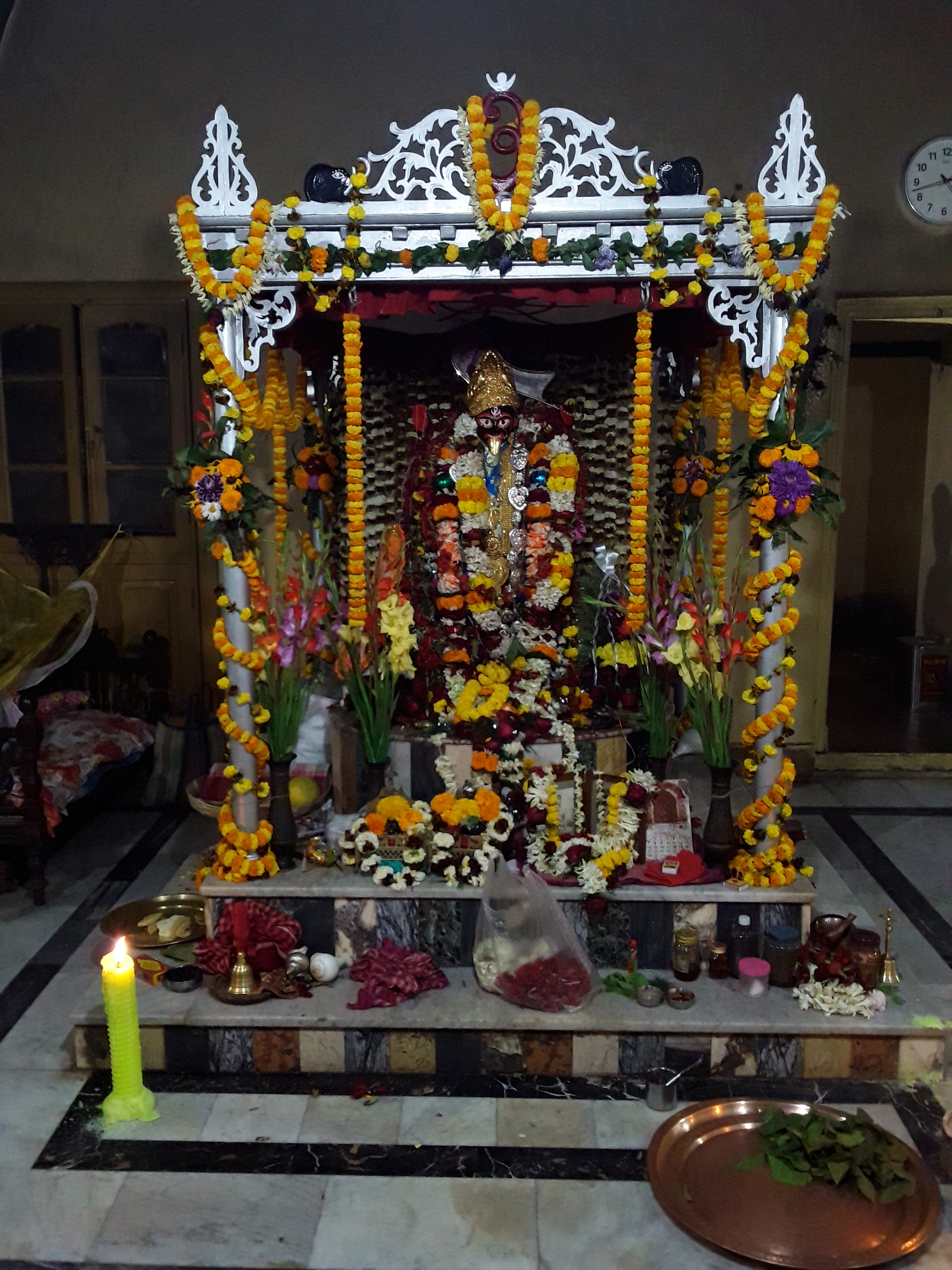
Brohmomoyee kali maa

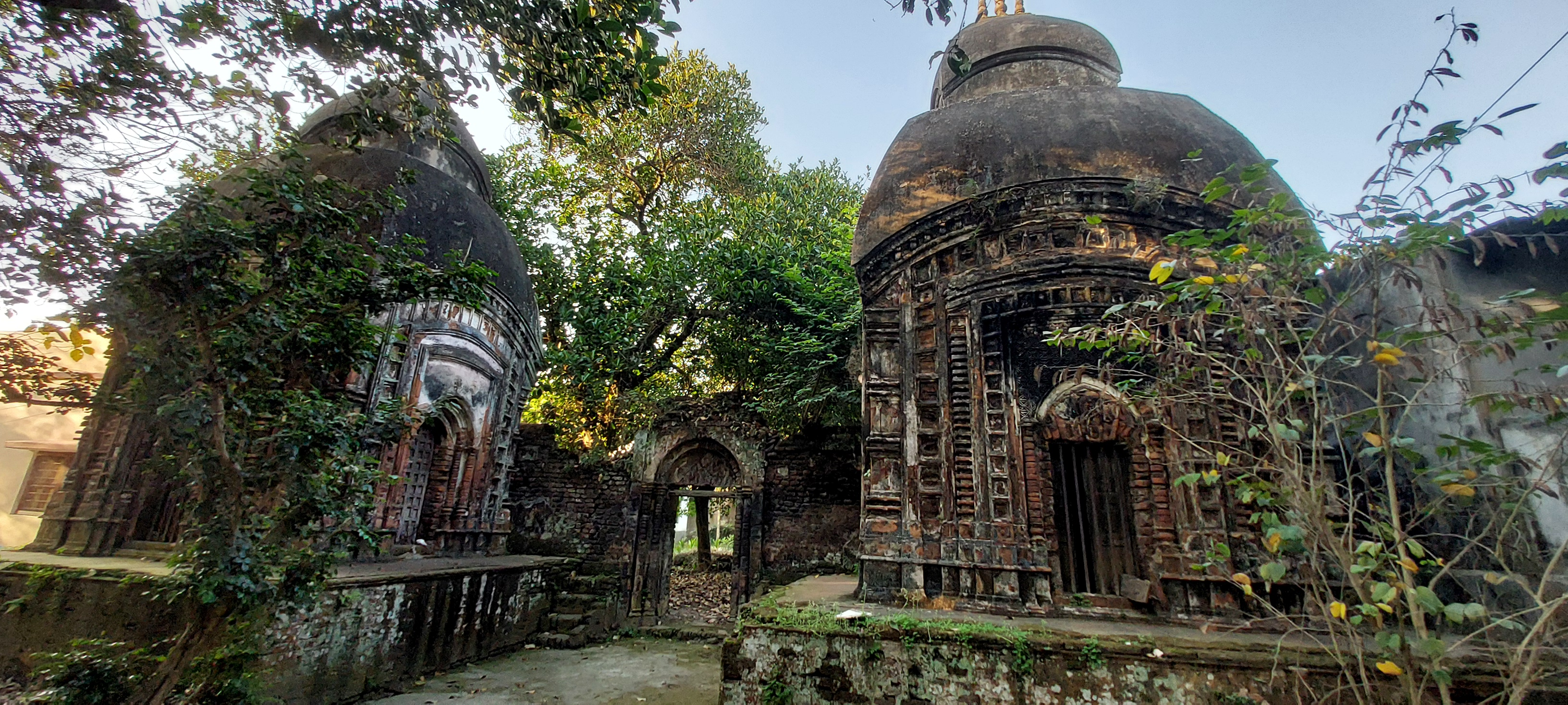
Mahanad Jora Shiva Temple

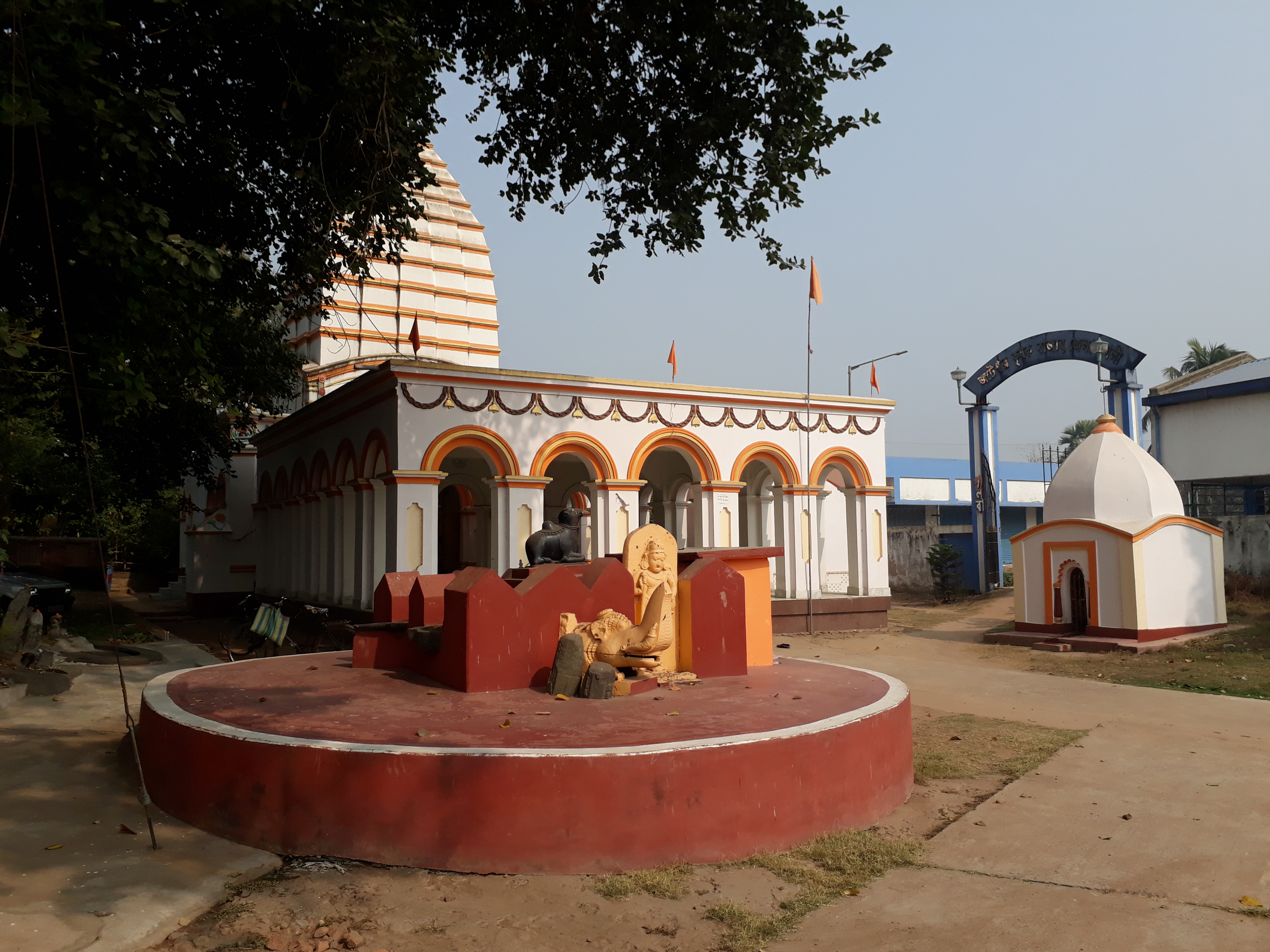
Mahanad Jateswar Shiv temple complex

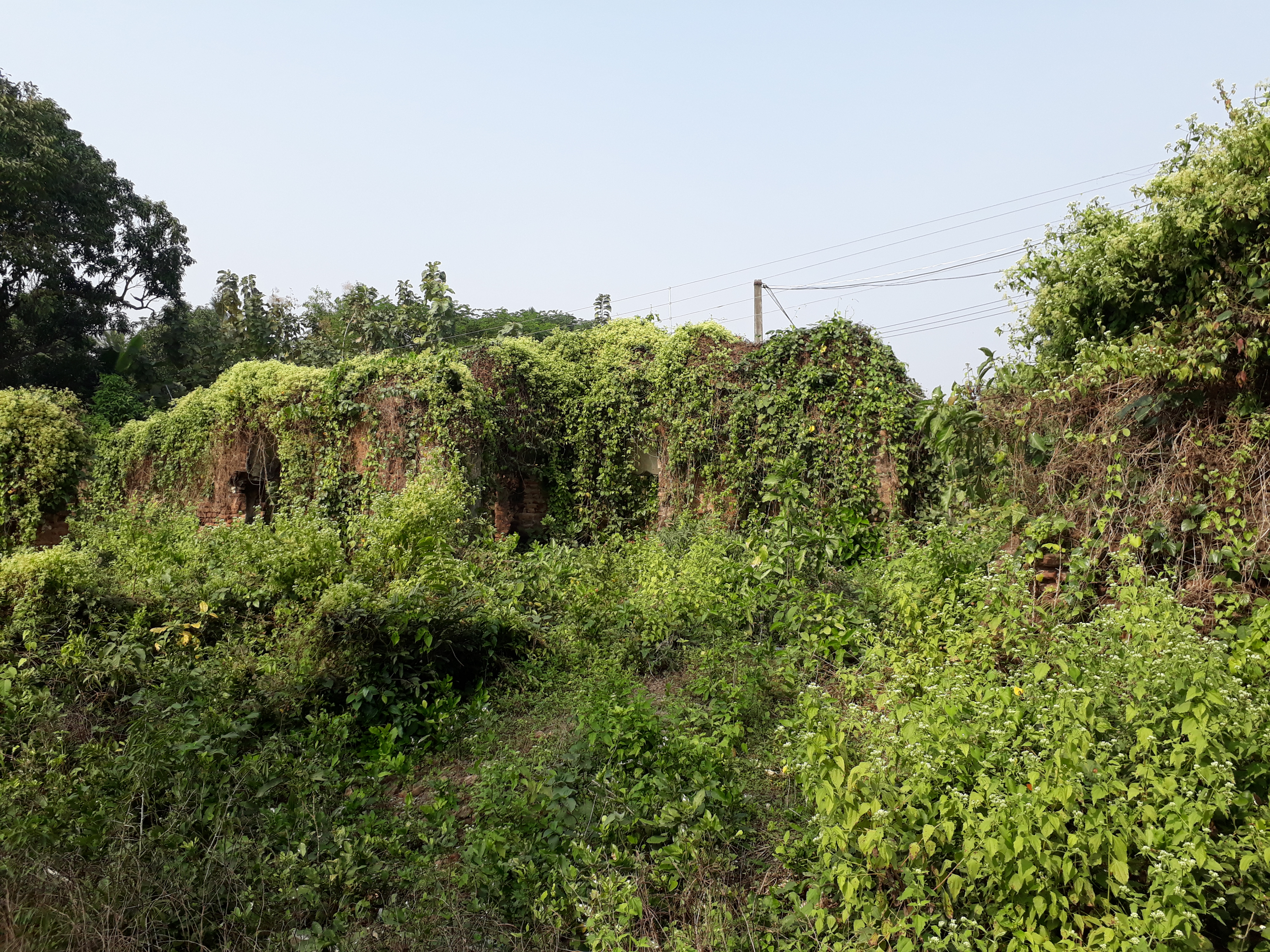
Ruins of Mahanad Rajbari at Mahanad

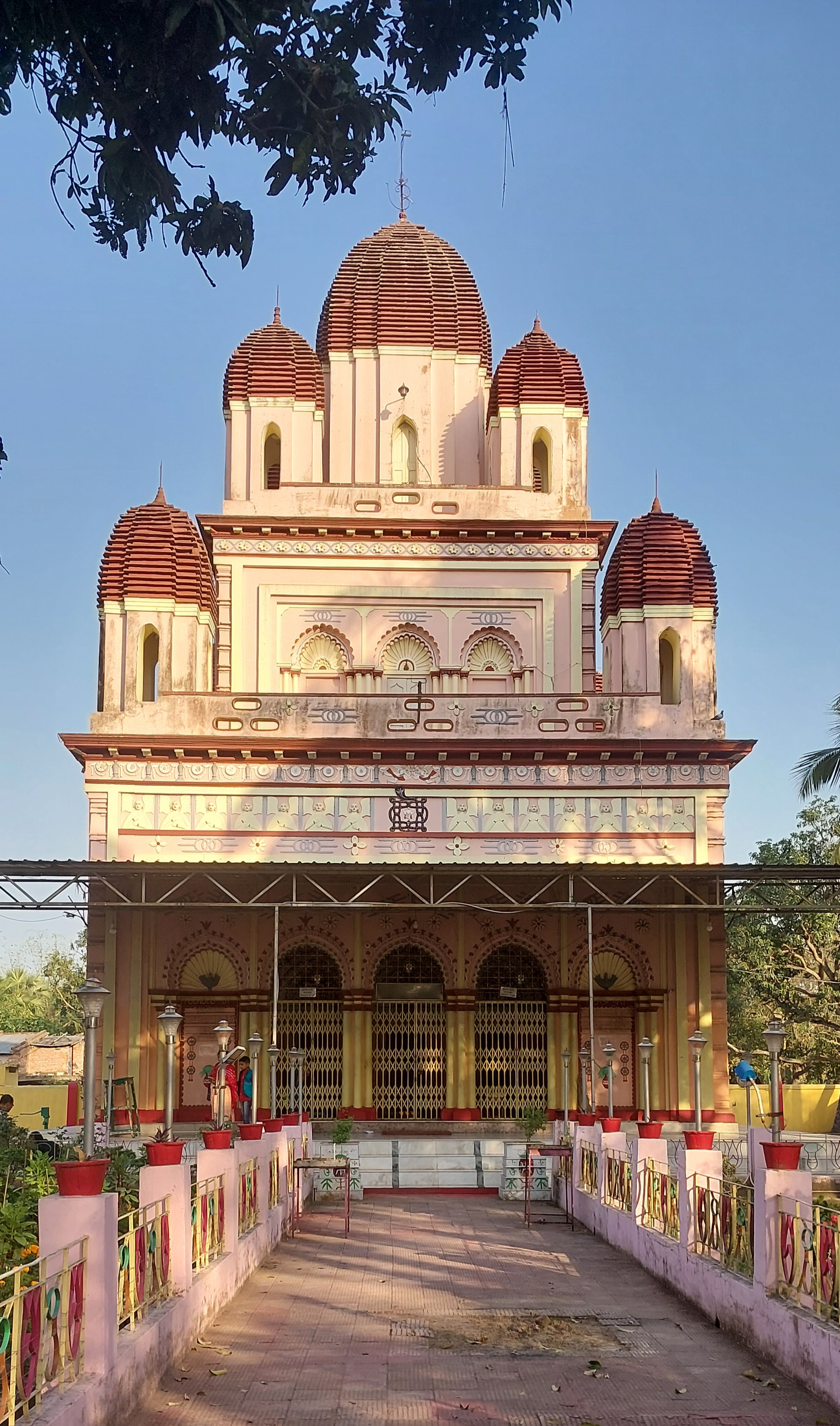
Brohmomoyee Kali Temple front view

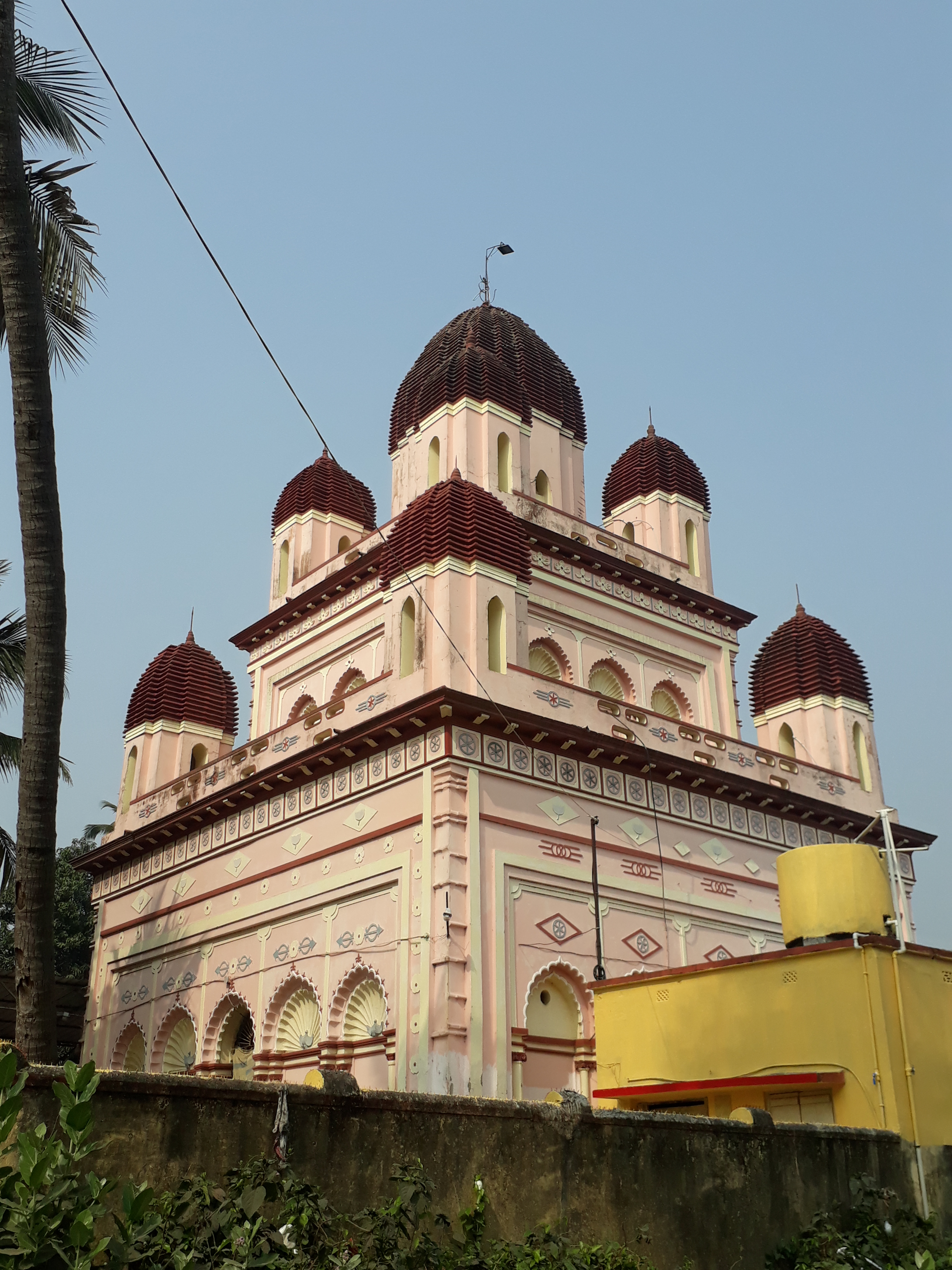
Brohmomoyee Kali mandir, backside view
