= Dhaniakhali =

- Village
- Location in West Bengal, India Dhaniakhali (India)
- Coordinates: 22°58′1″N 88°5′26″E
- Country: India
- State: West Bengal
- District: Hooghly

Government
  - Type: Panchayati raj (India)
  - Body: Gram panchayat
- Elevation: 16 m (52 ft)

Population (2011)
  - Total: 373,800

Languages
  - Official: Bengali, English, Hindi
- Time zone: UTC+5:30 (IST)
- PIN: 712302 (Dhaniakhali)
- Telephone/STD code: 03213
- ISO 3166 code: IN-WB
- Vehicle registration: WB
- Literacy: 80.73%
- Lok Sabha constituency: Hooghly
- Vidhan Sabha constituency: Dhanekhali
- Website: hooghly.gov.in

Dhaniakhali (Bengali : ধনিয়াখালি) is a village in Dhaniakhali CD Block in Chinsurah subdivision of Hooghly district in the Indian state of West Bengal. The place has lent its name to the popular Dhaniakhali Sari.

== Geography ==
Cities and towns in the Chandannagore subdivision and Polba Dadpur and Dhaniakhali CD Blocks of Chinsurah subdivision in Hooghly district
M: municipal corporation/ municipal city/ town, CT: census town, R: rural/ urban centre,
Owing to space constraints in the small map, the actual locations in a larger map may vary slightly

=== Location ===
Dhaniakhali is located at 22°58′1″N 88°5′26″E.

The area is composed of flat alluvial plains that form a part of the Gangetic Delta.

=== Police station ===
Dhaniakhali police station has jurisdiction over a part of Dhaniakhali CD Block.

=== CD Block HQ ===
The headquarters of Dhaniakhali CD Block are located at Dhaniakhali.

=== Urbanisation ===
In Chandannagore subdivision 58.52% of the population is rural and the urban population is 41.48%. Chandannagore subdivision has 1 municipal corporation, 3 municipalities and 7 census towns. The single municipal corporation is Chandernagore Municipal Corporation. The municipalities are Tarakeswar Municipality, Bhadreswar Municipality and Champdany Municipality. Of the three CD Blocks in Chandannagore subdivision, Tarakeswar CD Block is wholly rural, Haripal CD Block is predominantly rural with just 1 census town, and Singur CD Block is slightly less rural with 6 census towns. Polba Dadpur and Dhaniakhali CD Blocks of Chinsurah subdivision (included in the map alongside) are wholly rural. The municipal areas are industrialised. All places marked in the map are linked in the larger full screen map.

== Demographics ==
As per 2011 Census of India Dhaniakhali had a total population of 3,738 of which 1,755 (47%) were males and 1,983 (53%) were females. Population below 6 years was 302. The total number of literates in Dhaniakhali was 2,744 (80.73% of the population over 6 years).

== Dhaniakhali Saris ==
According to The Hindu Business Line, "The Bengal cotton sari is a fashion statement, wherever it is worn" and have a market all over the country. The Times of India says that Dhaniakhali, Shantipur and Phulia are well–known for the traditional handloom sarees of West Bengal.

The weaving of Jamdani saris originated in Dhaka in Bangladesh. Dhakai jamdani was famous among the aristocratic ladies in olden days. Places like Shantipur, Dhaniakhali, Begampur and Farasdanga started producing the jamdani sarees, after the partition of India.

Mamata Banerjee, the West Bengal former chief minister, generally wears only Dhaniakhali tant sari and has become a popular 'brand ambassador'.

== Potato flake factory ==
Ascon Agro Products Limited, jointly owned by the SPS Group and the Pailan Group, produces potato flakes at Dhaniakhali. Initially set up as a fully export-oriented unit, it has subsequently acquired permission to sell in the domestic market also. It is locally marketed using the POTO brand. Potato flakes are used to make snacks and are also used as a thickening agent in soups and bakery products. The plant was inaugurated by Buddhadeb Bhattacharjee, the West Bengal chief minister, in 2007. West Bengal produces around 80 lakh tonnes of potatoes annually and local consumption is around 45 lakh tonnes. The rest is sold outside the state. Ascon Agro Products Limited is diversifying in a big way.

== Transport ==
Tarakeswar - Dhaniakhali - Chuchura road passes through Dhaniakhali. Busses available for Tarakeswar, Chuchura, Haripal, Dasghara, Kolkata etc. Tarakeswar - Dhaniakhali - Magra new railway line is on progress.

== Education ==
Sarat Centenary College was founded in 1976 (the birth centenary year of Bangla novelist Sarat Chandra Chattopadhyay) as a junior college and was subsequently upgraded to an undergraduate degree college with affiliation from The University of Burdwan in 1978. The college offers undergraduate Honours and General degree courses in Arts (Literature & Language, Humanities & Social Sciences), Commerce, and Science (Physical and Biological) streams. The college is aided by the Government of West Bengal under its Grants-in-Aid scheme. In 2016 the college was reaccredited (2nd cycle) by NAAC with a CGPA of 2.33 (grade B). The college is also recognised by UGC under Section 2F & 12B Act of 1956.

== Healthcare ==
There is a rural hospital (with 30 beds) at Dhaniakhali.

Jannedra Memorial Child Health Care Hospital, set up by Lions Club (with 25 beds), is located at Dhaniakhali.
