= Pandua =

Pandua may refer to:

- Pandu (actor) (1947–2021), a Tamil film actor
- Pandua (community development block), Hooghly District, West Bengal
- Pandua (Vidhan Sabha constituency), Hooghly District, West Bengal
- Pandua, Malda, now known as Adina, ruins of a historic town in Malda district, West Bengal, India.
- Pandua, Hooghly, Hooghly District, West Bengal, India
