= Itachuna Rajbari =

Heritage mansion in Itachuna, India

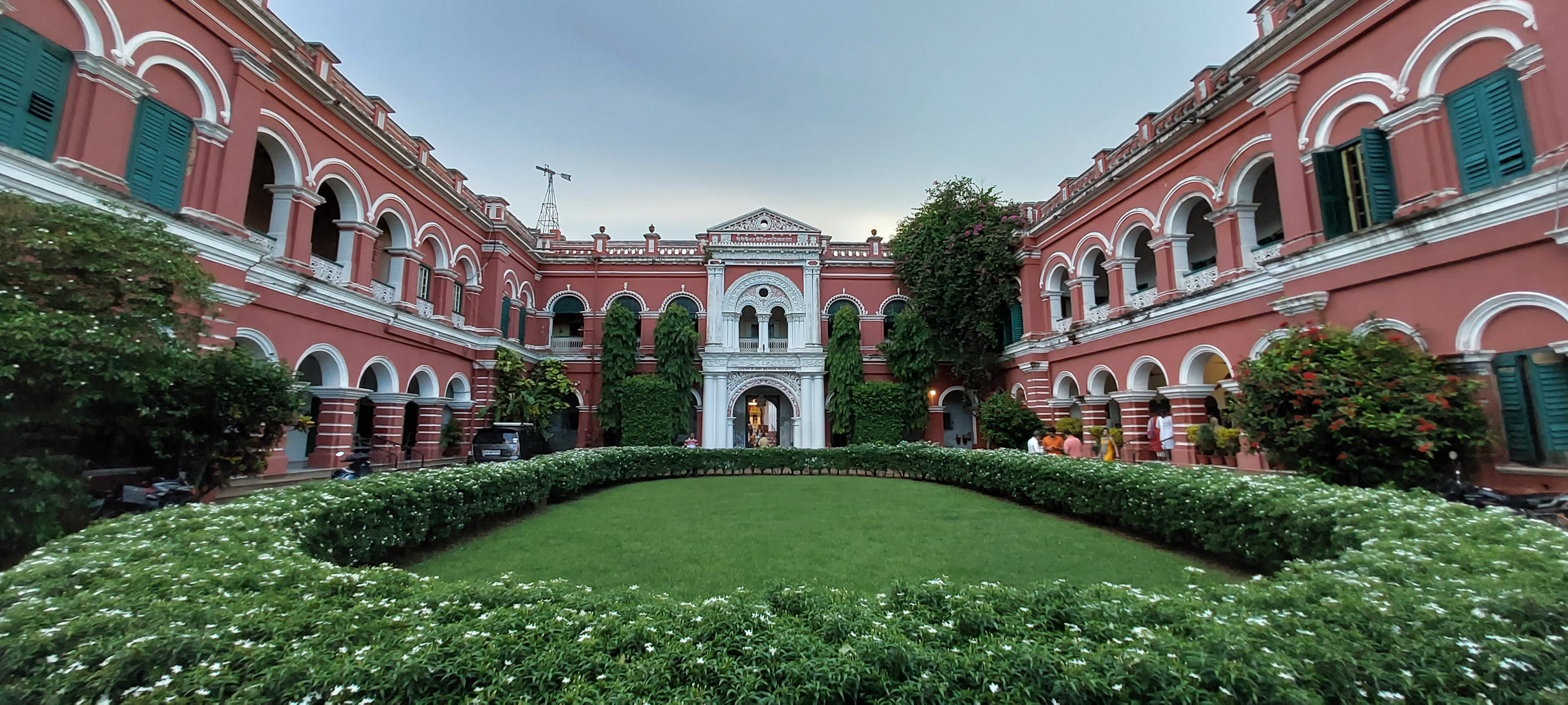
- The façade of Itachuna Rajbari
- Alternative names: Bargee Danga

General information
- Type: Palace
- Architectural style: Bengali architecture
- Location: Itachuna, Hooghly district, West Bengal, India
- Coordinates: 23°01′51.7″N 88°18′31.1″E
- Completed: 1766
- Renovated: 1896
- Owner: Kundu family

Website
- https://www.itachunarajbari.com/

Itachuna Rajbari is a heritage zamindar house in Itachuna village in Hooghly district, West Bengal, India. It was established in 1766 by Safallya Narayan Kundu and remained associated with the Kundu family. The building is a traditional Bengali mansion with a large courtyard and a thakurdalan. It underwent major renovation in 1896 and is currently managed by descendants of the Kundu family. In the 2010s, the property has been converted into a heritage homestay.

== History ==
During the mid-18th century, Bengal faced the Maratha invasions of Bengal. The raids began around 1742, during the reign of Alivardi Khan, the Nawab of Bengal, and continued for about a decade.

The raids were connected with the collection of chauth, a payment claimed by the Marathas that was generally equivalent to one-fourth of the revenue. The raids affected several parts of Bengal Subah, with Katwa serving as an important centre before the Maratha cavalry extended their activities towards other areas, including Medinipur.

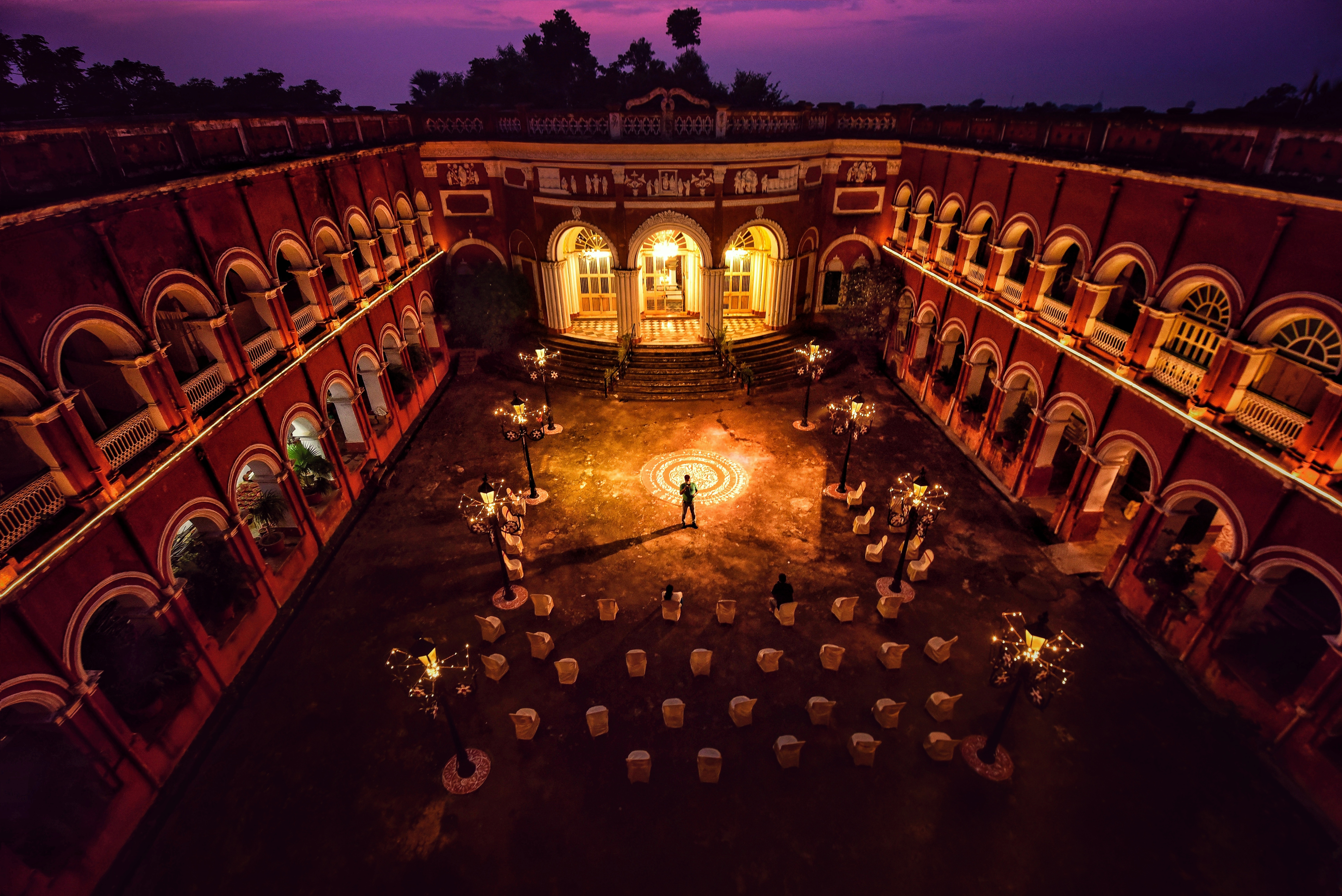
The thakurdalan during special occasions

The raids eventually ended after the Nawab of Bengal reached a peace agreement with the Marathas. Some Maratha groups later settled in Bengal and became integrated into the local society.

Some of the Maratha Bargis known as Kundans settled in the area and gradually came to be known as the Kundus.

Owing to the association with these Maratha Bargis, the Rajbari is also locally referred to as the "Bargee Danga". The Rajbari was built in 1766 during the tenure of Safallya Narayan Kundu. In 1896, the palace was refurbished significantly by Safallya Narayan Kundu's son, Narayan Kundu, and Dhruba Narayan Kundu's father.

Following the abolition of the zamindari system in India after the First Amendment of the Constitution of India in 1951, much of the family's property was acquired by the state government for the establishment of schools, hospitals and providing other public services. This affected the family's estates and caused significant difficulties in the maintenance of the Rajbari.

== Architecture ==
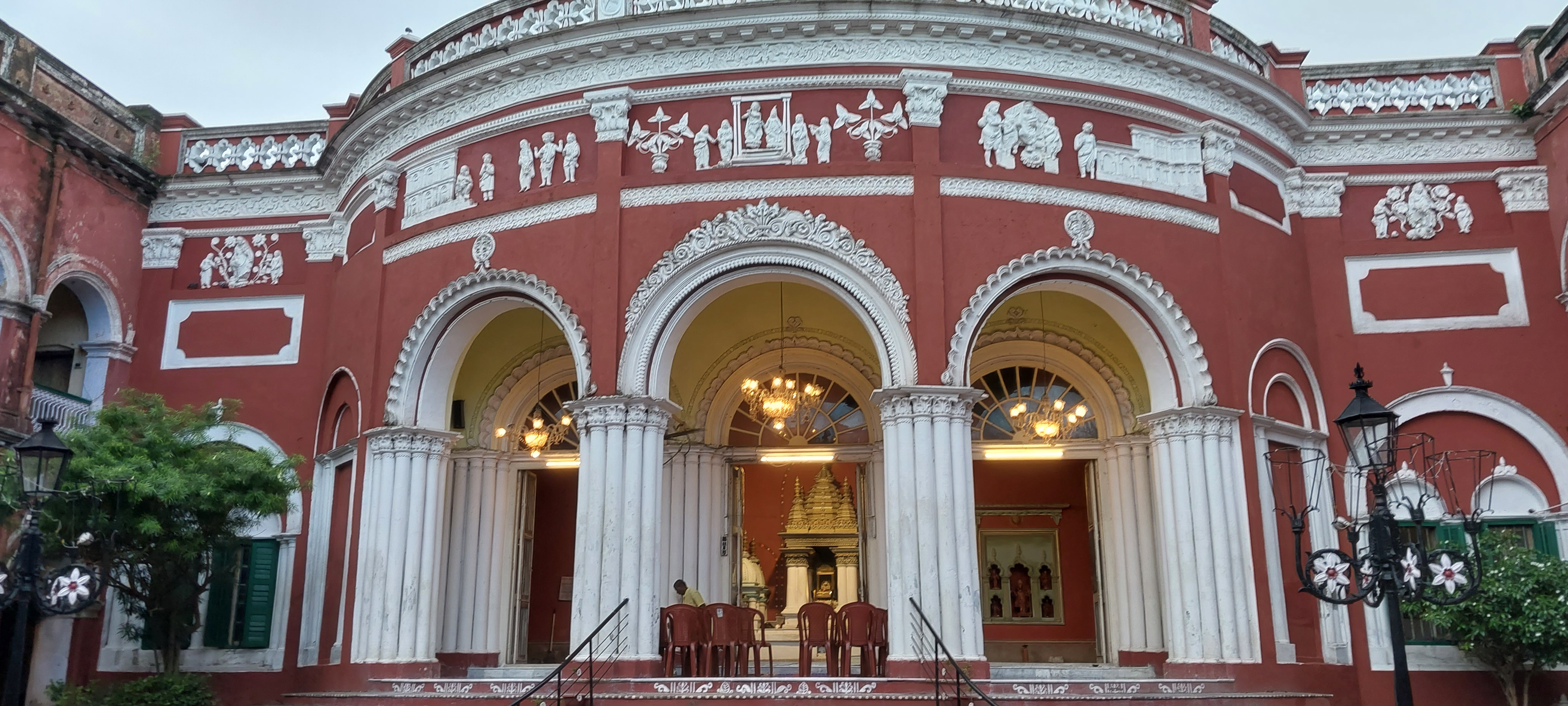
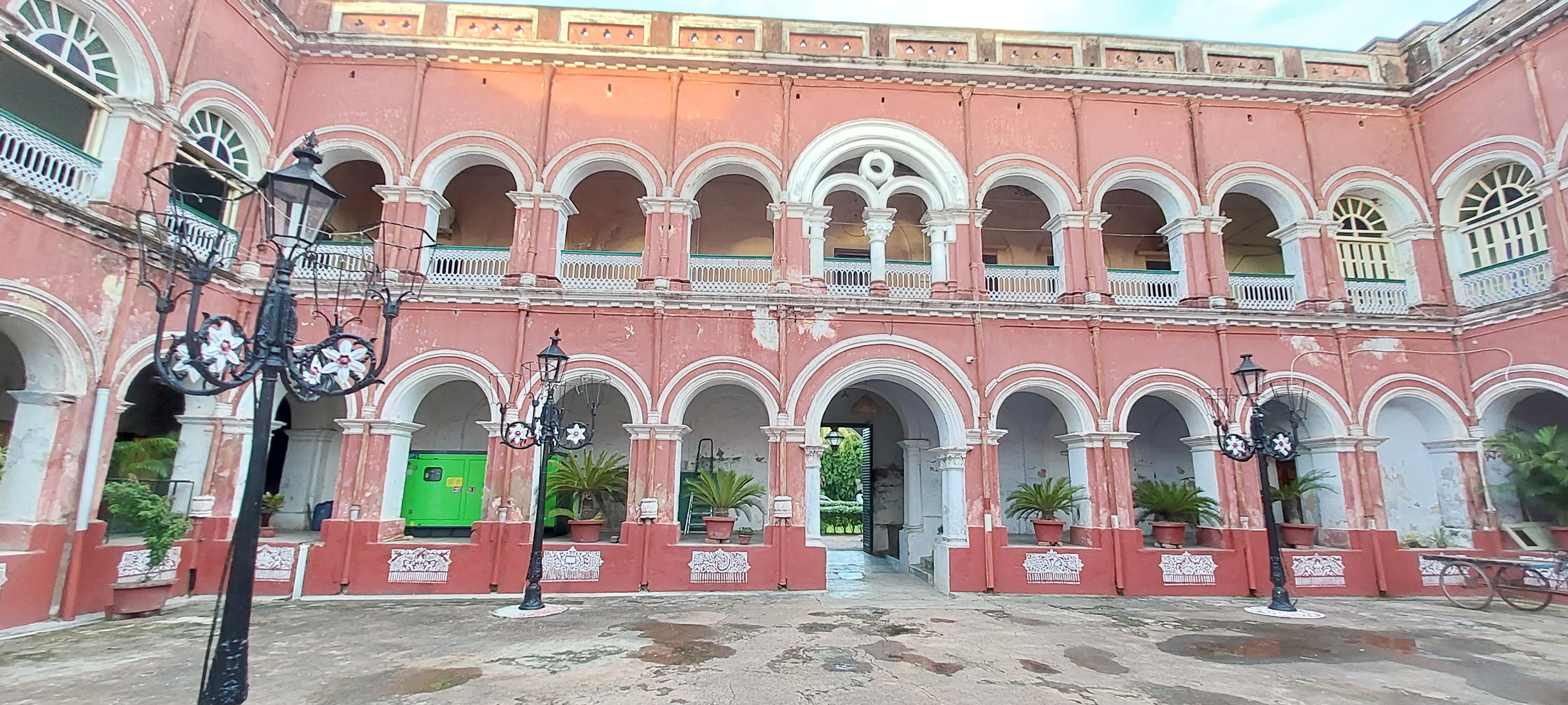
The Bengali architecture in the Rajbari

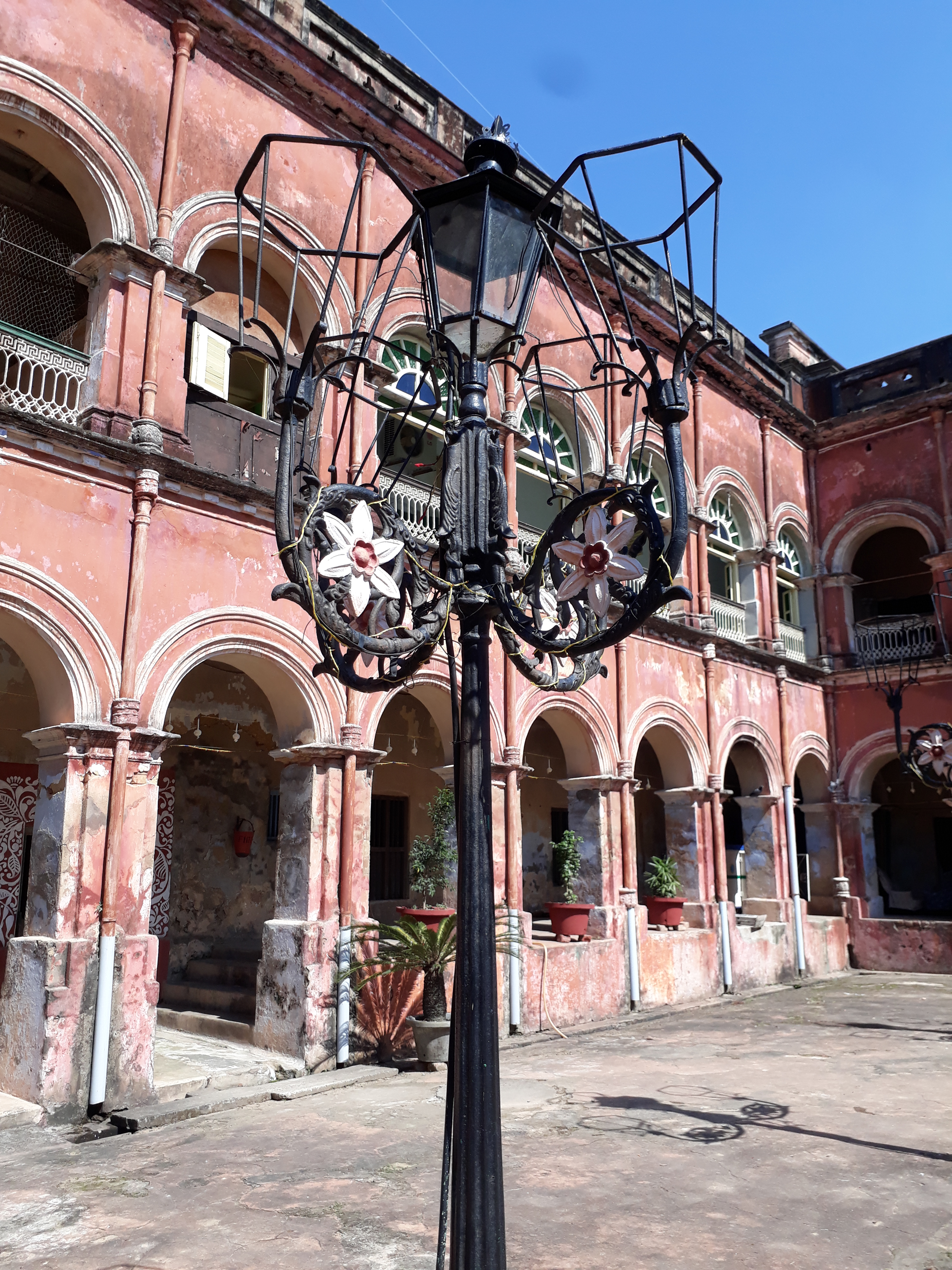
The cast-iron lamp posts

The Rajbari is divided into five sections: a central courtyard area known as the Thakur dalan, a dance hall with alpana decoration, a kitchen section, a guesthouse and an Andarmahal. The property also contains a worshipping room dedicated to the family deities.

The Andarmahal has living quarters and staircase traditionally reserved for the women of the household. The small windows in the corridors of the Anadarmahal allowed the women to look outside without being easily seen from outside.

The dance hall contains a chandelier and hand-operated ceiling fans. Most of the old furniture have been retained — including metal storage chests, old chairs, wooden tables, carved bedposts and low sofas. Portraits of various family ancestors are hung on the walls of the dance hall. The complex also has a pond known as the Khirki Pukur, which is reserved for the exclusive use by the women of the household. There's also a meeting hall with a large chandelier.

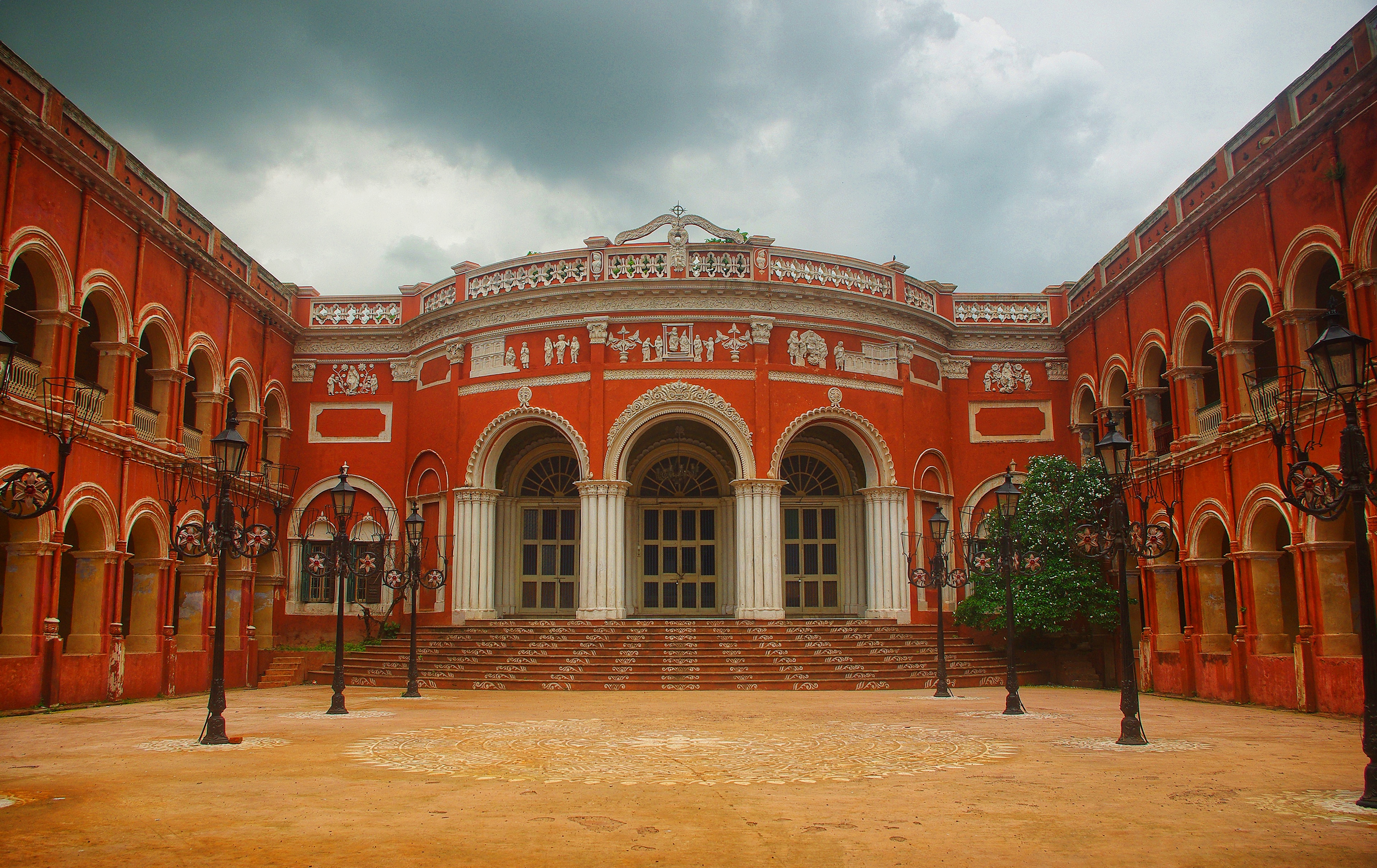
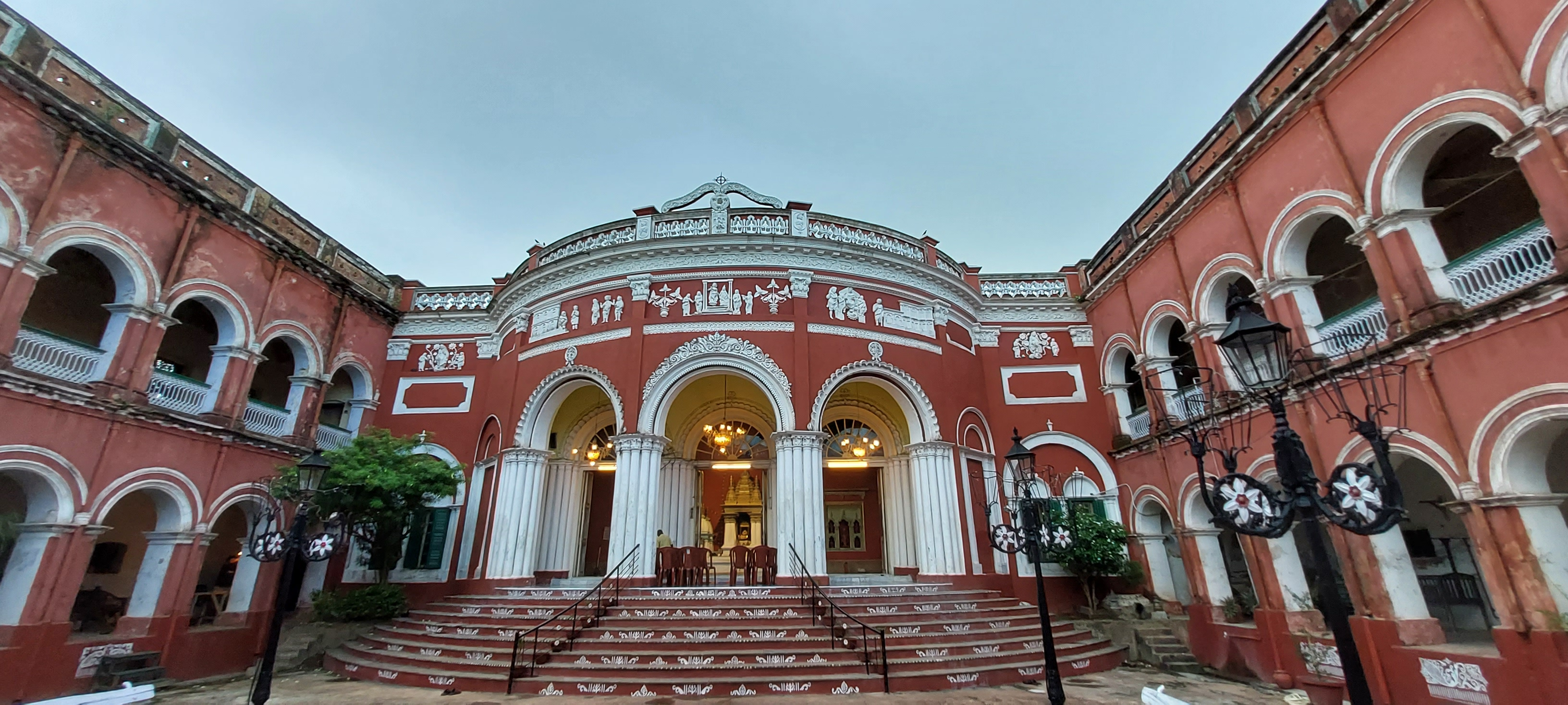
The Thakurdalan

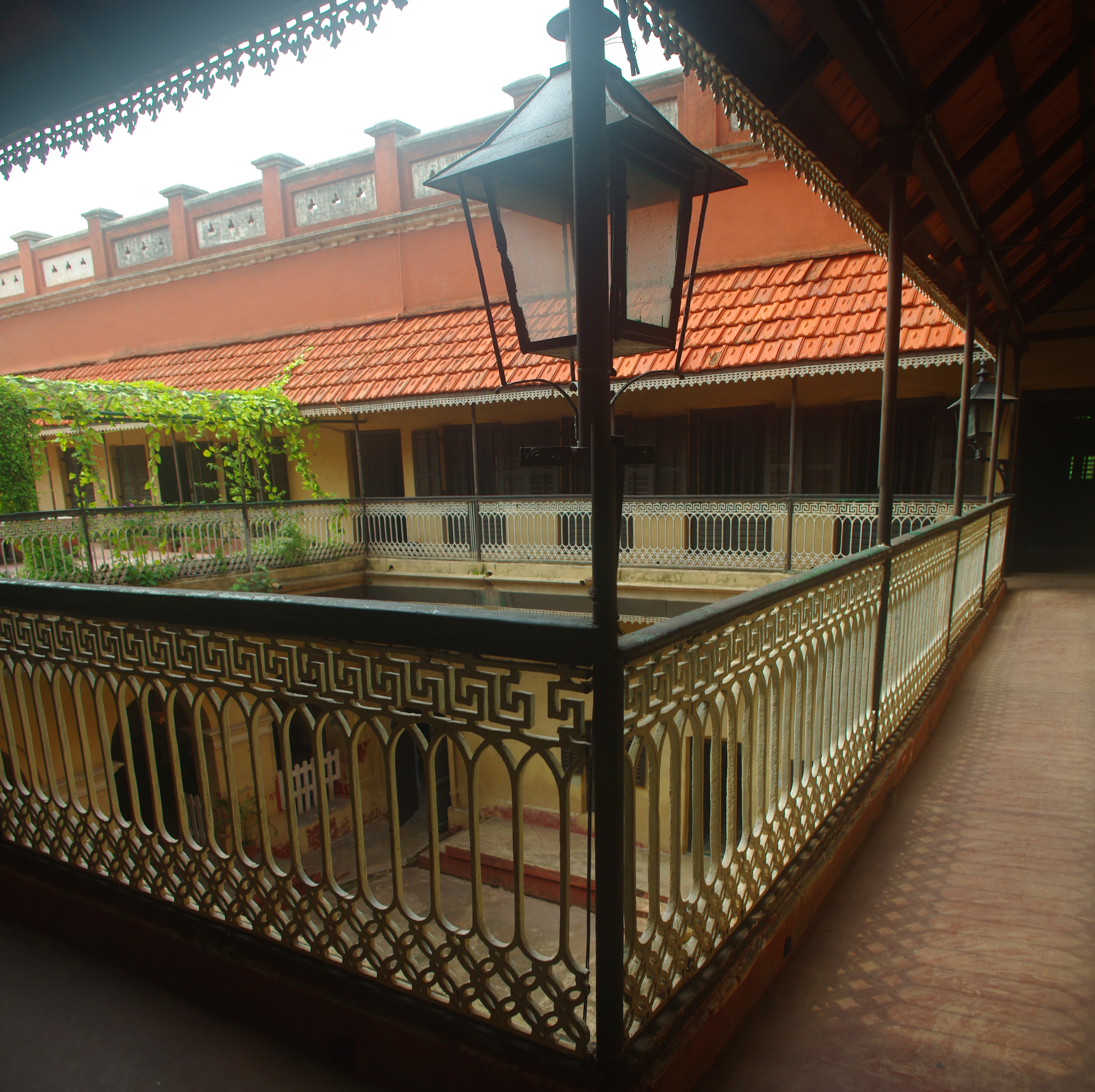
The corridor of the andarmahal

The building retains several features of its earlier design, including high-beamed ceilings and thick walls. The rooms open onto a garden terrace furnished with antique pieces and a fountain. The outer section includes a kachari house, accounts room and the room used by the market official. The courtyard is adorned with arrays of cast-iron large lamp posts.

The complex also includes an art gallery, an engraved family tree chart, spiral staircases and a number of temples. The Thakur dalan, located across the main courtyard, houses the family deity Shreedhar Jiu, who is also referred to as Narayana.

== Restoration ==
In the early 2010s, parts of the Rajbari, which is spread over 20 acres, was converted into a heritage homestay. Dhruba Narayan Kundu returned to Itachuna after spending nearly three decades in the United States. Along with Rabindra Narayan and Basav Narayan Kundu, he restored the property in association with Mylestones & Journeys, to preserve the historic property and promote tourism in the surrounding village.

=== Tourism ===
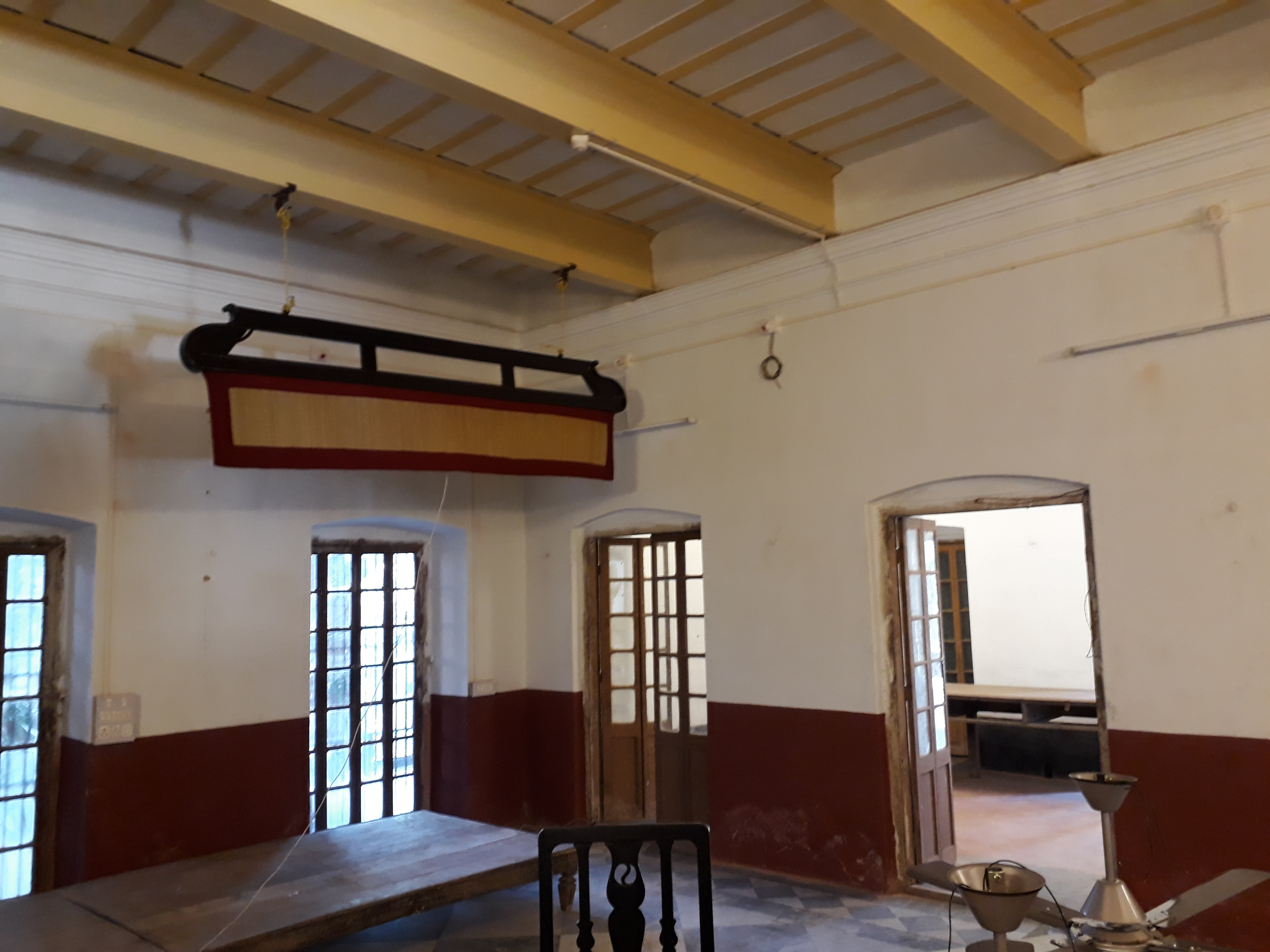
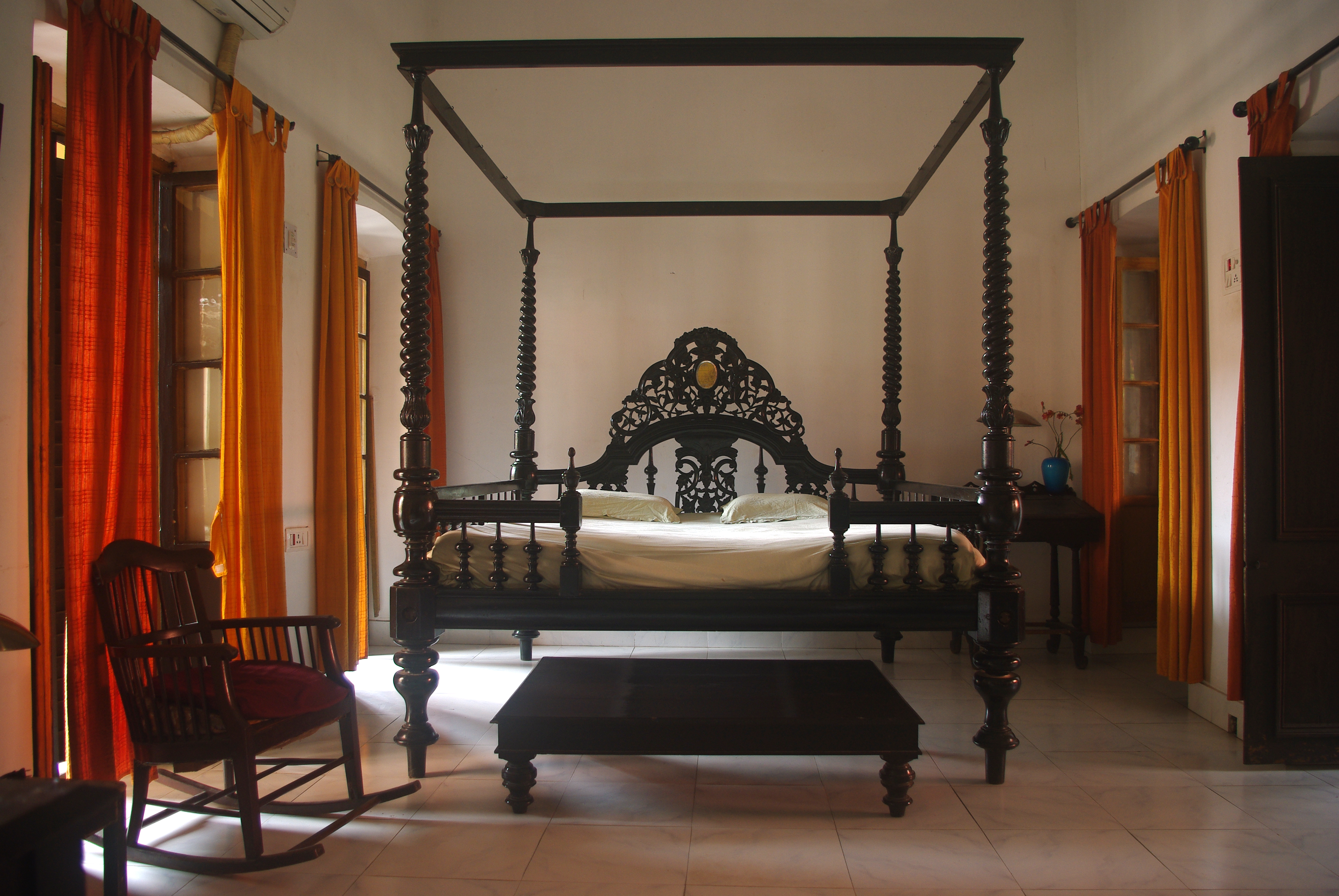
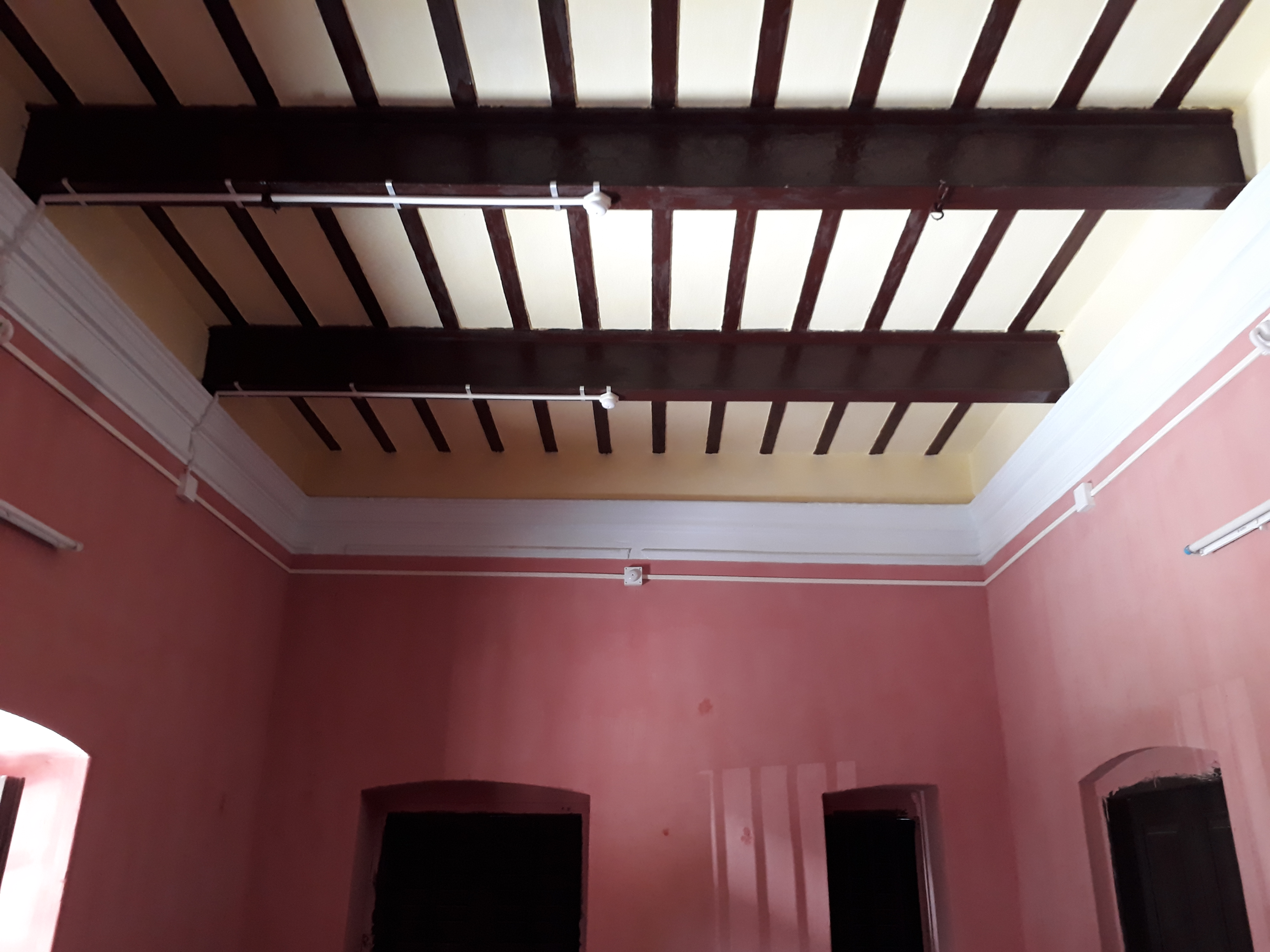
The interiors of the Rajbari

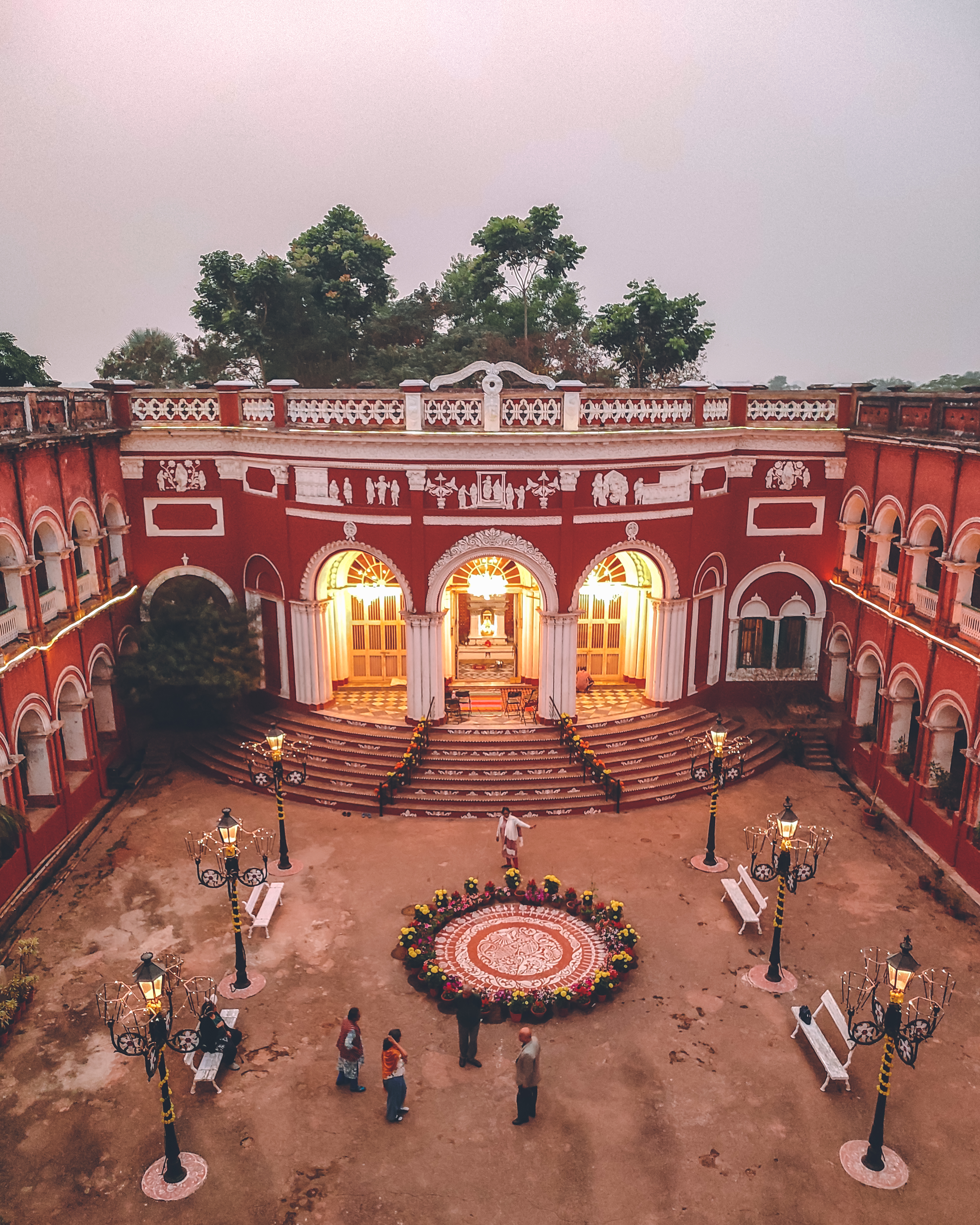
The thakurdalan during the Sandhya arati

The Rajbari provides around 14 rooms for accommodation, which are furnished with vintage furniture. The rooms are named after members of a traditional Bengali joint family — Boro Boudi, Choto Boudi, Thakuma, Boro Pishi, Ginni Maa, Boro Maa, Mejo Maa, Bilash Manjari, Kaka Babu, Jyatha Moshai, Choto Pishi and Bordi.

The property serves meals in traditional bell-metal utensils and include both vegetarian and non-vegetarian Bengali dishes.

The property offers guided tours of the palace. The property also includes mud huts and, several domestic birds and animals to represent a rural setting. Visitors can stay at the Rajbari or in cottages located behind the main building.

The property offers various activities for visitors, including various indoor games and outdoor sports, rural musical programmes, summer camps and day outings. Barbecues and bonfires are organised during winter, along with night walks.

== Popular culture ==
The Rajbari served as a filming location for the 2013 Hindi film Lootera starring Ranveer Singh and Sonakshi Sinha. In the film, it was used to portray a princely estate. The property has also been used for other film and television productions, including the Bengali films Rajmohol (2005), Paran Jai Jaliya Re (2009) and Goynar Baksho (2013). But around 2015, the owners stopped allowing film shoots because of the difficulties involved and concerns about damage to the property.
