= Itachuna =

- Village
- Location in West Bengal, India Itachuna (India)
- Coordinates: 23.0352°N 88.3093°E
- Country: India
- State: West Bengal
- District: Hooghly

Population (2011)
  - Total: 1,451

Languages
  - Official: Bengali, English
- Time zone: UTC+5:30 (IST)
- Telephone/STD code: 03454
- Lok Sabha constituency: Hooghly
- Vidhan Sabha constituency: Pandua
- Website: hooghly.gov.in

Itachuna is a village and Itachuna-Khanyan is a gram panchayat in Pandua CD Block in Chinsurah subdivision of Hooghly district in the state of West Bengal, India.

== Demographics ==
As per the 2011 Census of India, Itachuna had a total population of 1,451 of which 735 (51%) were males and 716 (49%) were females. Population below 6 years was 146. The total number of literates in Itachuna was 1,034 (79.23% of the population over 6 years).

== Transport ==
A short stretch of Polba-Khanyan Road links Itachuna to SH 13/ GT Road. The nearest railway station is Khanyan railway station.

== Education ==
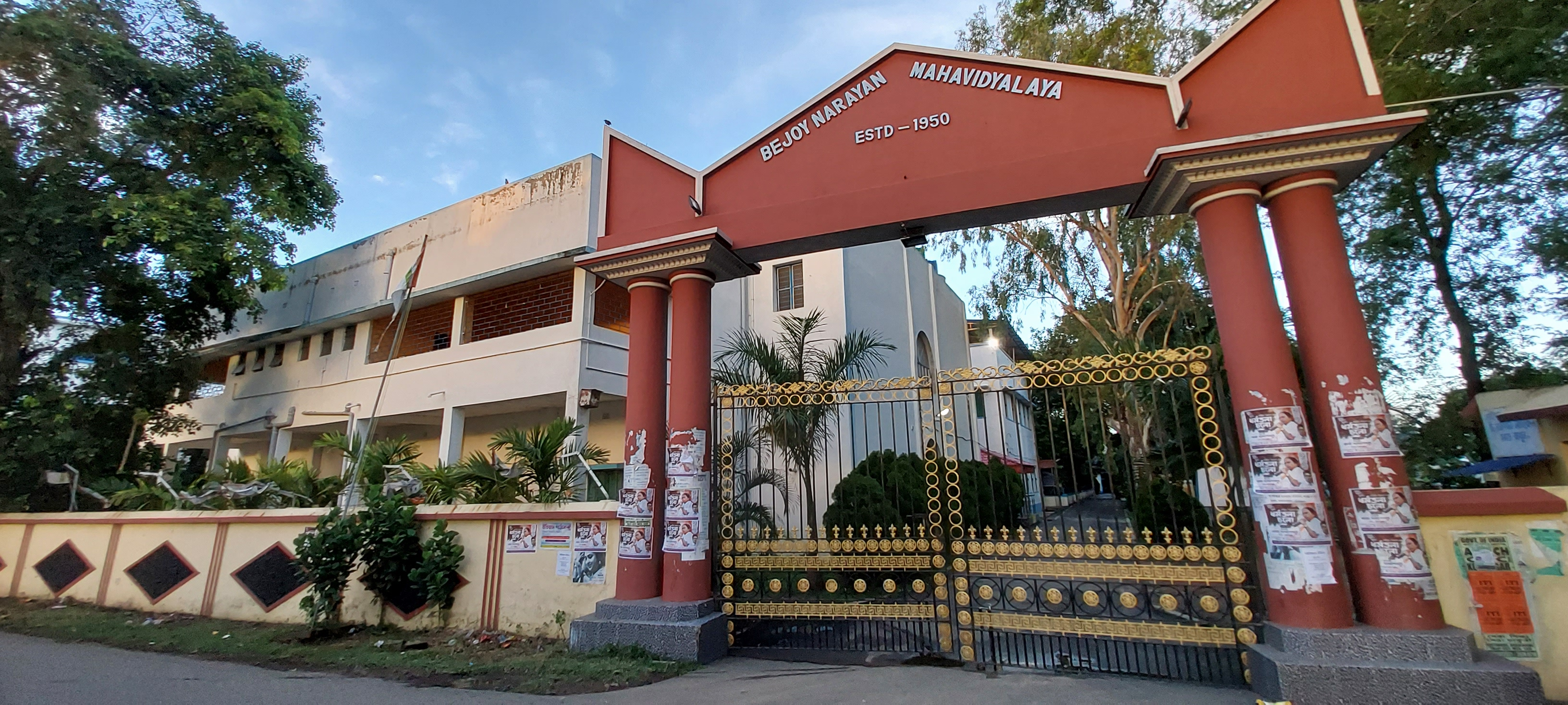
Bejoy Narayan Mahavidyalaya at Itachuna

Bejoy Narayan Mahavidyalaya, a general degree college, was established at Itachuna in 1950. It is affiliated with the University of Burdwan and offers honours courses in Bengali, English, Sanskrit, history, political science, philosophy, economics, mathematics, physics, chemistry, botany, zoology and nutrition.

== Culture ==
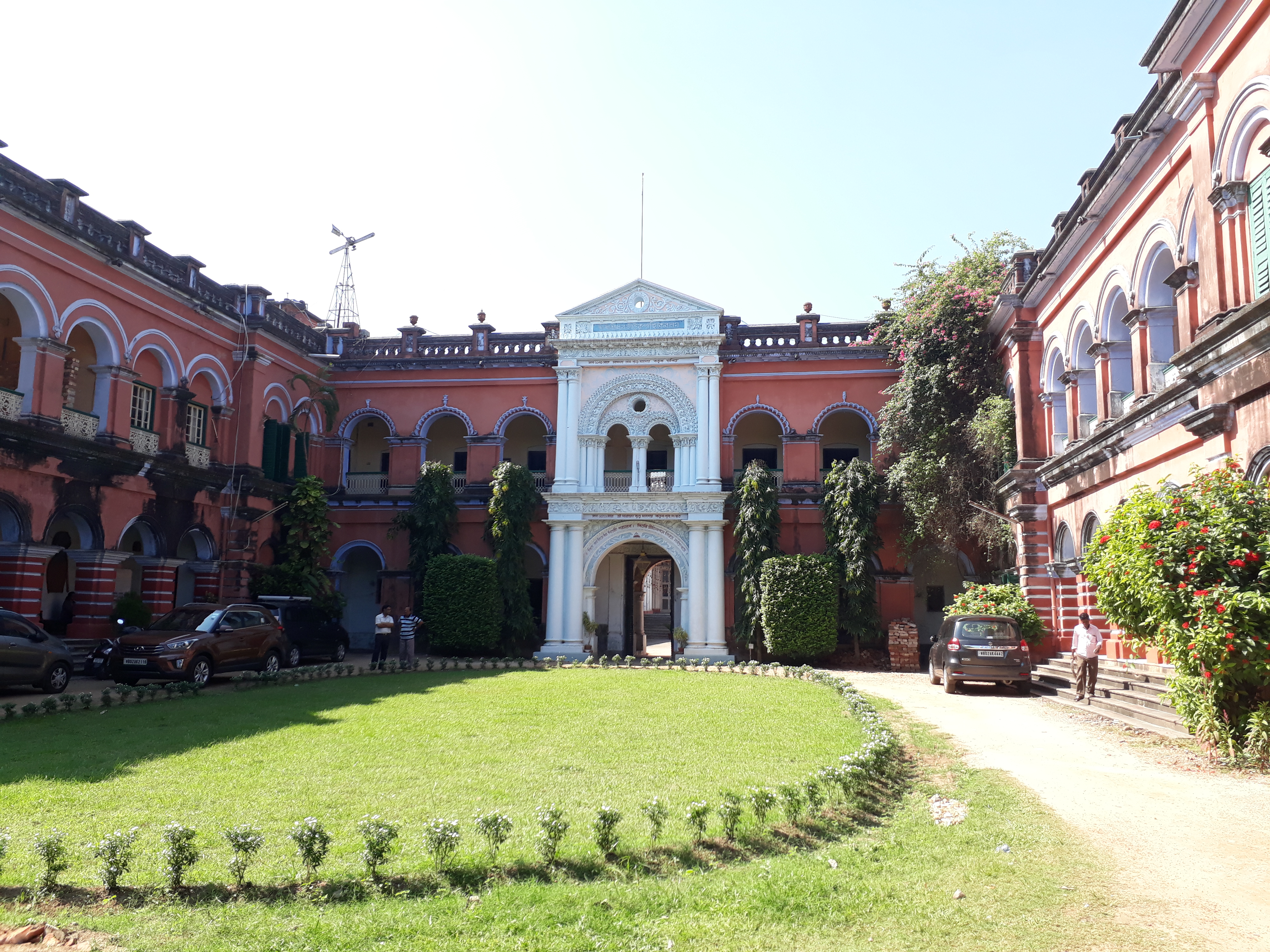
Itachuna Rajbari

Itachuna Rajbari also known as "Bargee Danga" became a tourist spot of Hooghly district. This was established by Kundan family originated from Maratha in 1766. Now the palace has been transformed into a heritage hotel. It is known for being the shooting location of many Hindi and Bengali films like Lootera, Poran Jaye Jolia Re, Rajmohol etc.

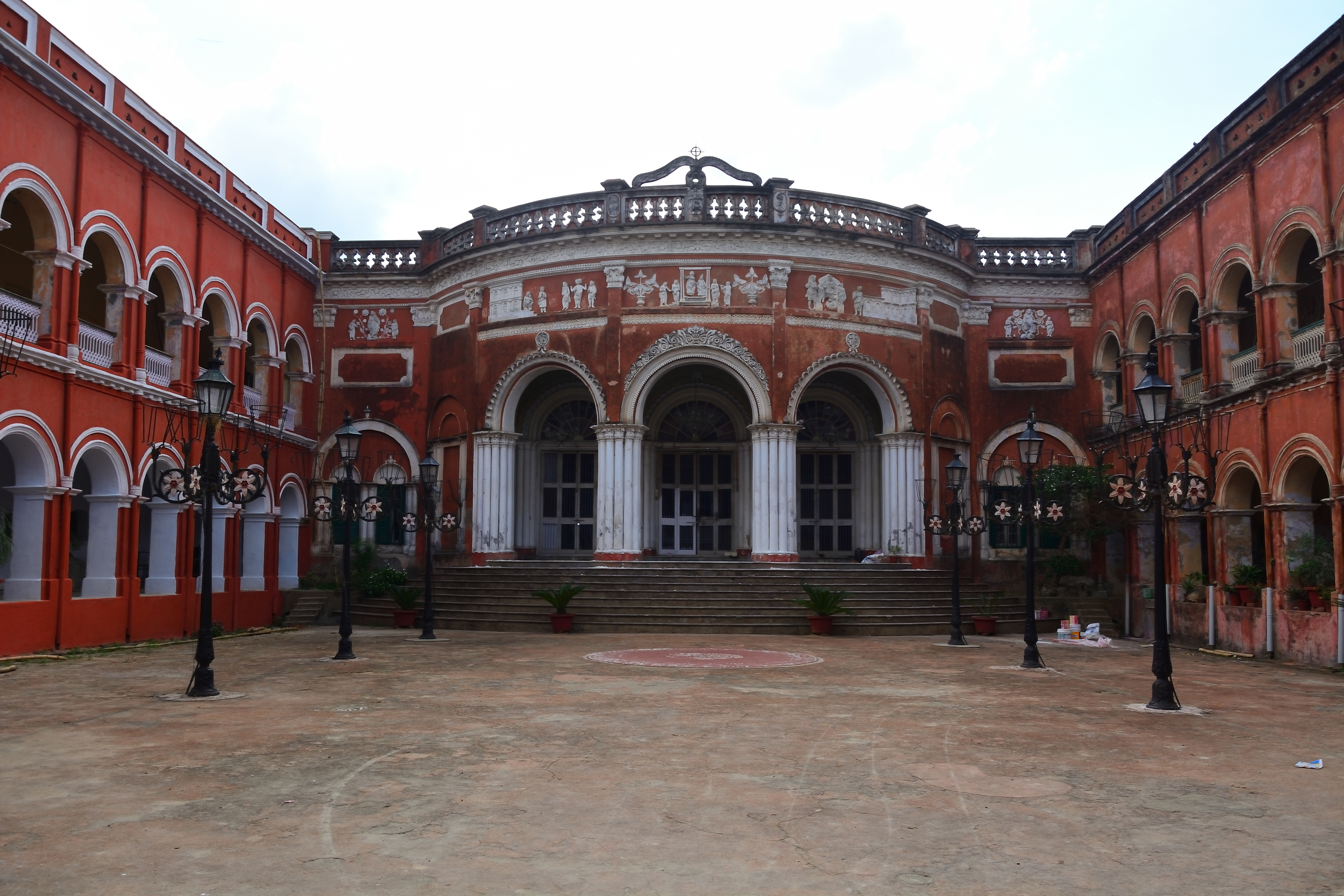
Itachuna Rajbari
