= Pandua, Hooghly =

Pandua
- Census Town
- Location in West Bengal, India Pandua (India)
- Coordinates: 23.08°N 88.28°E
- Country: India
- State: West Bengal
- District: Hooghly
- Elevation: 19 m (62 ft)

Population (2011)
  - Total: 30,700

Languages
  - Official: Bengali, English
- Time zone: UTC+5:30 (IST)
- PIN: 712149
- Vehicle registration: WB
- Lok Sabha constituency: Hooghly
- Vidhan Sabha constituency: Pandua

Pandua (Bengali: পাণ্ডুয়া) is a census town in the Pandua CD block in the Chinsurah subdivision of the Hooghly district in the Indian state of West Bengal.

== Geography ==
Cities and towns in the Chinsurah subdivision (except Polba Dadpur and Dhaniakhali CD Blocks) in Hooghly district
M: municipal city/ town, CT: census town, R: rural/ urban centre,
Owing to space constraints in the small map, the actual locations in a larger map may vary slightly

=== Location ===
Pandua is located at 23.08°N 88.28°E. It has an average elevation of 19 metres (62 feet).

Pandua, Purusattompur and Namajgram form a cluster of census towns.

Pandua CD block is a flat alluvial plain, known as the Hooghly-Damodar Plain, that forms part of the Gangetic Delta.

The place is best known for its minar and the ruins of Pandu Raja's Palace where all important state ceremonies were held. The 13th-century minar is 38 metres (125 ft) high.

== History ==
According to Binoy Ghosh, the tall Pandua Minar can be seen by those travelling in trains or along the Grand Trunk Road. It is locally said that Shah Sufiuddin defeated the Hindu king of the Pandua and Mahanad area and built this victory pillar. Mahiuddin Ostagar of Santipur composed a poem, Panduar Kechha, in which he describes how Muslim domination of the area was achieved. There was a king named Pandu in Pandua. Inside his palace there was a well blessed by the gods. When the body of a dead person was immersed in its waters, the person regained life. During the reign of king Pandu, mostly Hindus lived in Pandua, and there were a few Muslims. One day a Muslim peasant killed a cow on his son's birthday. This enraged the Hindus and they killed the son. The Muslim peasant complained to king Pandu but he did not take any action. The peasant carried the dead body of his son to the Badshah at Delhi, Feroze Shah. After listening to the complaint, he sent his nephew, Shah Sufi, at the head of an army, to Pandua. He waged war but initially he was unsuccessful, because of the life-giving properties of the divine well. Frustrated Shah Sufi was almost on the verge of returning to Delhi, when a cowherd boy revealed the secret of the divine well to Shah Sufi. The boy, dressed as a yogi, entered the palace and threw some beef into the well, thereby destroying its divine properties. The Muslim forces captured Pandua, and Shah Sufi remained back in Pandua. He built a large mosque there.

Historically, there is no evidence of the existence of king Pandu, but there were many minor Hindu kings in the Saptagram-Pandua area. Within a century of Bakhtiyar Khilji's conquest, the Muslim thrust into the southern parts of the Rarh region, that included the present-day Hooghly district, started from the end of the 13th century to the 14th century. It was during the rule of the Balban sultans in Delhi (1286–1328) that efforts were made to establish Islam, not only by capturing the thrones and political power, but also by establishing Islam socially.

According to the available records, Zafar Khan had come to the Tribeni area towards the end of the 13th century and Shah Sufiuddin had come to the Pandua area towards the beginning of the 14th century. During the period that followed Muslim Ghazis built many mosques and tombs on the ruins of Hindu temples. There is tell-tale evidence of the historical role of Muslim Ghazi-Pirs in the Pandua-Mahanad-Tribeni area.

== Demographics ==
According to the 2011 Census of India, Pandua had a total population of 30,700 of which 15,597 (51%) were males and 15,103 (49%) were females. Population in the age range 0–6 years was 2,986. The total number of literate persons in Pandua was 22,604 (81.56% of the population over 6 years).

As of 2001 India census, Pandua had a population of 27,126. Males constitute 51% of the population and females 49%. Pandua has an average literacy rate of 67%, higher than the national average of 59.5%: male literacy is 72%, and female literacy is 62%. In Pandua, 12% of the population is under 6 years of age.

== Civic administration ==
=== Police station ===
Pandua police station has jurisdiction over Pandua CD block.

=== CD block HQ ===
The headquarters of Pandua CD block are located at Pandua.

== Economy ==
This is a rich agricultural area with several cold storages.

S.R.Industry, manufacturer of construction and agricultural machinery was established at Pandua in 1996.

== Healthcare ==
Pandua has a rural hospital (with 30 beds).

== Transport ==
- State Highway 13/ GT Road passes through Pandua.
- Pundooah railway station situated on Howrah-Bardhaman main line.

== Visitor attractions ==
Bari Masjid
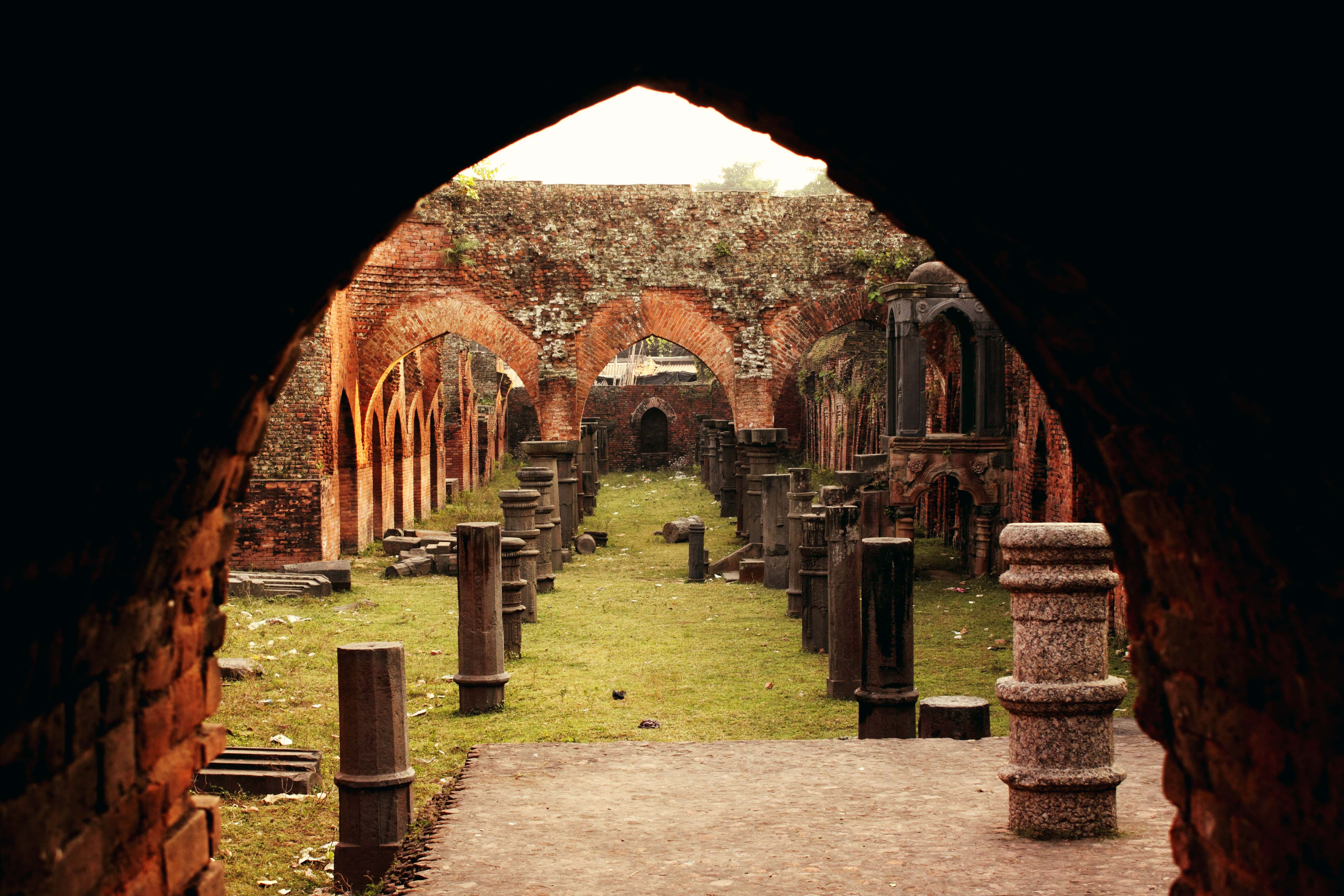
- The former mosque, in 2013

- Location of the former mosque in West Bengal

Religion
- Affiliation: Islam (former)
- Ecclesiastical or organisational status: Mosque (former)
- Status: Inactive (as a mosque); Partial ruinous state

Location
- Location: Pandua, Hooghly, West Bengal
- Country: India
- Administration: Archaeological Survey of India

Architecture
- Type: Mosque architecture
- Funded by: Shah Sufiuddin
- Completed: 14th century

Specifications
- Minaret: One (1477 CE)
- Minaret height: 38 m (125 ft)

Monument of National Importance
- Reference no.: N-WB-69

- Bari Masjid: The meaning of the bari is "the big mosque which shows the incredible architecture styled with Bricks". It was built by Shah Sufiuddin in 14th century.
- Pandua Minar: It was built by Shamsuddin Yusuf Shah in 1477 CE and it is a symbol of victory. Along with the Bari Masjid, it was built to replace the Srinkhala Devi temple which was destroyed by Shamsuddin Yusuf Shah.

== Gallery ==
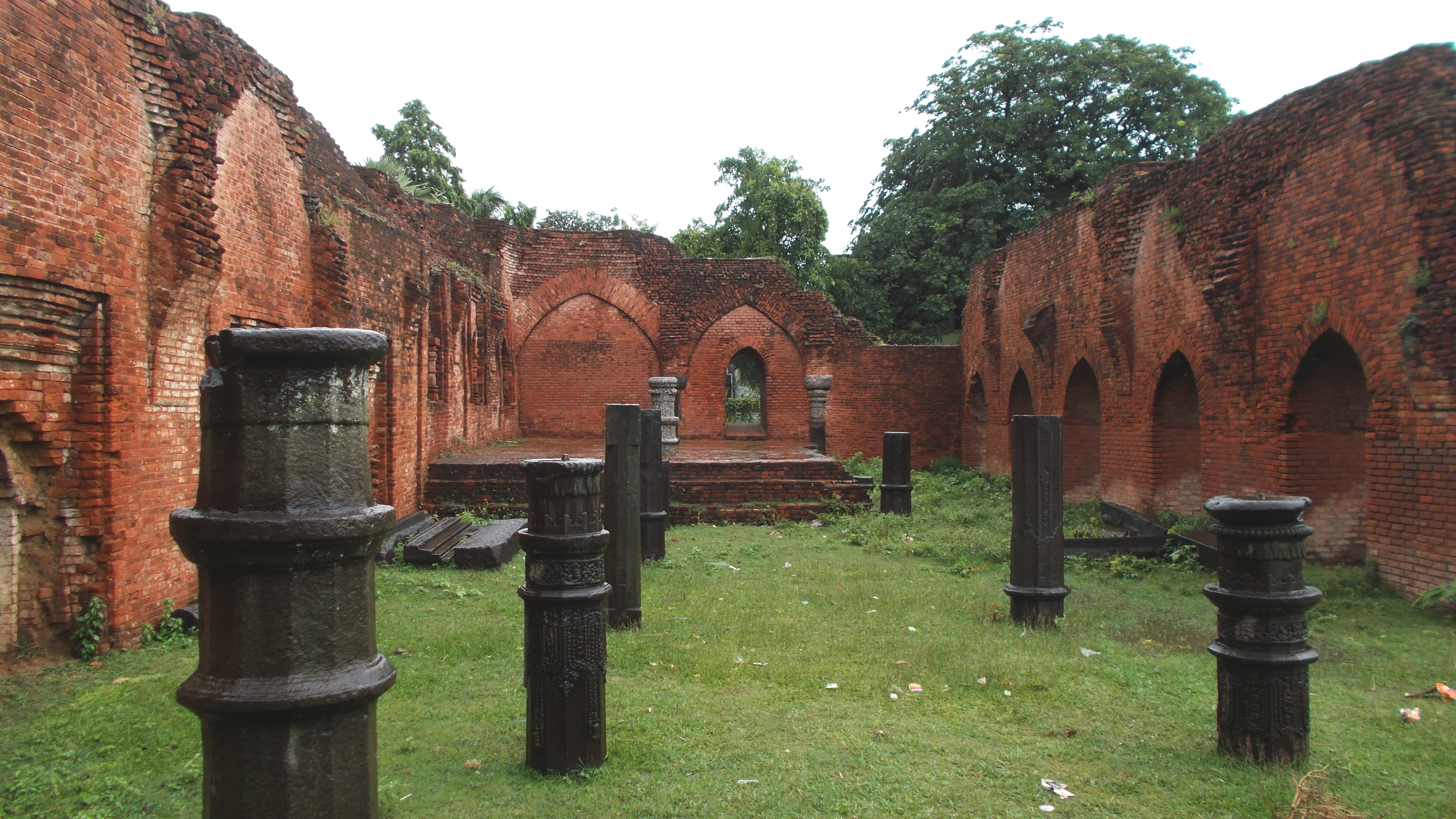
Bari masjid

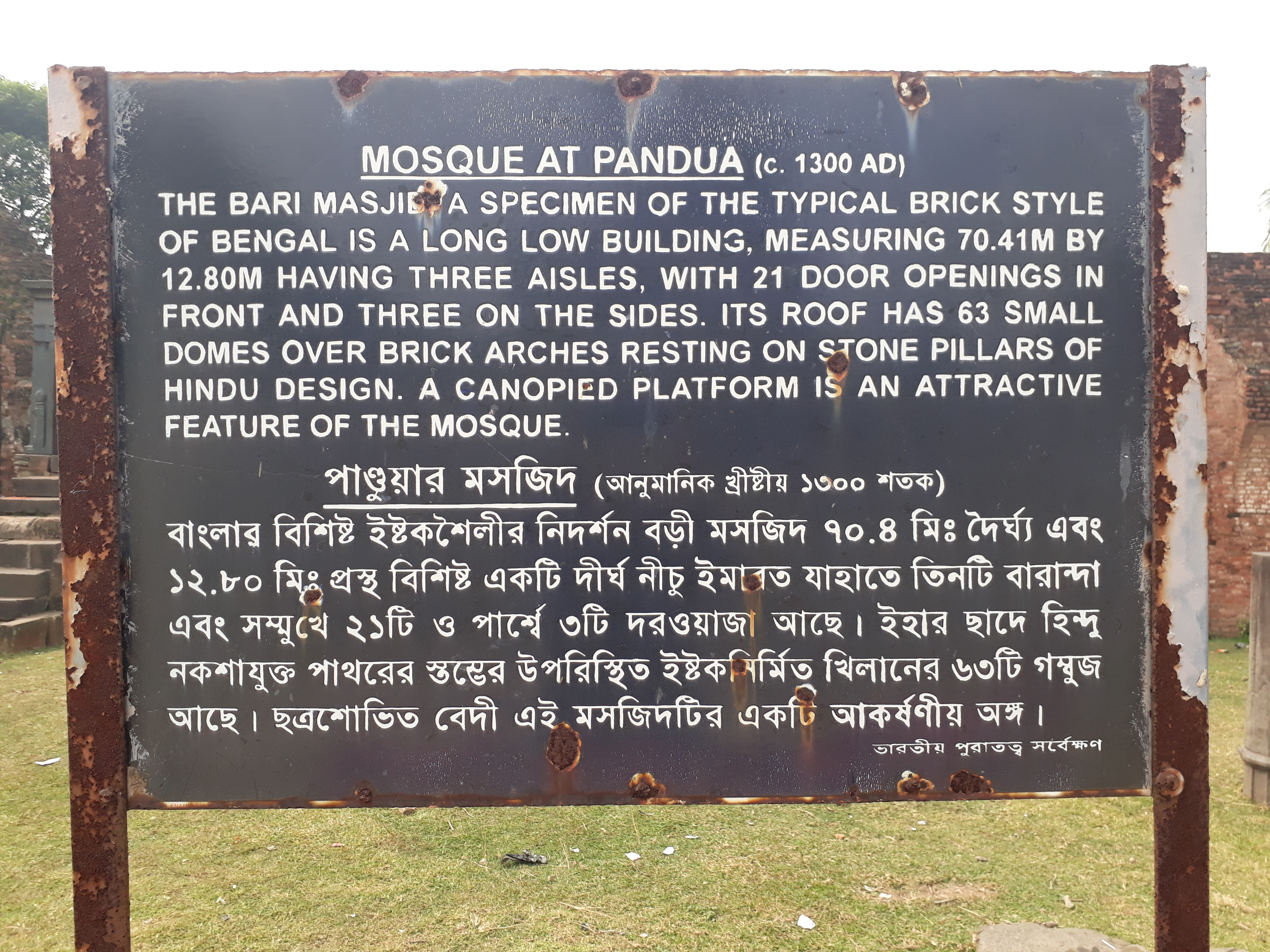
ASI Board of for the mosque

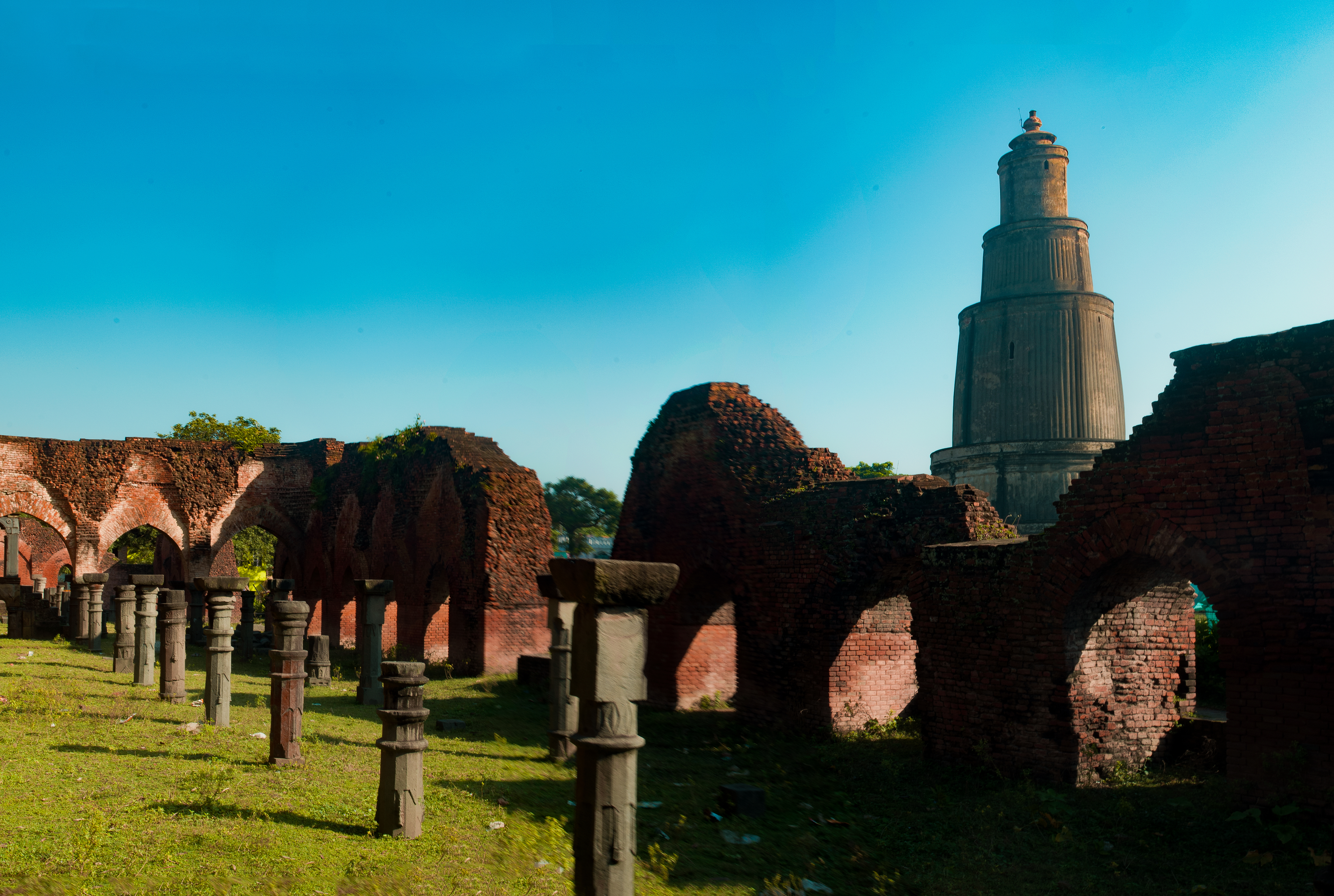
The minar in the distance

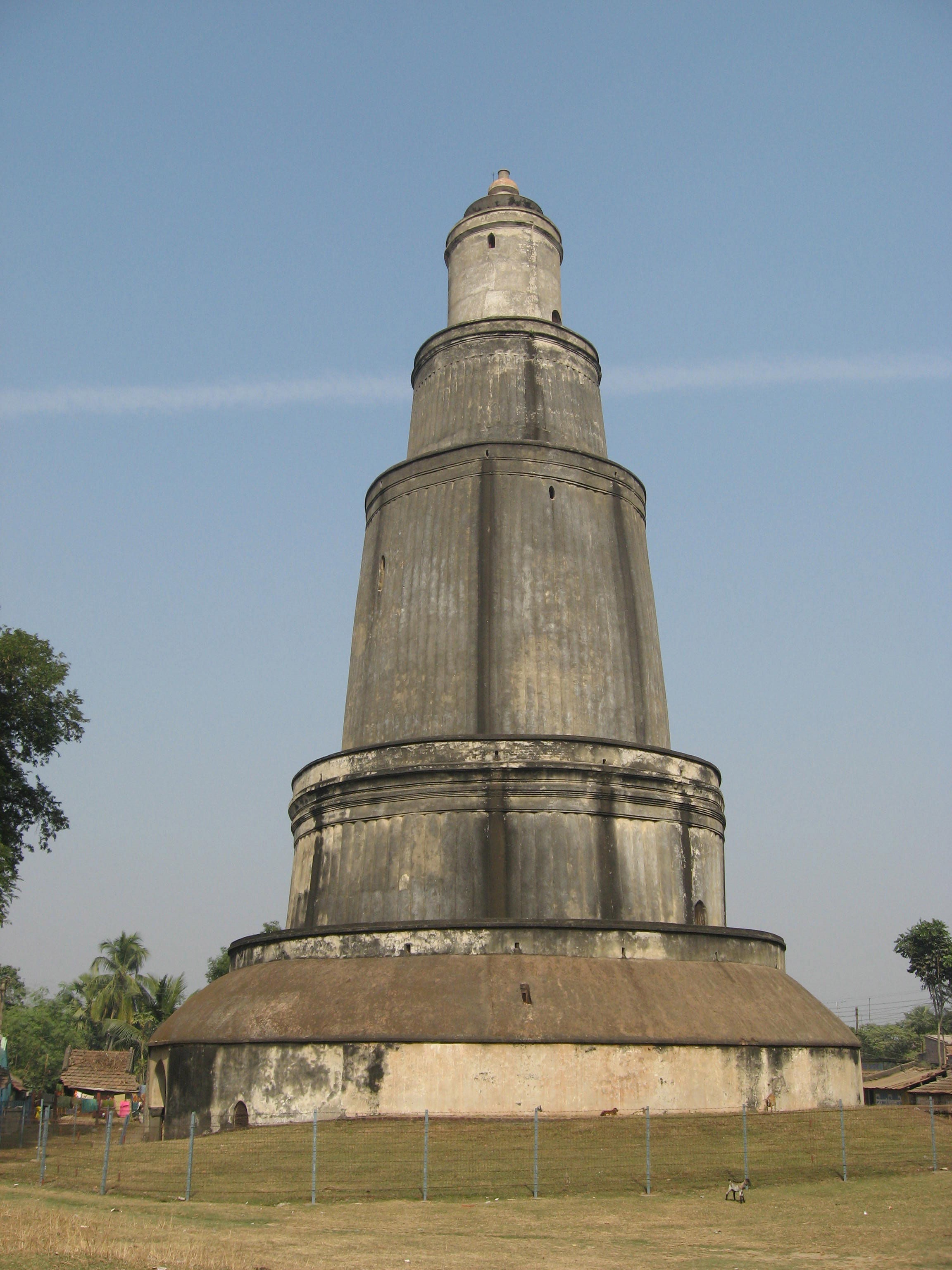
The minar

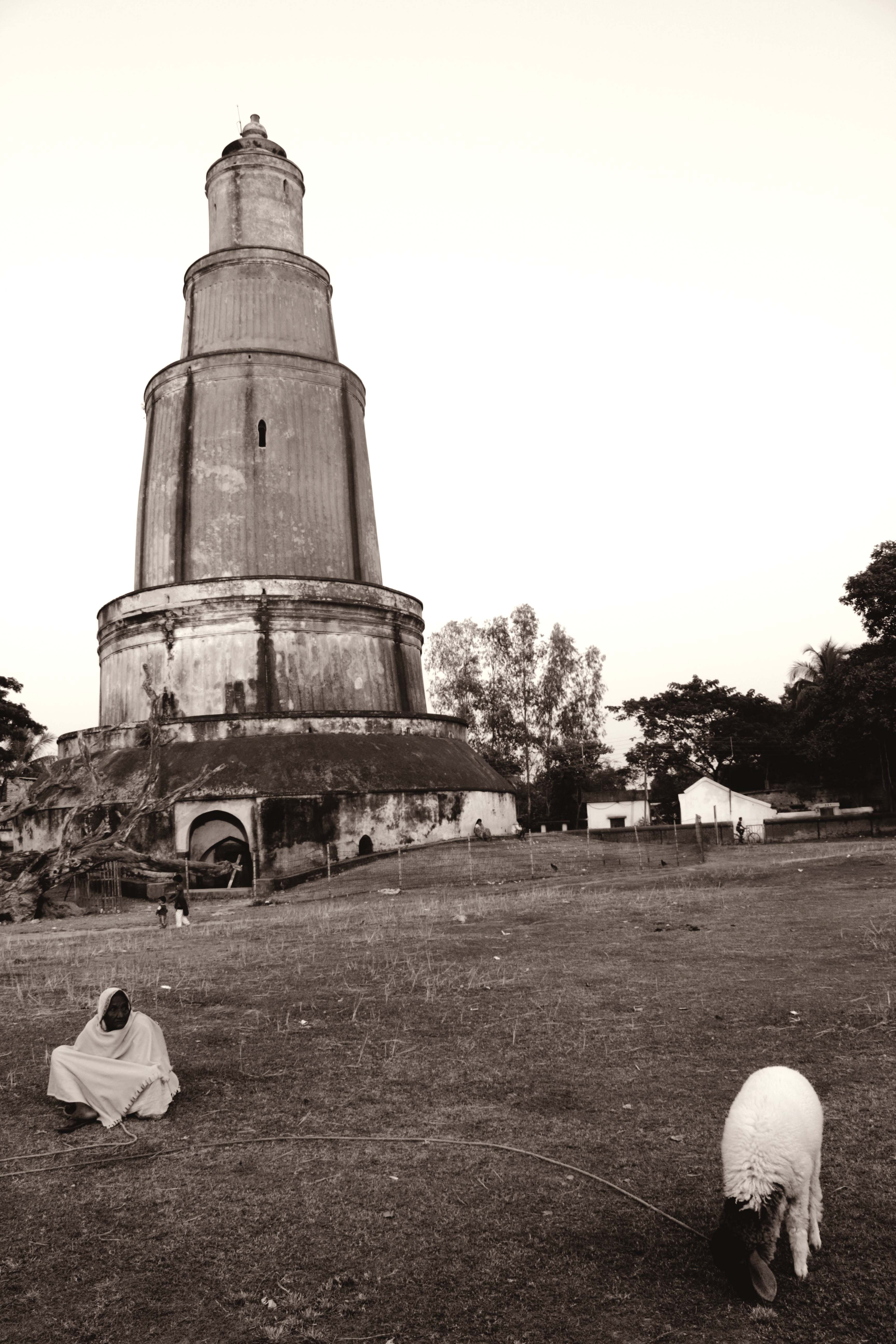
The minar

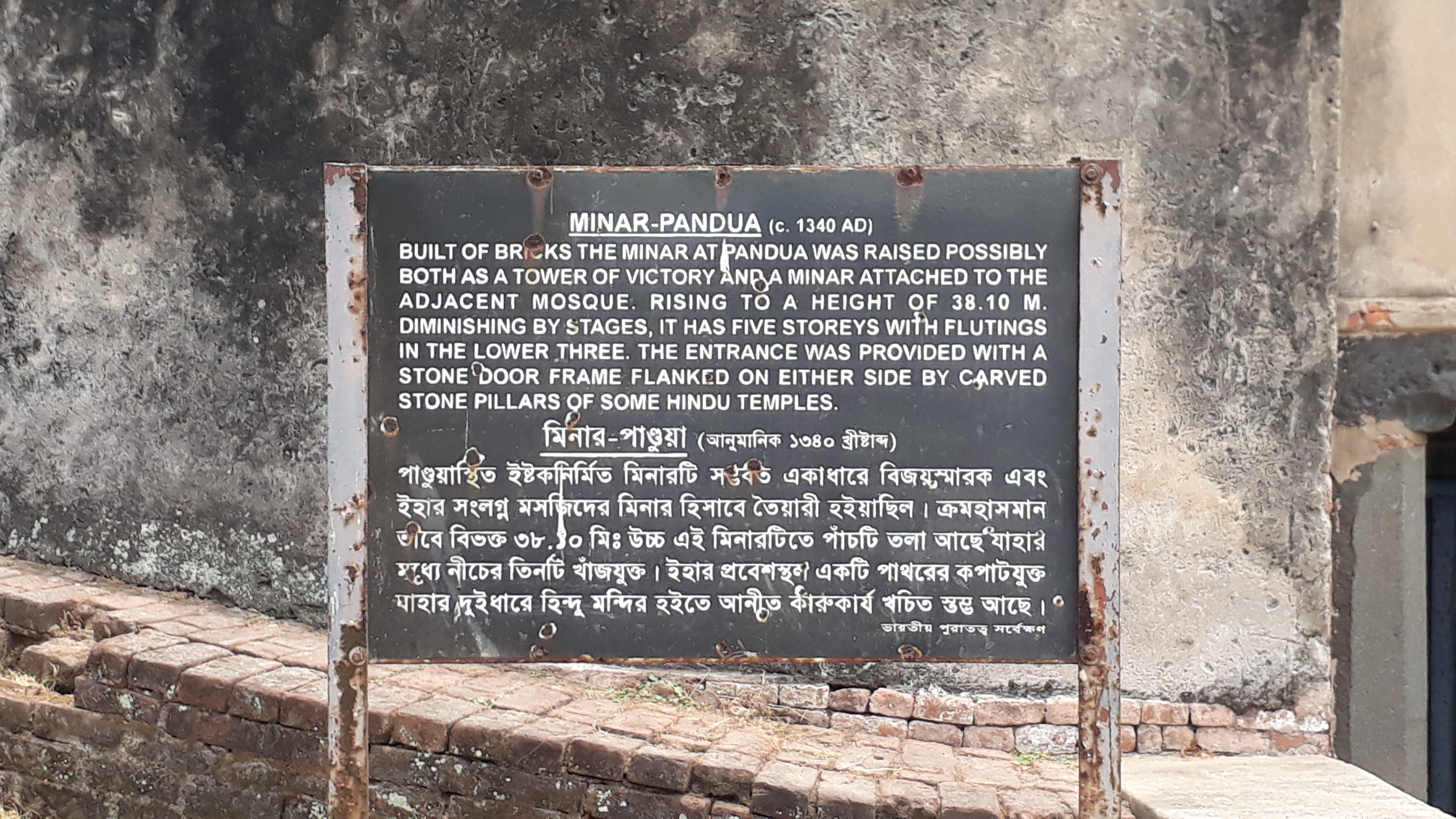
ASI Board for the minar

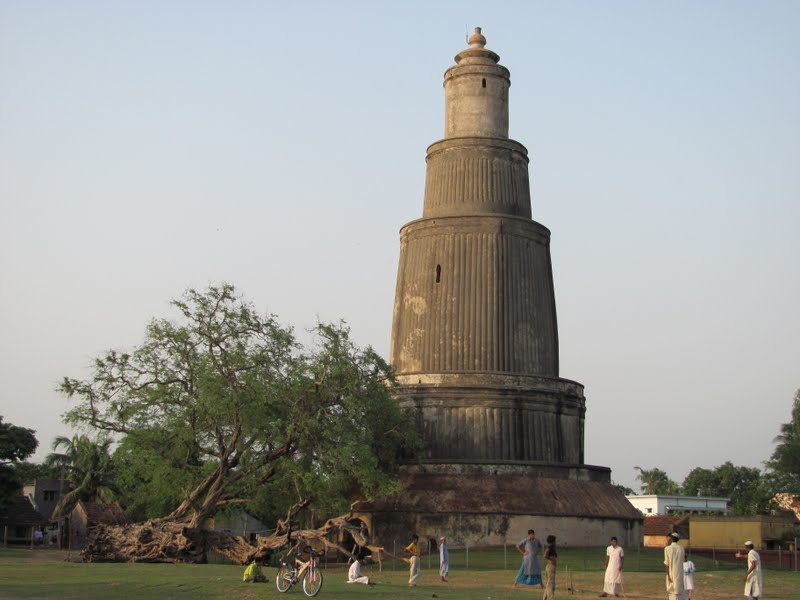
The minar

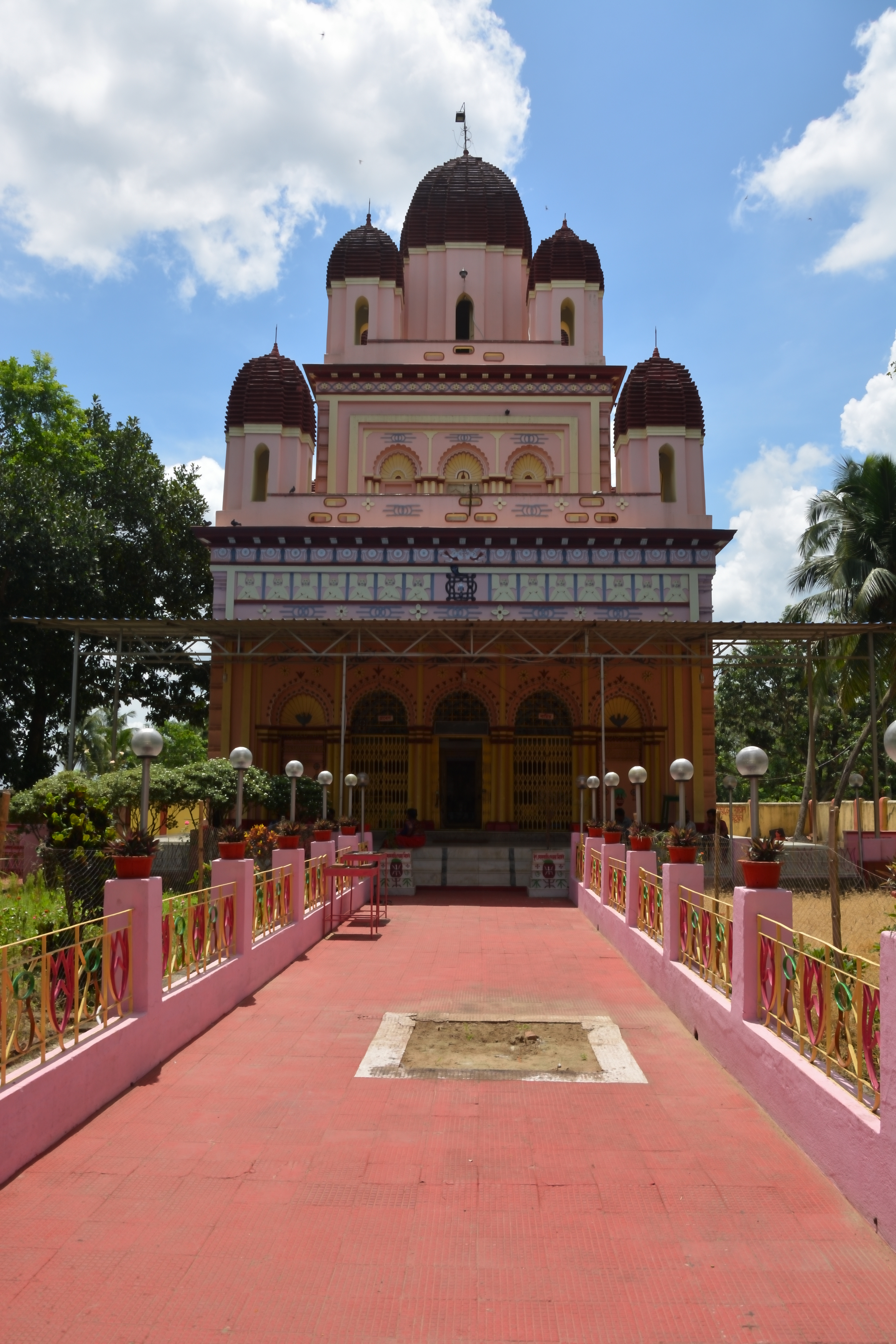
Mahanad Kali temple

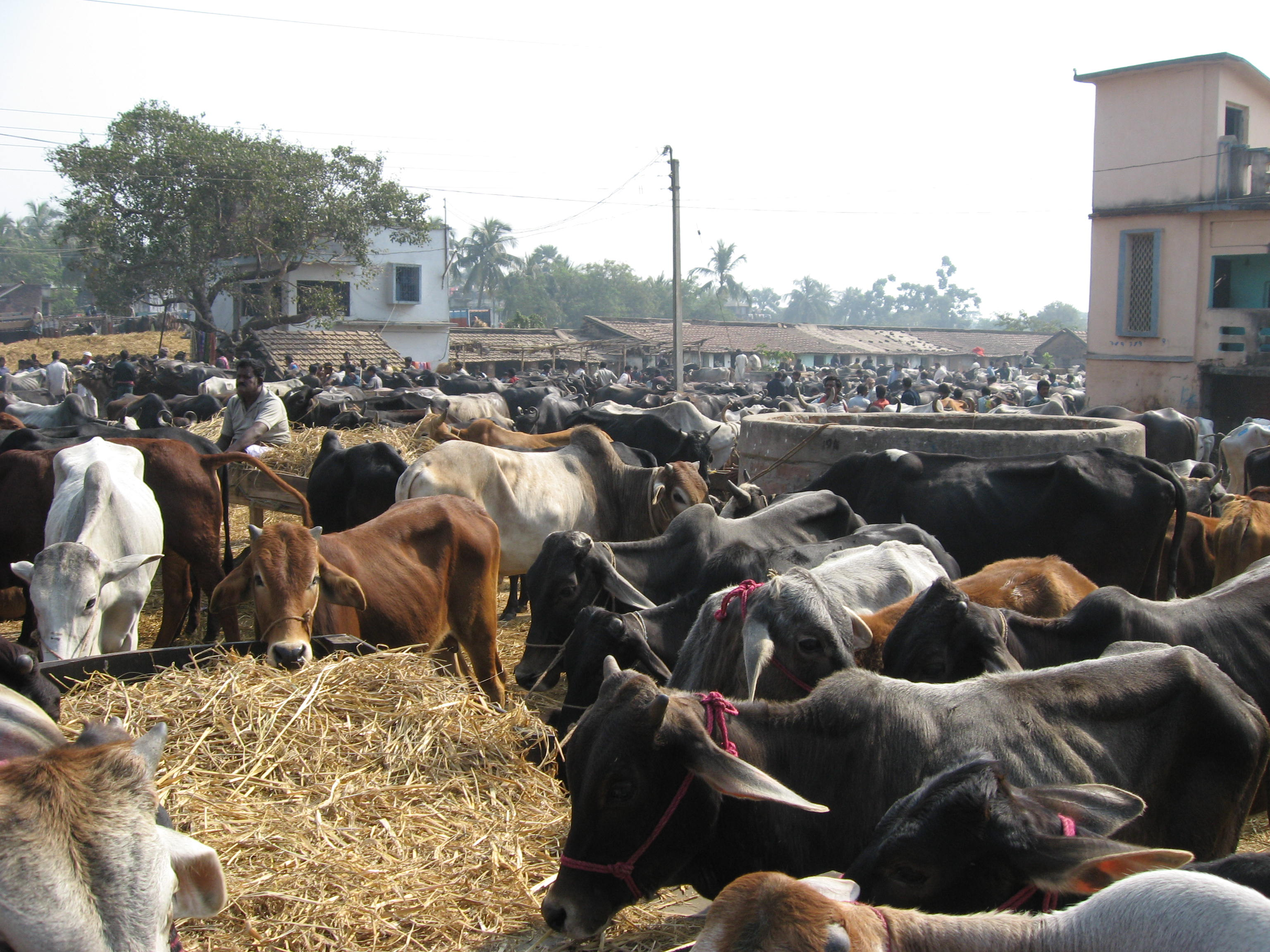
Cattle market
