= Pandua (community development block) =

- Community development block
- Interactive map of Pandua
- Coordinates: 23.08°N 88.28°E
- Country: India
- State: West Bengal
- District: Hooghly

Government
  - Type: Representative democracy

Area
  - Total: 276.43 km^{2} (106.73 sq mi)
- Elevation: 18 m (59 ft)

Population (2011)
  - Total: 316,197
  - Density: 1,143.9/km^{2} (2,962.6/sq mi)

Languages
  - Official: Bengali, English
- Time zone: UTC+5:30 (IST)
- PIN: 712134 (Boinchi); 712149 (Pandua)
- Area code: 03454
- Vehicle registration: WB-15, WB-16, WB-18
- Literacy: 75.86%
- Lok Sabha constituency: Hooghly
- Vidhan Sabha constituency: Pandua
- Website: hooghly.gov.in

Pandua is a community development block that forms an administrative division in Chinsurah subdivision of Hooghly district in the Indian state of West Bengal.

== Overview ==
Pandua CD Block is part of the Hooghly-Damodar Plain, one of the three natural regions in the district of the flat alluvial plains that forms part of the Gangetic Delta. The region has many depressions which receive water from the surrounding lands during the rainy season and discharge the water through small channels.

== Geography ==
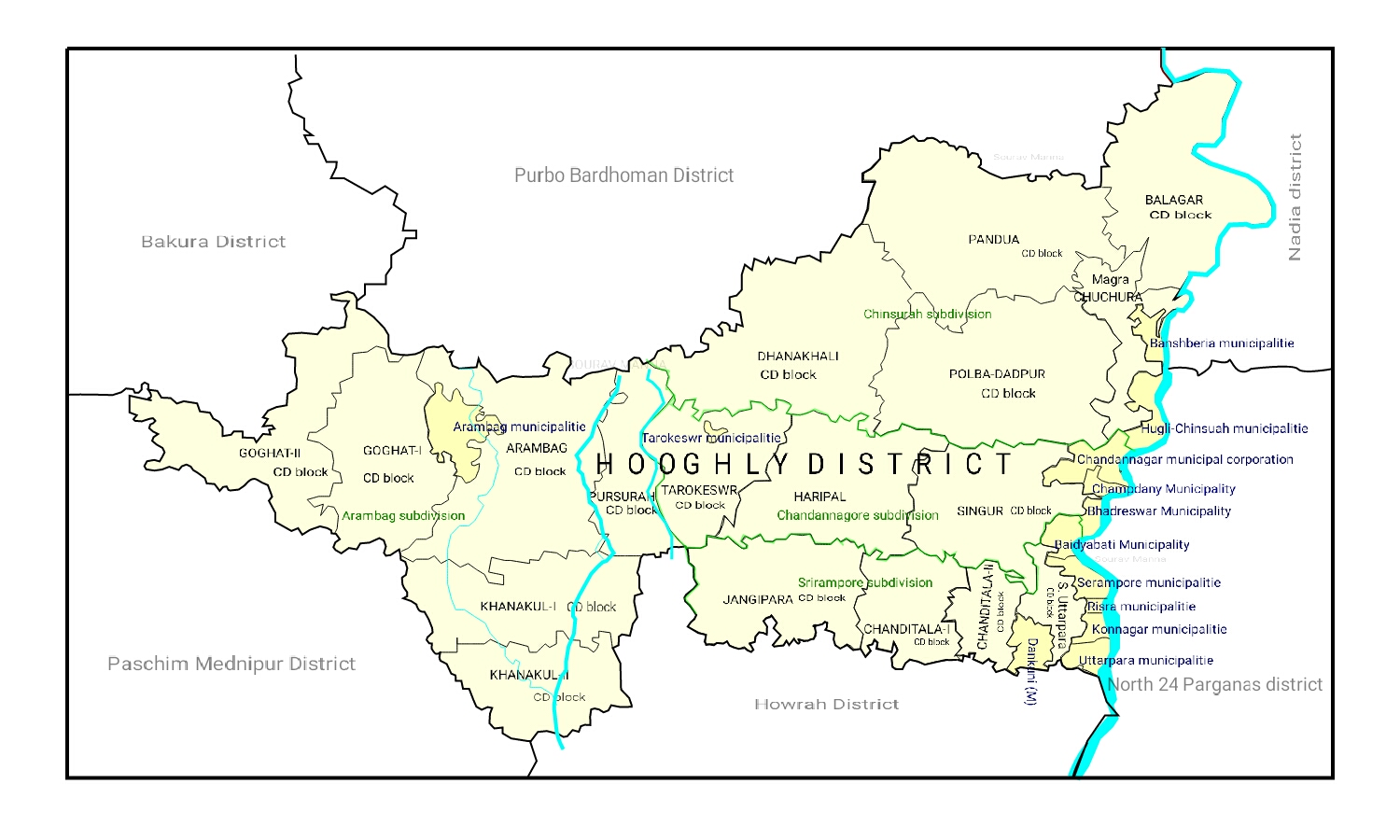
Map of Hooghly district showing CD blocks and municipal areas

Pandua CD block sowing GP areas

Pandua is located at 23°05′N 88°17′E.

Pandua CD Block is bounded by Kalna II CD Block, in Bardhaman district, in the north, Balagarh and Chinsurah Mogra CD Blocks the east, Polba Dadpur CD Block in the south and Dhaniakhali and Memari I CD Block, the latter in Bardhaman district, in the west.

It is located 27 km from Chinsurah, the district headquarters.

The Pandua CD Block has an area of 276.43 km^{2}. It has 1 panchayat samity, 16 gram panchayats, 247 gram sansads (village councils), 157 mouzas and 163 inhabited villages. Pandua police station serves this block. Headquarters of this CD Block is at Pandua.

Gram panchayats of Pandua block/ panchayat samiti are: Batika-Boinchee, Belun-Damasin, Berala-Konchmali, Haral-Daspur, Ilosova-Daspur, Itachuna-Khanyan, Jamgram-Mondalal, Jamna, Jayar-Dwarbasini, Khirkundi-Namajgram-Niala, Panchghora-Toregram, Pandua, Rameswarpur-Gopalnagar, Sarai-Tinna, Sikhara-Champta and Simlagarh-Vitasin.

== Demographics ==
=== Population ===
As per 2011 Census of India Pandua CD Block had a total population of 316,197, of which 265,863 were rural and 50,334 were urban. There were 159,323 (50%) males and 156,874 (50%) females. Population below 6 years was 31,838. Scheduled Castes numbered 101,302 (32.04%) and Scheduled Tribes numbered 48,555 (15.36%).

As per 2001 census, Pandua block had a total population of 283,004, out of which 142,487 were males and 140,517 were females. Pandua block registered a population growth of 16.12 per cent during the 1991-2001 decade. Decadal growth for Hooghly district was 15.72 per cent. Decadal growth in West Bengal was 17.84 per cent.

Census Towns in Pandua CD Block (2011 census figures in brackets): Batika (8,717), Pandua (30,700), Purusattompur (3,665) and Namajgram (7,252).

Large villages (with 4,000+ population) in Pandua CD Block (2011 census figures in brackets): Berela (6,712), Bainchi (13,063), Sarai (4,043), Tinna (6,131), Champahati (6,128), Pontba (4,237), Haral (4,521), Rameswarpur (4,821), Dwarbasini (5,256), Khanyan (9,575) and Ilchobi (4,136).

Other villages in Pandua CD Block include (2011 census figures in brackets): Daspur (2,088), Belun (3,257), Itachuna (1,451), Gopalnagar (2,807), Jamgram (2,753), Torgram (2,467) and Panchgara (1,919).

=== Literacy ===
As per the 2011 census the total number of literates in Pandua CD Block was 215,701 (75.86% of the population over 6 years) out of which males numbered 117,603 (82.22% of the male population over 6 years) and females numbered 98,098 (69.41% of the female population over 6 years). The gender disparity (the difference between female and male literacy rates) was 12.81%. As per the 2001 census, Pandua block had a total literacy of 47.34 per cent. While male literacy was 66.05 per cent, female literacy was 58.35 per cent.

See also – List of West Bengal districts ranked by literacy rate

Literacy in CD blocks of
Hooghly district
Arambagh subdivision
Arambagh – 79.10
Khanakul I – 77.73
Khanakul II – 79.16
Goghat I – 78.70
Goghat II – 77.24
Pursurah – 82.12
Chandannagar subdivision
Haripal – 78.59
Singur – 84.01
Tarakeswar – 79.96
Chinsurah subdivision
Balagarh – 76.94
Chinsurah Mogra – 83.01
Dhaniakhali – 75.66
Pandua – 75.86
Polba Dadpur – 75.14
Srirampore subdivision
Chanditala I – 83.76
Chanditala II – 84.78
Jangipara – 75.34
Sreerampur Uttarpara – 87.33
Source: 2011 Census: CD Block Wise
Primary Census Abstract Data

=== Language and religion ===
Religion in Pandua CD block (2011)
Hinduism	68.48%
Islam	24.15%
Other (tribal religion)	6.65%
Other or not stated	0.72%

As per the 2011 census, majority of the population of the district belong to the Hindu community with a population share of 82.9% followed by Muslims at 15.8%. The percentage of the Hindu population of the district has followed a decreasing trend from 87.1% in 1961 to 82.9% in the latest census 2011. On the other hand, the percentage of Muslim population has increased from 12.7% in 1961 to 15.8% in 2011 census.

In 2011 census Hindus numbered 216,134 and formed 68.48% of the population in Pandua CD Block. Muslims numbered 76,357 and formed 24.15% of the population. Others numbered 23,006 and formed 7.27% of the population.

Languages of Pandua CD block (2011)
1. Bengali (84.1%)
2. Santali (11.4%)
3. Hindi (3.26%)
4. Others (1.23%)

At the time of the 2011 census, 84.06% of the population spoke Bengali, 11.45% Santali and 3.26% Hindi as their first language.

== Administration ==
=== Zilla Parishad ===
Pandua CD Block has 3 Zilla Parishad seats. The latest elections were held in July 2023 where the Trinamool Congress won all 3 seats.

Zilla Parishad	ZP No.	Councillor	Party	Remarks
Pandua	19	Manas Majumder	Trinamool Congress	
Pandua	20	Fulmani Murmu	Trinamool Congress	
Pandua	21	Lalit Kshetrapal	Trinamool Congress	

=== Panchayat Samiti ===
Pandua Panchayat Samiti has 48 divisions. The latest elections were held in July 2023 where the Trinamool Congress by winning a landslide majority of 43 wards against CPI(M)'s 4 and BJP's 1.

Chairperson: Maina Majhi
Deputy Chairperson: Somnath Paul
Gram Panchayat	No.	Councillor	Party	Remarks
Berela-Konchmali	1	Durga Tudu	Trinamool Congress	
Berela-Konchmali	2	Shyamal Bag	Trinamool Congress	
Berela-Konchmali	3	Maumita Dhali	Trinamool Congress	
Jamna	4	Prasenjit Kshetrapal	Trinamool Congress	
Jamna	5	Shibani Hansda Mandi	Trinamool Congress	
Jamna	6	Soumen Kshetrapal	Communist Party of India (Marxist)	
Bantika-Boinchi	7	Sanchita Mukhopadhyay	Trinamool Congress	
Bantika-Boinchi	8	Tapasi Digar	Trinamool Congress	
Bantika-Boinchi	9	Sanjit Banerjee	Trinamool Congress	
Haral-Daspur	10	Sumanta Saren	Trinamool Congress	
Haral-Daspur	11	Pramita Pramanik	Trinamool Congress	
Haral-Daspur	12	Tanusree Bodhak	Trinamool Congress	
Rameswarpur-Gopalnagar	13	Nimai Narayan Kshetrapal	Trinamool Congress	
Rameswarpur-Gopalnagar	14	Kohinur Khatun Bibi	Trinamool Congress	
Rameswarpur-Gopalnagar	15	Sanjay Murmu	Trinamool Congress	
Simlagarh-Vitasin	16	Kanan Mondal	Trinamool Congress	
Simlagarh-Vitasin	17	Nishapati Rakshit	Trinamool Congress	
Simlagarh-Vitasin	18	Rakesh Majhi	Trinamool Congress	
Sarai-Tinna	19	Sushama Dakua	Bharatiya Janata Party	
Sarai-Tinna	20	Anisul Islam Molla	Trinamool Congress	
Sarai-Tinna	21	Mousumi Dutta	Trinamool Congress	
Panchgora-Torgram	22	Mohammad Nurussuba	Trinamool Congress	
Panchgora-Torgram	23	Purnima Karmakar	Trinamool Congress	
Panchgora-Torgram	24	Renufa Yasmin	Trinamool Congress	
Jamgram-Mondalai	25	Nila Baske	Communist Party of India (Marxist)	
Jamgram-Mondalai	26	Kanan Tudu	Trinamool Congress	
Jamgram-Mondalai	27	Birajendra Nath Chowdhury	Trinamool Congress	
Ilchoba-Daspur	28	Mamataj Khatun	Trinamool Congress	
Ilchoba-Daspur	29	Subhasish Mondal	Trinamool Congress	
Ilchoba-Daspur	30	Sheikh Nawsar Ali	Trinamool Congress	
Sikhira-Champta	31	Shibani Hansda	Trinamool Congress	
Sikhira-Champta	32	Maina Majhi	Trinamool Congress	
Sikhira-Champta	33	Sheikh Nasiruddin	Trinamool Congress	
Itachuna-Khanyan	34	Baishali Ghosh Das	Trinamool Congress	
Itachuna-Khanyan	35	Ranjan Mondal	Communist Party of India (Marxist)	
Itachuna-Khanyan	36	Shibu Mondal	Trinamool Congress	
Belun-Dhamasin	37	Mamata Bauldas	Trinamool Congress	
Belun-Dhamasin	38	Chhaya Maitra	Trinamool Congress	
Belun-Dhamasin	39	Nabanita Bauldas	Trinamool Congress	
Jayer-Dwarbasini	40	Sheikh Ahammad Ali	Trinamool Congress	
Jayer-Dwarbasini	41	Sumita Ray	Trinamool Congress	
Jayer-Dwarbasini	42	Soumen Bauldas	Trinamool Congress	
Khirkundi-Namajgram-Niyala	43	Shipra Sharma	Trinamool Congress	
Khirkundi-Namajgram-Niyala	44	Tapas Ghosh	Trinamool Congress	
Khirkundi-Namajgram-Niyala	45	Sabita Pal	Trinamool Congress	
Pandua	46	Anal Kanti Chakraborty	Communist Party of India (Marxist)	
Pandua	47	Farida Khatun	Trinamool Congress	
Pandua	48	Somnath Paul	Trinamool Congress	

=== Gram Panchayats ===
Pandua Panchayat Samiti has 16 villages or gram panchayats. The latest elections were held in July 2023 where the Trinamool Congress won 14 villages, the CPI(M) won 2. The BJP was not able to gain majority in any panchayat.

No.	Gram Panchayat	Total Seats							Majority
No.	Gram Panchayat	Total Seats	AITC	BJP	SDA			Others	Majority
No.	Gram Panchayat	Total Seats	AITC	BJP	CPI(M)	INC	AIFB	Others	Majority
1	Berela-Konchmali	17	11	2	1	0		3	AITC
2	Jamna	11	4	0	7	0		0	CPI(M)
3	Bantika-Boinchi	25	19	2	4	0		0	AITC
4	Haral-Daspur	20	15	3	2	0		0	AITC
5	Rameswarpur-Gopalnagar	17	9	4	3	0		1	AITC
6	Simlagarh-Vitasin	28	16	6	3	0		3	AITC
7	Sarai-Tinna	23	17	3	0		2	1	AITC
8	Panchgora-Torgram	13	10	1	2	0		0	AITC
9	Jamgram-Mondalai	14	6	0	7	0		1	CPI(M)
10	Ilchoba-Daspur	16	11	3	2	0		0	AITC
11	Sikhira-Champta	14	8	2	4	0		0	AITC
12	Itachuna-Khanyan	22	10	0	8	3	0	1	AITC
13	Belun-Dhamasin	21	13	3	5	0		0	AITC
14	Jayer-Dwarbasini	18	13	1	4	0		0	AITC
15	Khirkundi-Namajgram-Niyala	20	15	0	4	0		1	AITC
16	Pandua	30	19	7	3	1	0	0	AITC
Total		309	196	37	59	4	2	11	

== Rural poverty ==
As per poverty estimates obtained from household survey for families living below poverty line in 2005, rural poverty in Pandua CD Block was 34.30%.

== Economy ==
=== Livelihood ===
Livelihood
in Pandua CD Block
1. Cultivators (11.8%)
2. Agricultural labourers (51.3%)
3. Household industries (3.80%)
4. Other Workers (33.0%)

In Pandua CD Block in 2011, amongst the class of total workers, cultivators formed 11.82%, agricultural labourers 51.33%, household industry workers 3.80% and other workers 33.05%.

=== Infrastructure ===
There are 153 inhabited villages in Pandua CD Block. 100% villages have power supply. 85 villages have more than one source of drinking water (tap, well, tube well, hand pump), 55 villages have only tube well/ borewell, 16 villages have only hand pump and 1 village has only well. 25 Villages have post offices, 16 villages have sub post offices and 12 villages have post and telegraph offices. 111 villages have landlines, 108 villages have public call offices and 124 villages have mobile phone coverage. 83 villages have pucca roads and 56 villages have bus service (public/ private). 37 villages have agricultural credit societies and 23 villages have commercial/ co-operative banks.

=== Agriculture ===
This is a rich agricultural area with several cold storages. Though rice is the prime crop of the district, the agricultural economy largely depends on potato, jute, vegetables, and orchard products. Though potato is cultivated in all the blocks of this district Dhaniakhali, Arambagh, Goghat, Pursurah, Haripal, Polba-Dadpur, Tarakeswar, Pandua and Singur contributed much of its production of this district.

Some of the primary and other hats or markets in the Pandua block area are at: Boinchi, Khanyan, Pandua and Simlagarh.

The Tebhaga movement launched in 1946, in 24 Parganas district, aimed at securing for the share-croppers a better position within the existing land relation structure. Although the subsequent Bargadari Act of 1950 recognised the rights of bargadars to a higher share of crops from the land that they tilled, it was not implemented fully. Large tracts, beyond the prescribed limit of land ceiling, remained with the rich landlords. From 1977 onwards major land reforms took place in West Bengal. Land in excess of land ceiling was acquired and distributed amongst the peasants.

Important Handicrafts of Hooghly District
- Zari Work on Sari - Pandua, Pursurah, Jangipara, Tarakeswar and other blocks - 3,000 families involved
- Chikon Embroidery – Babnan, Pandua, Singur - 2,500 families involved
- Silk and Cotton Printing – Serampore (Chanditala) - 300 families involved
- Brass and Bell Metal – Manikpat, Goghat, Arambagh - 150 families involved
- Conch Shell – Pandua, Khanakul, Makla, Chandannagar
- Jute Diversified Product – Baidyabati, Mogra
- Terracota – Chinsurah, Chandannagar, Baidyabati, Mogra

Source:District Human Development Report 2010: Hooghly P. 67

Following land reforms land ownership pattern has undergone transformation. In 2013-14, persons engaged in agriculture in Pandua CD Block could be classified as follows: bargadars 7.73%, patta (document) holders 7.29%, small farmers (possessing land between 1 and 2 hectares) 3.07%, marginal farmers (possessing land up to 1 hectare) 19.40% and agricultural labourers 62.51%.

Pandua CD Block had 127 fertiliser depots, 54 seed stores and 61 fair price shops in 2013-14.

In 2013-14, Pandua CD Block produced 4,608 tonnes of Aman paddy, the main winter crop from 1,846 hectares, 34,119 tonnes of Boro paddy (spring crop) from 11,592 hectares, 1,980 tonnes of Aus paddy (summer crop) from 800 hectares and 288,975 tonnes of potatoes from 10,461 hectares. It also produced oilseeds.

In 2013-14, the total area irrigated in Pandua CD Block was 29,092 hectares, out of which 15,175 hectares were irrigated by canal water, 1,850 hectares by tank water, 860 hectares by river lift irrigation, 4,040 hectares by deep tube wells and 7,167 hectares by shallow tube wells.

=== Banking ===
In 2013-14, Pandua CD Block had offices of 14 commercial banks and 3 gramin banks.

== Transport ==
Pandua CD Block has 1 ferry service and 12 originating/ terminating bus routes.

Howrah-Bardhaman main line was made operable from Howrah to Raniganj in 1855. There are stations at Khanyan, Pundooah, Simlagarh, Bainchigram and Bainchi. It is part of the Kolkata Suburban Railway network.

SH 13/ GT Road passes through this block.

== Education ==
In 2013-14, Pandua CD Block had 185 primary schools with 18,168 students, 8 middle schools with 848 students, 25 high schools with 15,116 students and 13 higher secondary schools with 18,312 students. Pandua CD Block had 1 general college with 4,368 students, 4 technical/ professional institutions with 461 students and 613 institutions for special and non-formal education with 12,382 students

Bejoy Narayan Mahavidyalaya, a general degree college, was established at Itachuna in 1950.

In Pandua CD Block, amongst the 153 inhabited villages, 12 had no school, 59 had more than 1 primary school, 103 had at least 1 primary school, 38 had at least 1 primary and 1 middle school and 30 had at least 1 middle and 1 secondary school.

== Healthcare ==
In 2014, Pandua CD Block had 1 rural hospital, 6 primary health centres and 4 private nursing homes with total 45 beds and 9 doctors (excluding private bodies). It had 51 family welfare subcentres. 11,327 patients were treated indoor and 410,244 patients were treated outdoor in the hospitals, health centres and subcentres of the CD Block.

Pandua CD Block has Pandua Rural Hospital (with 30 beds) at Pandua, B.L.Mukherjee Primary Health Centre (Boinchigram) at Boinchi (with 10 beds), Itachuna PHC at Itachuna (with 10 beds), Dwarbasini PHC (with 4 beds), Ramswarpur-Gopalnagar PHC at PO Chandpur (with 10 beds), Haraldaspur PHC at PO Hatni (with 10 beds) and Jamgram PHC (with 6 beds).

Pandua CD Block is one of the areas of Hooghly district where ground water is affected by moderate level of arsenic contamination. The WHO guideline for arsenic in drinking water is 10 mg/ litre, and the Indian Standard value is 50 mg/ litre. In Hooghly district, 16 blocks have arsenic levels above WHO guidelines and 11 blocks above Indian standard value. The maximum concentration in Pandua CD Block is 61 mg/litre.
