= Bengai =

- Village
- Location in West Bengal, India
- Coordinates: 22.94595°N 87.6885°E
- Country: India
- State: West Bengal
- District: Hooghly

Population (2011)
  - Total: 4,674

Languages
  - Official: Bengali, English
- Time zone: UTC+5:30 (IST)
- PIN: 712611
- Sex ratio: 922 ♂/♀
- Lok Sabha constituency: Arambag

Bengai is a village in the Goghat II CD block in the Arambagh subdivision of the Hooghly district in the Indian state of West Bengal.

== Geography ==
Cities and towns in Arambagh subdivision in Hooghly district
M: municipal city/ town, R: rural/ urban centre, H: historical/ religious centre
Owing to space constraints in the small map, the actual locations in a larger map may vary slightly

=== Location ===
Bengai is located at 22.94595°N 87.6885°E.

=== Area overview ===
The Arambagh subdivision, presented in the map alongside, is divided into two physiographic parts – the Dwarakeswar River being the dividing line. The western part is upland and rocky – it is extension of the terrain of neighbouring Bankura district. The eastern part is flat alluvial plain area. The railways, the roads and flood-control measures have had an impact on the area. The area is overwhelmingly rural with 94.77% of the population living in rural areas and 5.23% living in urban areas.

Note: The map alongside presents some of the notable locations in the subdivision. All places marked in the map are linked in the larger full screen map.

== Demographics ==
According to the 2011 Census of India, Bengai had a total population of 4,674 of which 2,374 (51%) were males and 2,300 (49%) were females. Population in the age range 0–6 years was 468. The total number of literate persons in Bengai was 3,312 (78.74% of the population over 6 years).

== Education ==
- Aghorekamini Prakashchandra Mahavidyalaya, a general degree college, was established at Bengai in 1959.
- Bengai Girls' High School
- Subhasnagar ITI
- Sarat Vidyapith
- Rabindra Shiksha Niketan
- Swami Vivekananda Institute of Education
- Vivekananda Institute of Education
