= Shyambazar, Hooghly =

Shyambazar
- Village
- Location in West Bengal, India Shyambazar (India)
- Coordinates: 22.891122°N 87.566972°E
- Country: India
- State: West Bengal
- District: Hooghly

Population (2011)
  - Total: 2,109

Languages
  - Official: Bengali, English
- Time zone: UTC+5:30 (IST)
- PIN: 712612
- Telephone/STD code: 03211
- Lok Sabha constituency: Arambagh
- Vidhan Sabha constituency: Goghat
- Website: hooghly.gov.in

Shyambazar is a village in the Goghat II CD block in the Arambagh subdivision of Hooghly district in the Indian state of West Bengal.

== Geography ==
Cities and towns in Arambagh subdivision in Hooghly district
M: municipal city/ town, R: rural/ urban centre, H: historical/ religious centre
Owing to space constraints in the small map, the actual locations in a larger map may vary slightly

=== Location ===
Shyambazar is located at 22.891122°N 87.566972°E

=== Area overview ===
The Dwarakeswar River divides the Arambagh subdivision, presented in the map alongside, into two physiographic parts. The western part is upland and rocky – it is extension of the terrain of neighbouring Bankura district. The eastern part is flat alluvial plain area. The railways, the roads and flood-control measures have had an impact on the area. The area is overwhelmingly rural with 94.77% of the population living in rural areas and 5.23% of the population living in urban areas.

Note: The map alongside presents some of the notable locations in the subdivision. All places marked in the map are linked in the larger full screen map.

== Demographics ==
As per the 2011 Census of India, Shyambazar had a total population of 6,293 of which 3,214 (51%) were males and 3,079 (49%) were females. Population in the age range 0–6 years was 776. The total number of literate persons in Shyambazar was 4,039 (73.21% of the population over 6 years).

== Shyambazar picture gallery ==
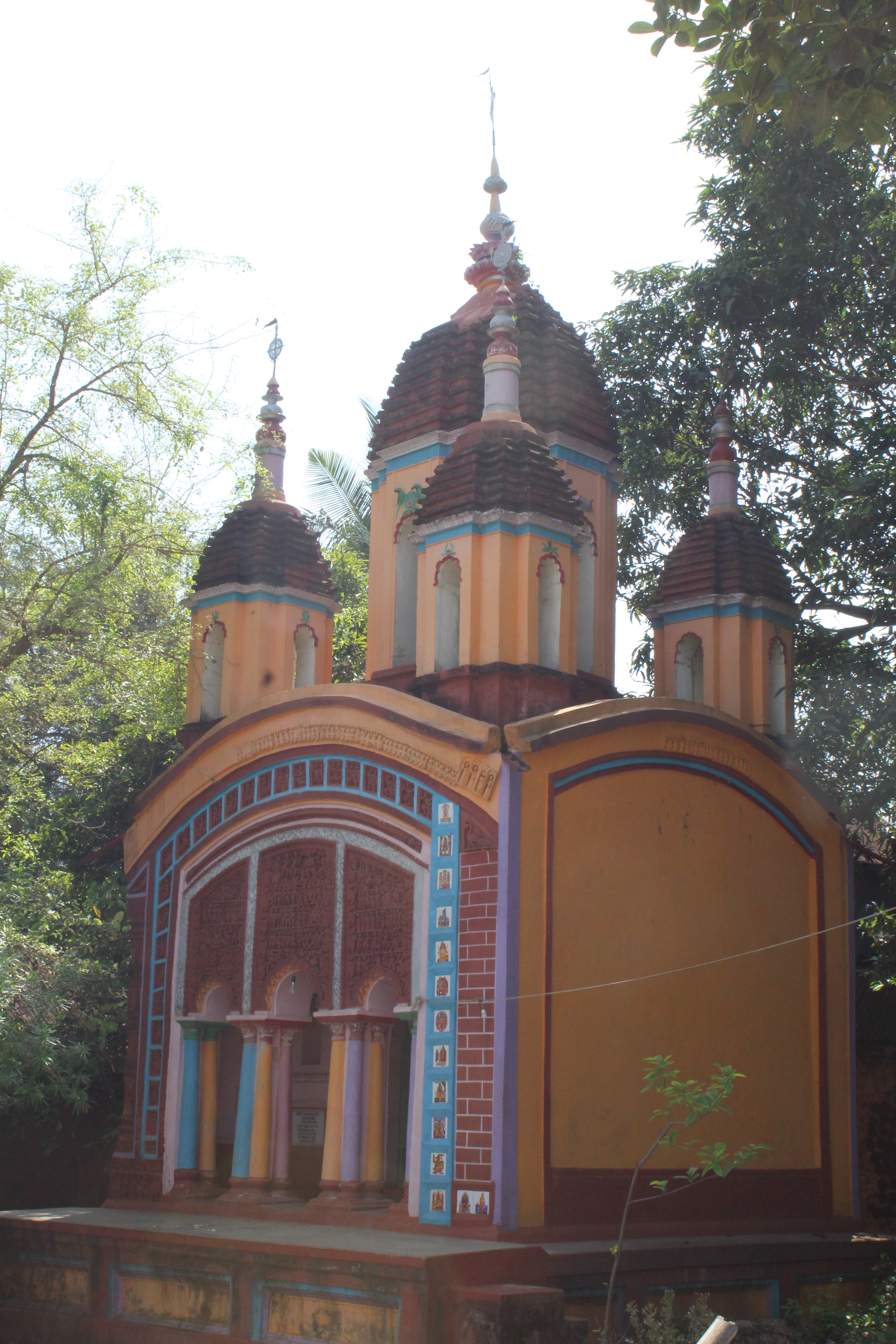
Pancha ratna Radha Damodar temple of Das family

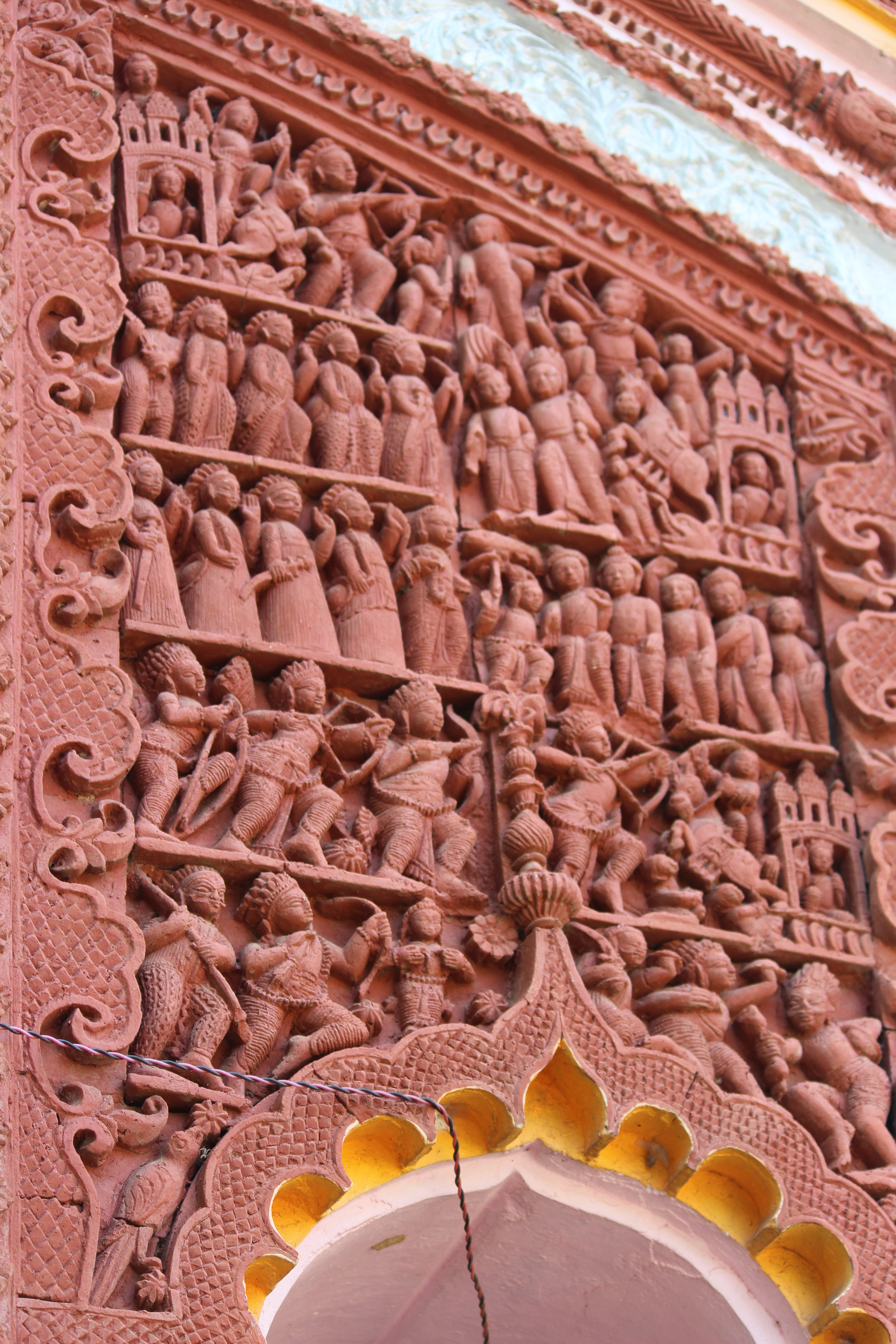
Terracotta relief in Radha Damodara temple

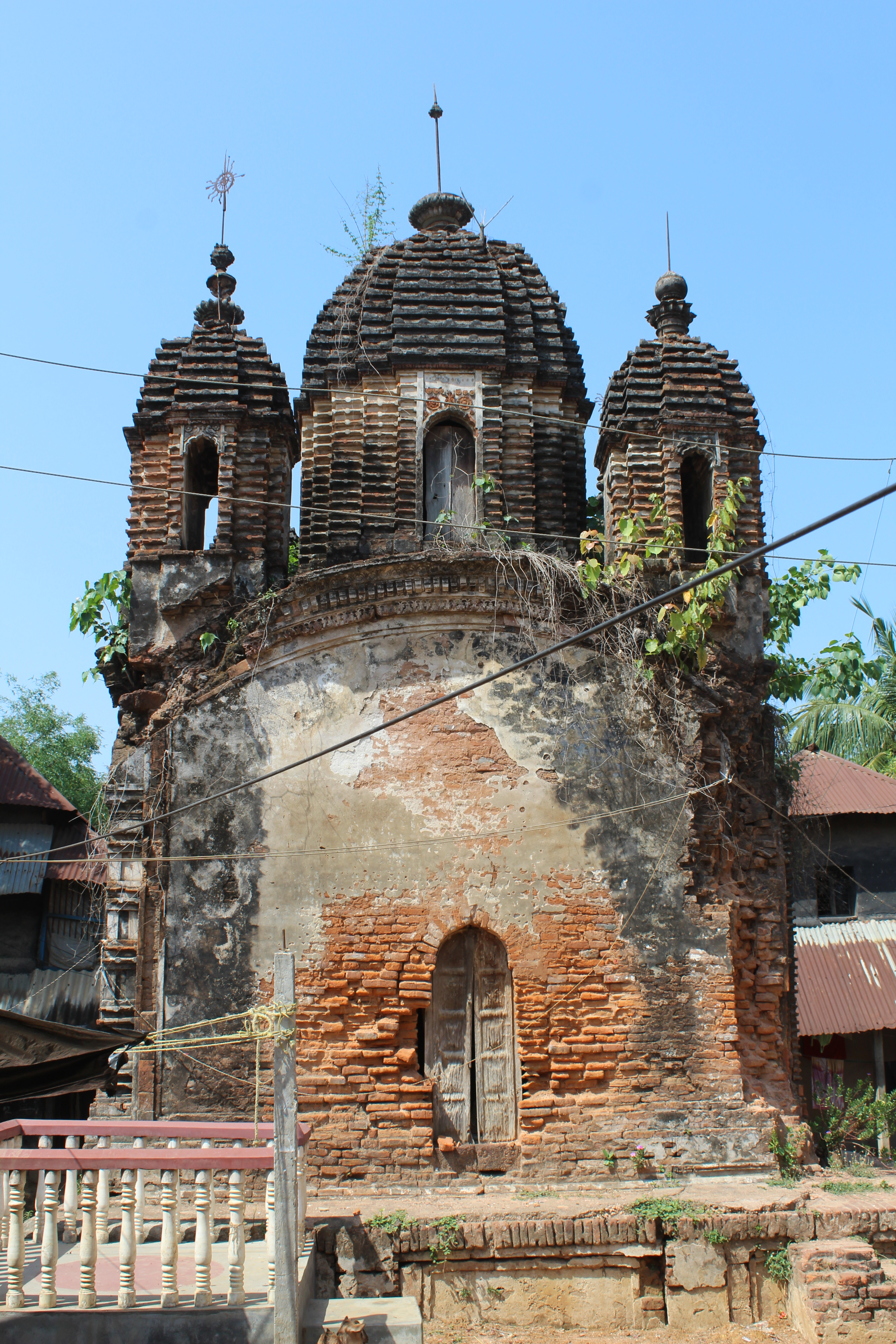
Pancha ratna temple of Dutta family built in 1790

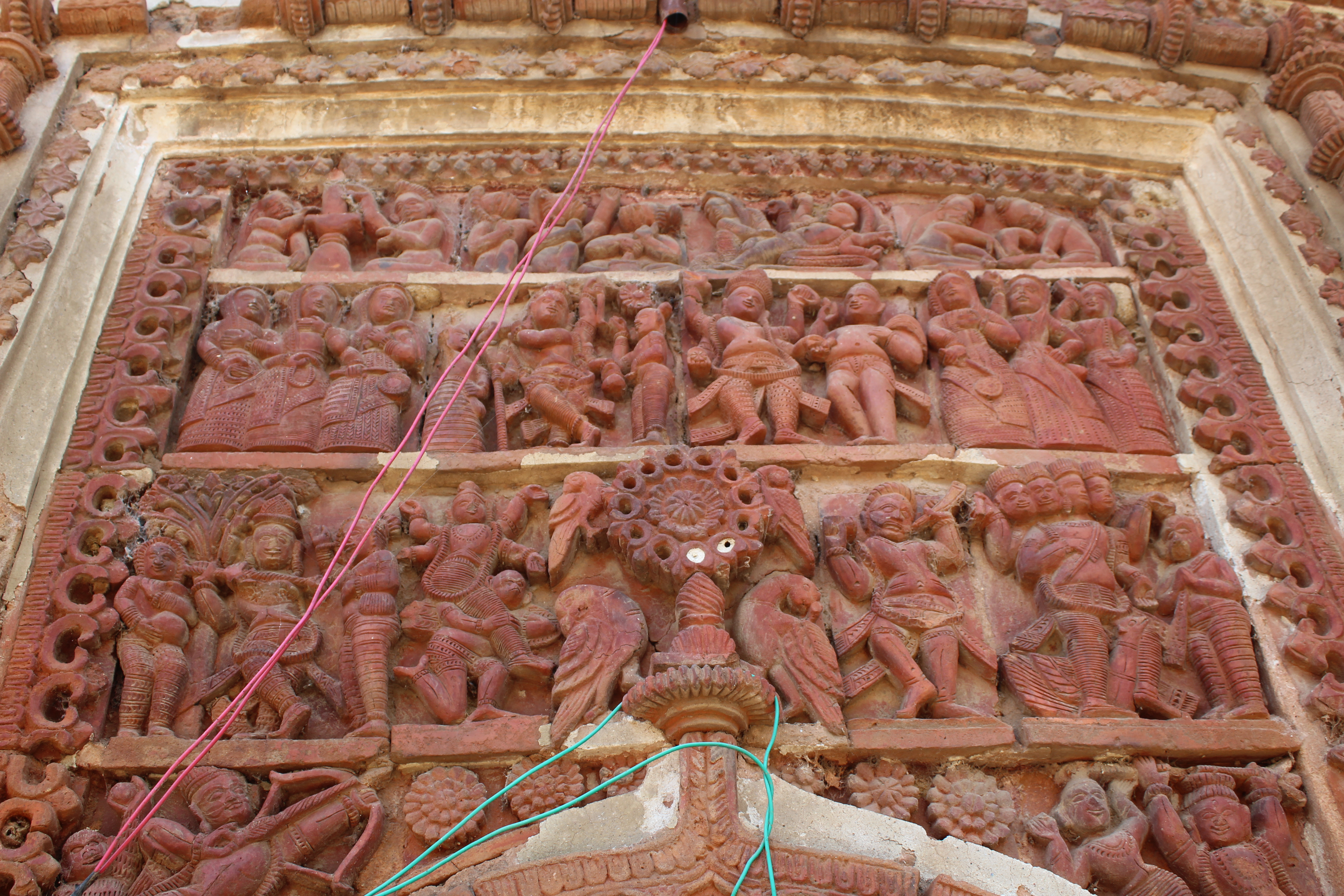
Terracota relief in Dutta family temple

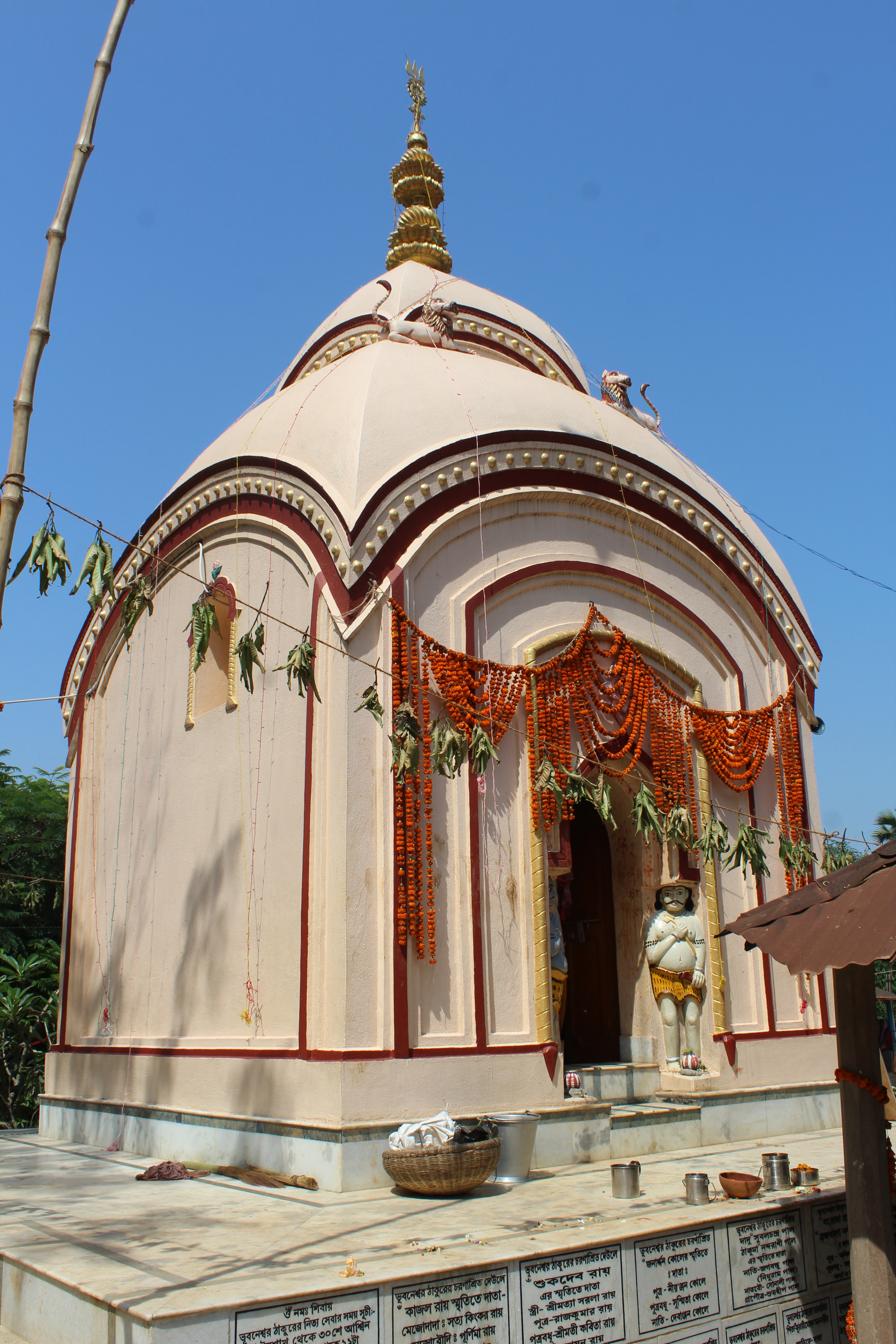
Bhuvneswar Shiva temple

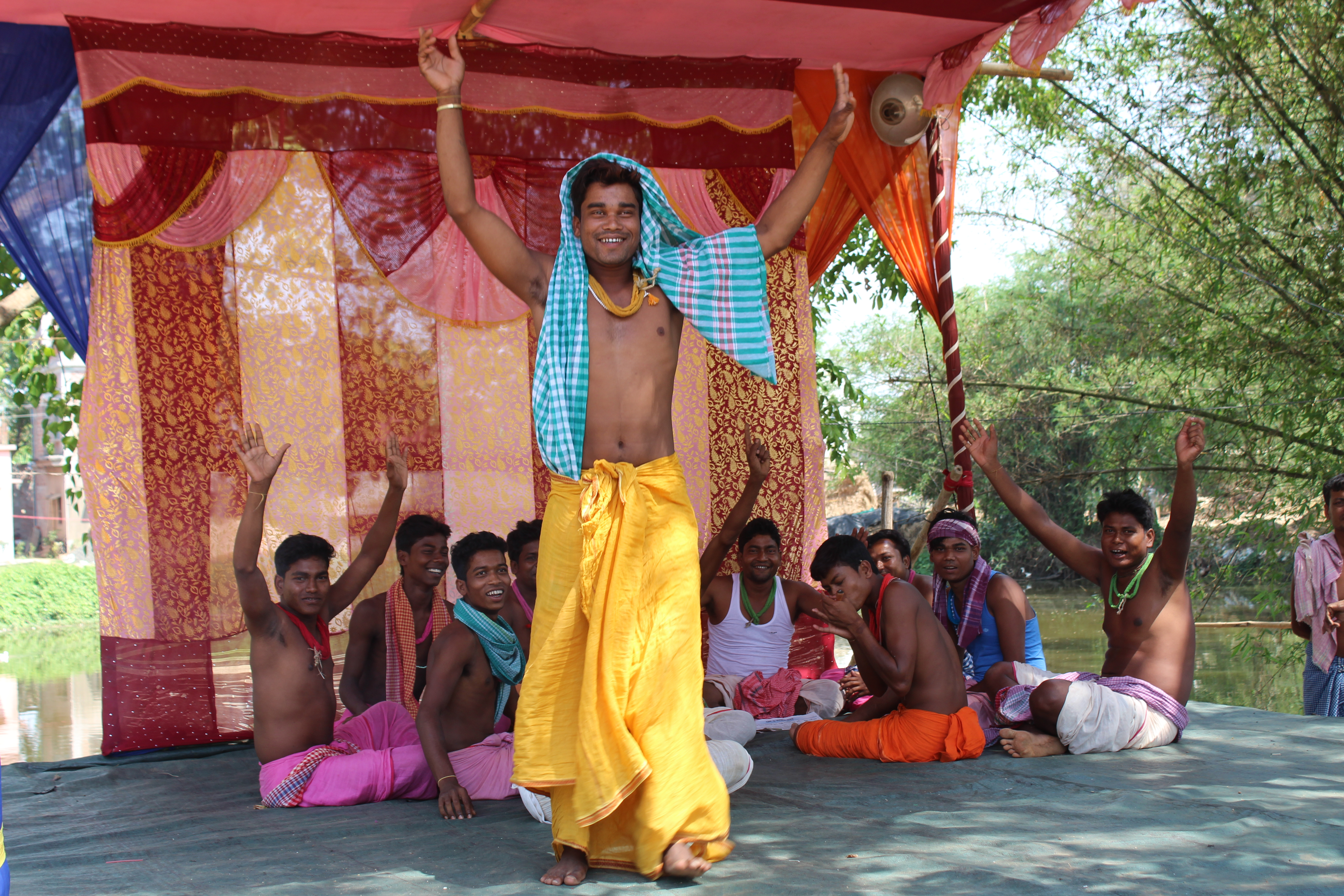
Gajan utsab at Shiva temple
