= Mamudpur, Arambagh =

Mamudpur
- Village
- Location in West Bengal, India Mamudpur (India)
- Coordinates: 22.890523°N 87.597872°E
- Country: India
- State: West Bengal
- District: Hooghly

Population (2011)
  - Total: 2,109

Languages
  - Official: Bengali, English
- Time zone: UTC+5:30 (IST)
- PIN: 712612
- Telephone/STD code: 03211
- Lok Sabha constituency: Arambagh
- Vidhan Sabha constituency: Goghat
- Website: hooghly.gov.in

Mamudpur is a village in the Goghat II CD block in the Arambagh subdivision of Hooghly district in the Indian state of West Bengal.

== Geography ==
Cities and towns in Arambagh subdivision in Hooghly district
M: municipal city/ town, R: rural/ urban centre, H: historical/ religious centre
Owing to space constraints in the small map, the actual locations in a larger map may vary slightly

=== Area overview ===
The Arambagh subdivision, presented in the map alongside, is divided into two physiographic parts – the Dwarakeswar River being the dividing line. The western part is upland and rocky – it is the extension of the terrain of neighbouring Bankura district. The eastern part is flat alluvial plain area. The railways, the roads and flood-control measures have had an impact on the area. The area is overwhelmingly rural with 94.77% of the population living in rural areas and only 5.23% residing in urban areas.

Note: The map alongside presents some of the notable locations in the subdivision. All places marked in the map are linked in the larger full screen map.

=== Location ===
Mamudpur is located at 22.890523°N 87.597672°E

== Demographics ==
As per the 2011 Census of India, Mamudpur had a total population of 2,109 of which 1,074 (51%) were males and 1,035 (49%) were females. Population in the age range 0–6 years was 238. The total number of literate persons in Mamudpur was 1,280 (68.41% of the population over 6 years).

== Culture ==
David J. McCutchion mentions a pancha ratna with rich terracotta façade in Mamudpur.

== Mamudpur picture gallery ==
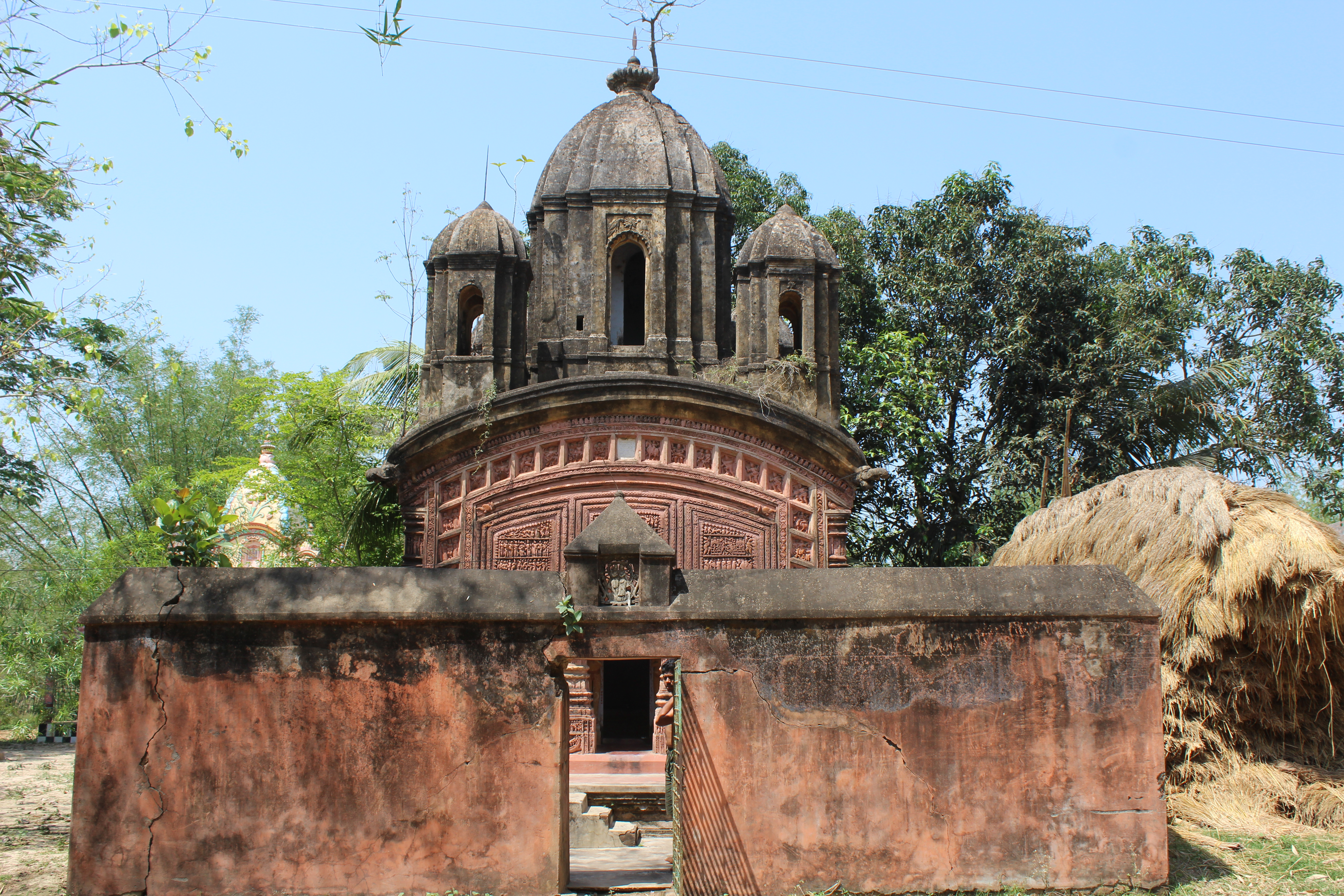
Vishnu temple of Rai family, a pancha ratna, built in 1806

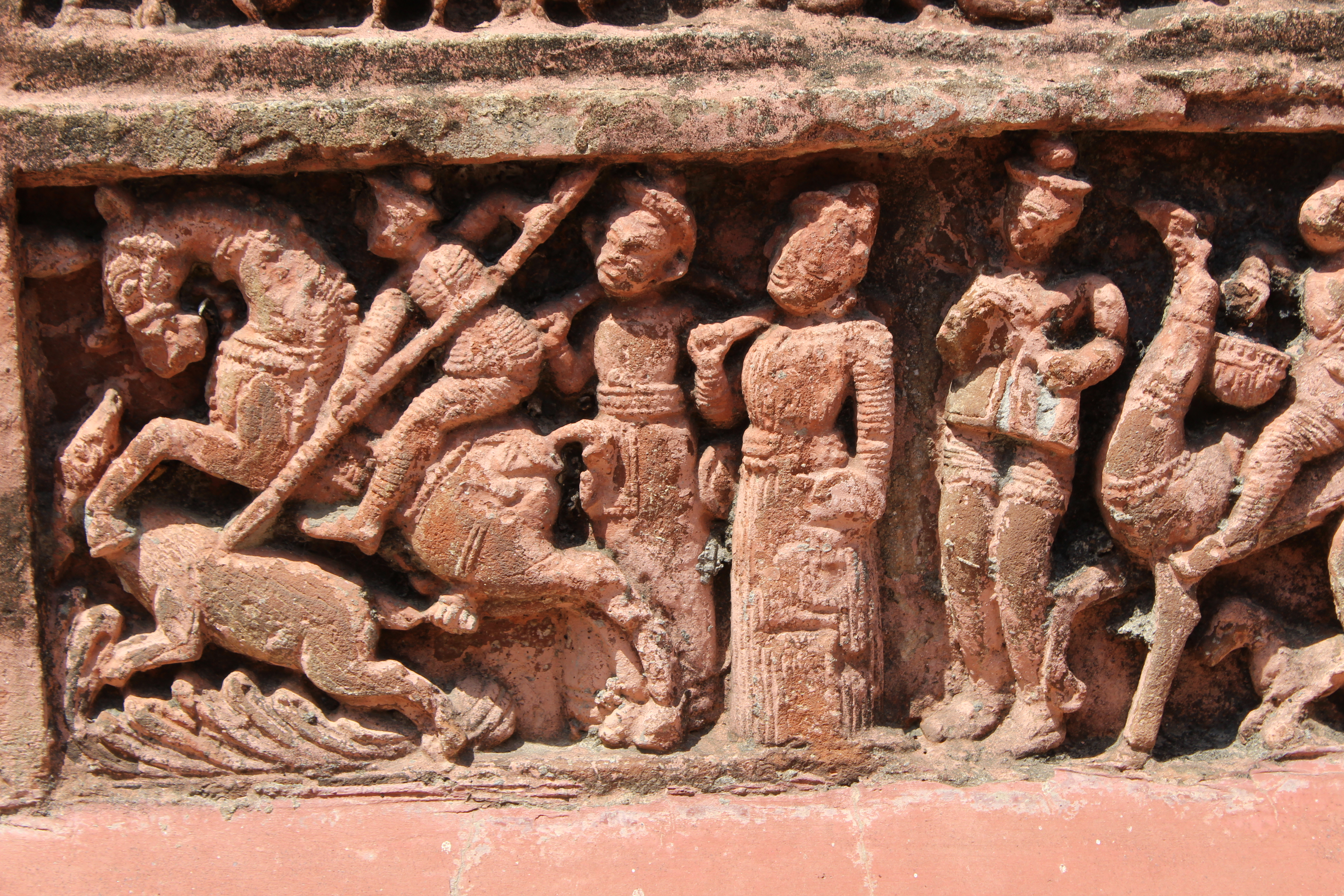
Terracotta panel in Vishnu temple.

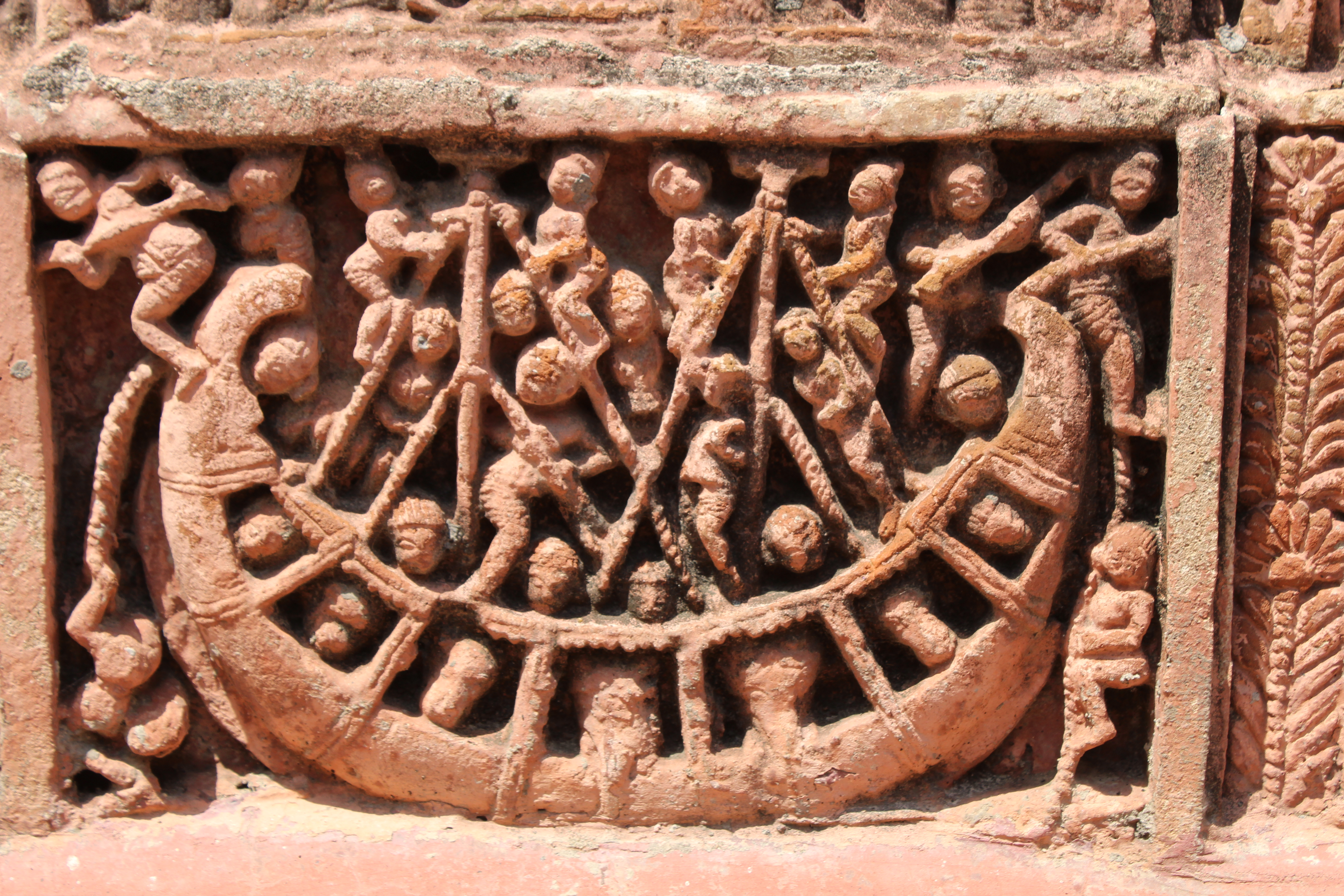
Terracotta panel in Vishnu temple.

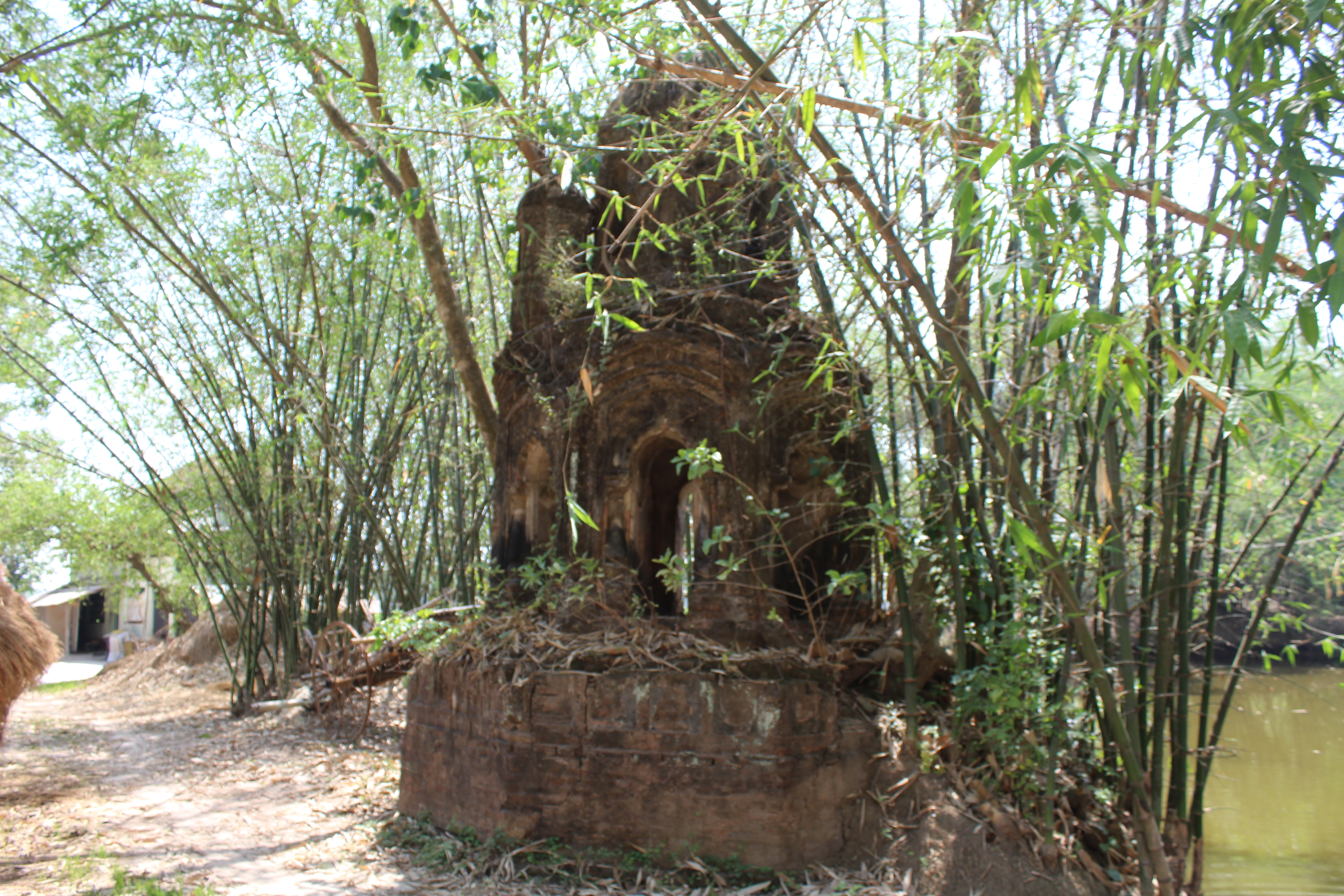
A small temple.

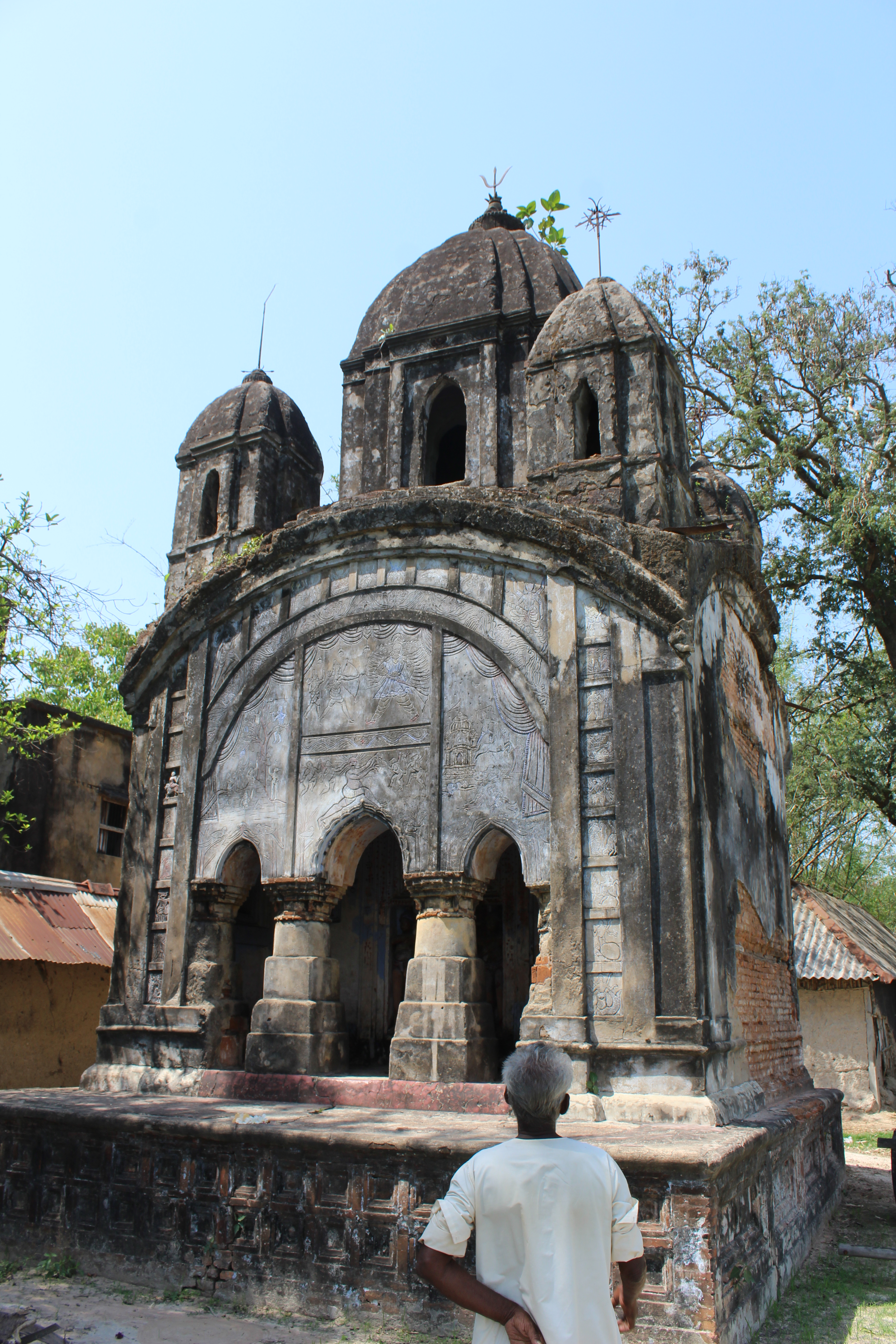
Another pancha ratna temple.
