= Memanpur =

- Village
- Location in West Bengal, India Memanpur (India)
- Coordinates: 22.892523°N 87.617472°E
- Country: India
- State: West Bengal
- District: Hooghly

Languages
  - Official: Bengali, English
- Time zone: UTC+5:30 (IST)
- PIN: 712612
- Telephone/STD code: 03211
- Lok Sabha constituency: Arambagh
- Vidhan Sabha constituency: Goghat
- Website: hooghly.gov.in

Memanpur is a village in the Goghat II CD block in the Arambagh subdivision of Hooghly district in the Indian state of West Bengal.

== Geography ==
Cities and towns in Arambagh subdivision in Hooghly district
M: municipal city/ town, R: rural/ urban centre, H: historical/ religious centre
Owing to space constraints in the small map, the actual locations in a larger map may vary slightly

=== Area overview ===
The Arambagh subdivision, presented in the map alongside, is divided into two physiographic parts – the Dwarakeswar River being the dividing line. The western part is upland and rocky – it is the extension of the terrain of neighbouring Bankura district. The eastern part is flat alluvial plain area. The railways, the roads and flood-control measures have had an impact on the area. The area is overwhelmingly rural with 94.77% of the population living in rural areas and only 5.23% living in urban areas.

Note: The map alongside presents some of the notable locations in the subdivision. All places marked in the map are linked in the larger full screen map.

=== Location ===
Memanpur is located at 22.892523°N 87.617472°E

Memanpur was not identified as a separate place in 2011 census and is not marked in Google maps. However, an old Shyamsundar pancharatna mandir is indicated at the coordinates marked above. Memanpur Primary School is located nearby.

== Culture ==
David J. McCutchion mentions a pancha ratna Syama Sundara temple, built possibly in the 17th century, at Memanpr.

== Memanpur picture gallery ==
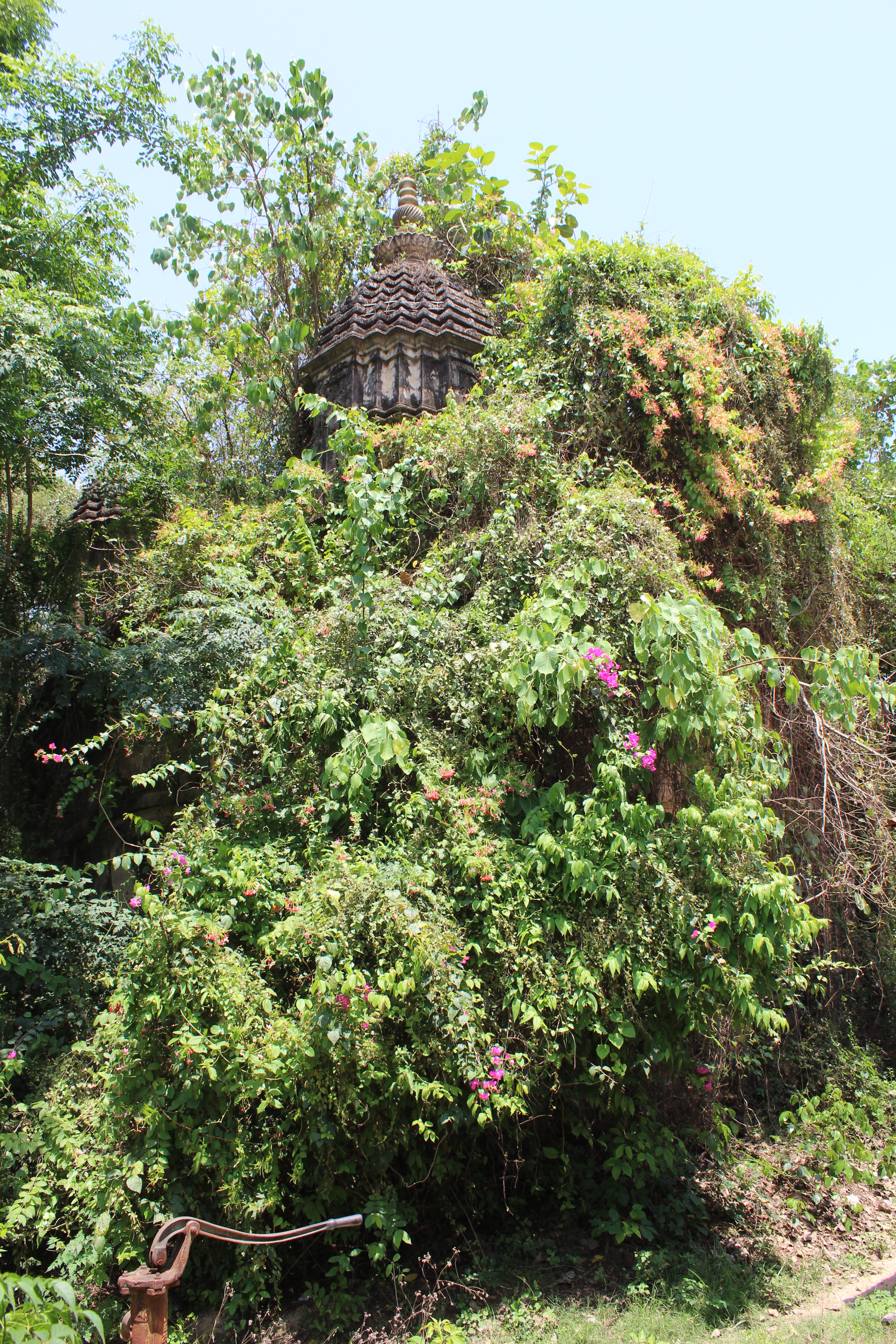
Pancha ratna Shyama Sundar temple (or Vishnu) temple, almost covered by vegetation in 2018 - top of central pinnacle is visible

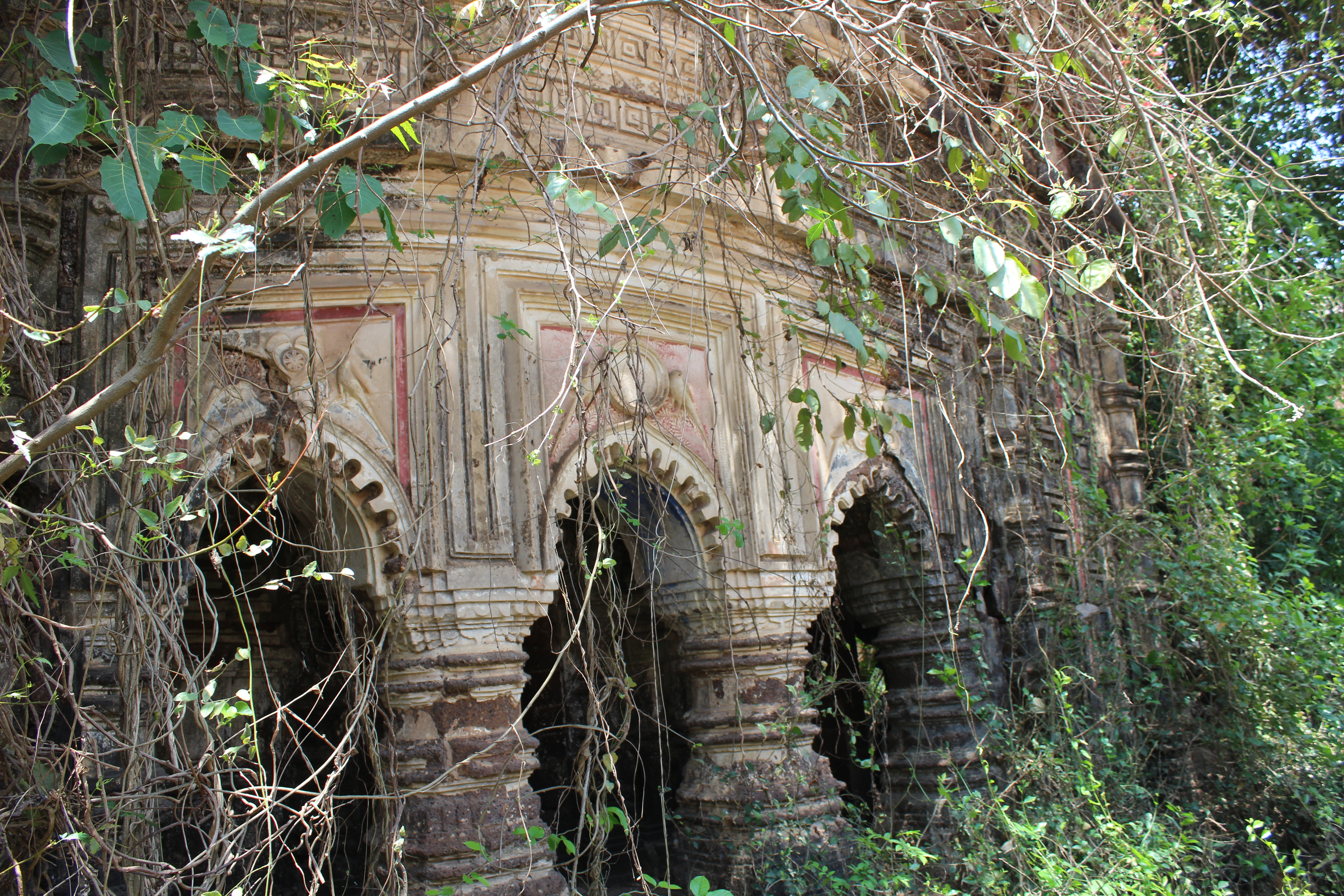
A closer view of the temple

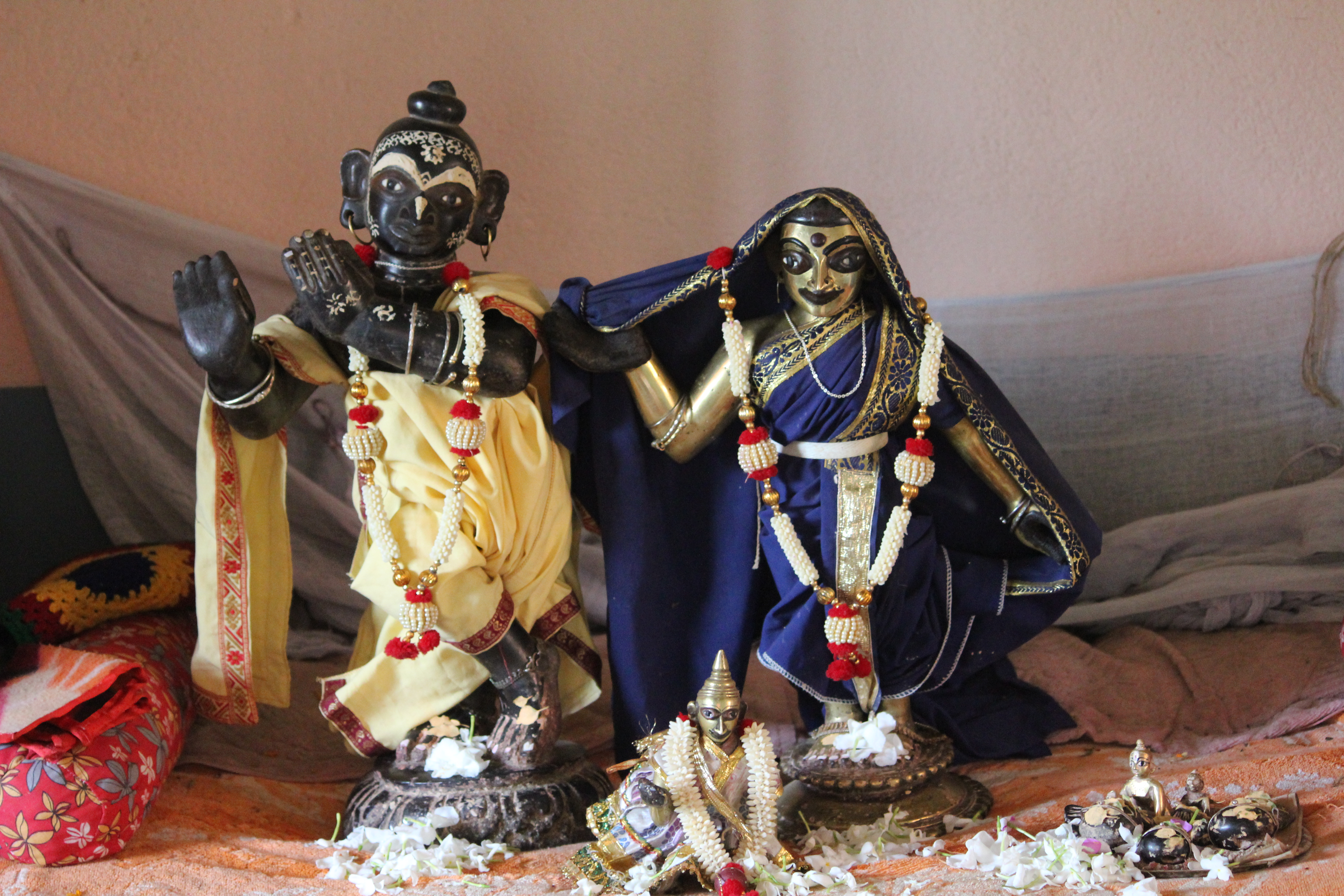
Deity inside the temple
