= Goghat II =

- Community development block
- Interactive map of Goghat II
- Coordinates: 22.9051990°N 87.6489720°E
- Country: India
- State: West Bengal
- District: Hooghly

Government
  - Type: Representative democracy

Area
  - Total: 190.03 km^{2} (73.37 sq mi)
- Elevation: 42 m (138 ft)

Population (2011)
  - Total: 160,585
  - Density: 845.05/km^{2} (2,188.7/sq mi)

Languages
  - Official: Bengali, English
- Time zone: UTC+5:30 (IST)
- PIN: 712611 (Bengai); 712612 (Kamarpukur)
- Area code: 03211
- ISO 3166 code: IN-WB
- Vehicle registration: WB-15, WB-16, WB-18
- Literacy: 77.24%
- Lok Sabha constituency: Arambagh
- Vidhan Sabha constituency: Goghat
- Website: hooghly.gov.in

Goghat II is a community development block that forms an administrative division in Arambag subdivision of Hooghly district in the Indian state of West Bengal.

== Overview ==
The Goghat II CD Block is part of the western uplands, which is an extension of the rocky and undulating physiography found in adjoining Bankura district.

== Geography ==
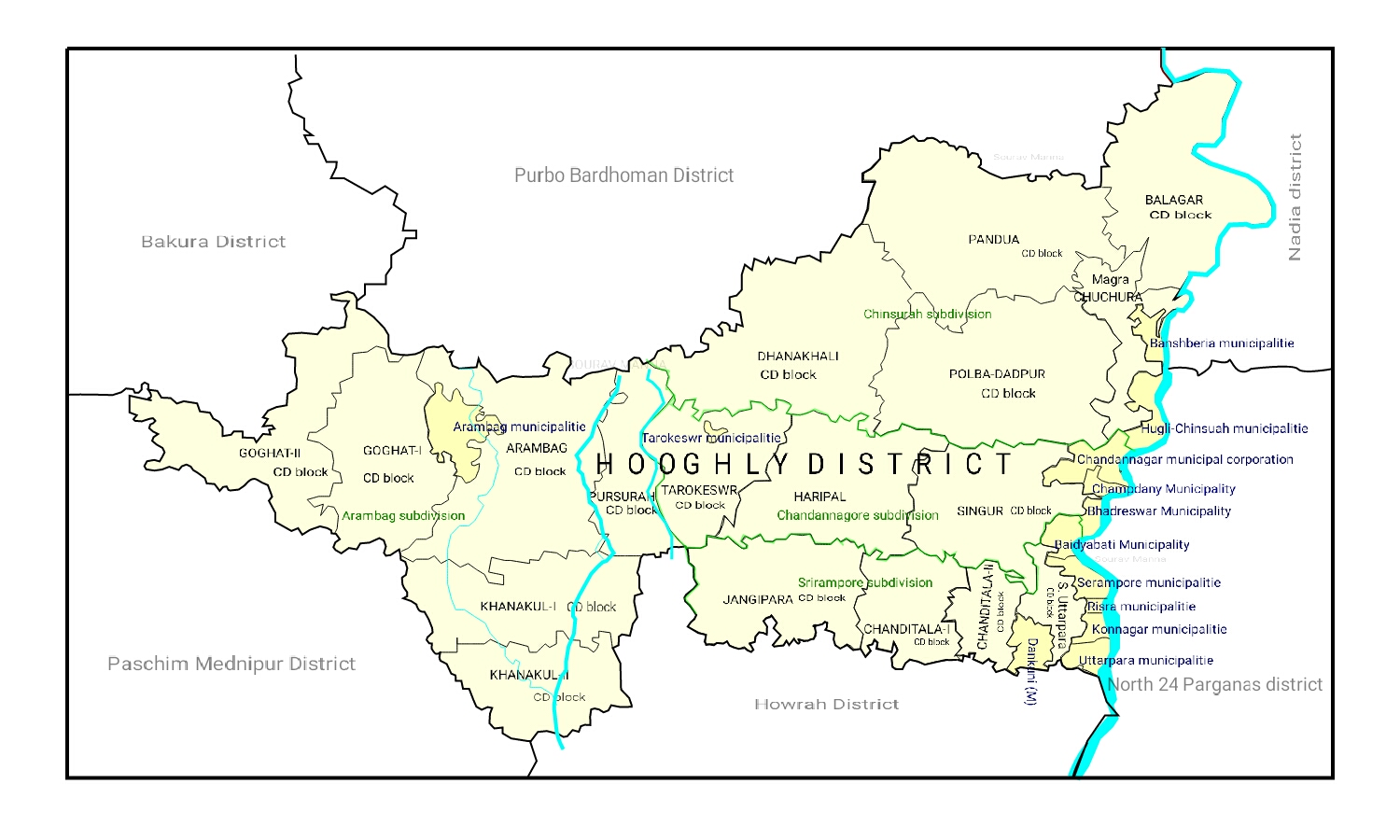
Map of Hooghly district showing CD blocks and municipal areas

Goghat-II CD block map sowing GP areas

Kamarpukur is located at 22°54′19″N 87°38′56″E.

Goghat II CD Block is bounded by Raina II CD Block, in Purba Bardhaman district, in the north, Goghat I in the east, Chandrakona I and Garhbeta II CD Blocks, in Paschim Medinipur district in the south and Kotulpur CD Block, in Bankura district, in the west.

It is located 100 km from Chinsurah, the district headquarters.

Goghat II CD Block has an area of 190.03 km^{2}. It has 1 panchayat samity, 19 gram panchayats, 121 gram sansads (village councils), 112 mouzas and 110 inhabited villages. Goghat police station serves this block. Headquarters of this CD Block is at Kamarpukur.

Kamarpukur, the place where the headquarters of this block is situated, is the birthplace of Sri Ramkrishna.

The ruins of an Afghan era fort at Gar Mandaran, made famous by Bankim Chandra Chattopadhyay in his novel Durgeshnandini, is located in this block.

Gram panchayats of Goghat II block/ panchayat samiti are: Bengai, Bhadanganj-Falui I, Bhadanganj-Falui II, Hazipur, Kamarpukur, Kumarganj, Mandarin, Paschimpara and Shyambazar.

== Demographics ==
=== Population ===
As per the 2011 Census of India, Goghat II CD Block had a total population of 160,585, all of which were rural. There were 82,262 (51%) males and 78,323 (49%) females. Population below 6 years was 17,056. Scheduled Castes numbered 58,052 (36.15%) and Scheduled Tribes numbered 7,587 (4.72%).

As per 2001 census, Goghat II block had a total population of 143,353, out of which 73,489 were males and 69,864 were females. Goghat II block registered a population growth of 15.95 per cent during the 1991-2001 decade. Decadal growth for Hooghly district was 15.72 per cent. Decadal growth in West Bengal was 17.84 per cent.

Large villages (with 4,000+ population) nin Goghat II CD Block are (2011 census figures in brackets): Bengai (4,674), Shripur (4,727), Gar Mandaran (6,264), Shyambazar (6,291), Fului (5,984) and Selampur (4,471).

Other villages in Goghat II CD Block include (2011 census figures in brackets): Kamarpukur (3,121), Badanganj (3,865), Hazipur (3,643), Kumarganj (1,171), Kayapat (3,351), Mamudpur (2,109) and Satberia (1,378).

=== Literacy ===
As per the 2011 census the total number of literates in Goghat II CD Block was 110,867 (77.24% of the population over 6 years) out of which males numbered 61,756 (84.15% of the male population over 6 years) and females numbered 49,111 (70.02% of the female population over 6 years). The gender disparity (the difference between female and male literacy rates) was 14.13%.

As per the 2001 census, Goghat II block had a total literacy of 51.92 per cent. While male literacy was 74.80 per cent, female literacy was 41.22 per cent.

See also – List of West Bengal districts ranked by literacy rate

Literacy in CD blocks of
Hooghly district
Arambagh subdivision
Arambagh – 79.10
Khanakul I – 77.73
Khanakul II – 79.16
Goghat I – 78.70
Goghat II – 77.24
Pursurah – 82.12
Chandannagar subdivision
Haripal – 78.59
Singur – 84.01
Tarakeswar – 79.96
Chinsurah subdivision
Balagarh – 76.94
Chinsurah Mogra – 83.01
Dhaniakhali – 75.66
Pandua – 75.86
Polba Dadpur – 75.14
Srirampore subdivision
Chanditala I – 83.76
Chanditala II – 84.78
Jangipara – 75.34
Sreerampur Uttarpara – 87.33
Source: 2011 Census: CD Block Wise
Primary Census Abstract Data

=== Language and religion ===
Religion in Goghat II CD block (2011)
Hinduism	83.48%
Islam	15.48%
Other (tribal religion)	0.91%
Other or not stated	0.13%

As per the 2011 census, majority of the population of the district belong to the Hindu community with a population share of 82.9% followed by Muslims at 15.8%. The percentage of the Hindu population of the district has followed a decreasing trend from 87.1% in 1961 to 82.9% in the latest census 2011. On the other hand, the percentage of Muslim population has increased from 12.7% in 1961 to 15.8% in 2011 census.

In 2011 census Hindus numbered 134,063 and formed 83.48% of the population in Goghat II CD Block. Muslims numbered 24,860 and formed 15.48% of the population. Others numbered 1,662 and formed 1.04% of the population.

Languages of Goghat II CD block (2011)
1. Bengali (97.0%)
2. Santali (2.83%)
3. Others (0.20%)

At the time of the 2011 census, 96.97% of the population spoke Bengali and 2.83% Santali as their first language.

== Rural poverty ==
As per poverty estimates obtained from household survey for families living below poverty line in 2005, rural poverty in Goghat II CD Block was 17.85%.

== Economy ==
=== Livelihood ===
Livelihood
in Goghat II CD Block
1. Cultivators (29.0%)
2. Agricultural labourers (41.5%)
3. Household industries (4.11%)
4. Other Workers (25.4%)

In Goghat II CD Block in 2011, amongst the class of total workers, cultivators formed 29.00%, agricultural labourers 41.51%, household industry workers 4.11% and other workers 25.38%.

=== Infrastructure ===
There are 110 inhabited villages in Goghat II CD Block. 100% villages have power supply. 92 villages have more than one source of drinking water (tap, well, tube well, hand pump), 3 villages have only tube well/ borewell and 15 villages have only hand pump. 7 Villages have post offices, 17 villages have sub post offices and 1 villages has a post and telegraph office. 87 villages have landlines, 39 villages have public call offices and 99 villages have mobile phone coverage. 56 villages have pucca roads and 49 villages have bus service (public/ private). 19 villages have agricultural credit societies, 12 villages have commercial/ co-operative banks and 2 villages have bank ATMs.

Important Handicrafts of Hooghly District
- Zari Work on Sari - Pandua, Pursurah, Jangipara, Tarakeswar and other blocks - 3,000 families involved
- Chikon Embroidery – Babnan, Pandua, Singur - 2,500 families involved
- Silk and Cotton Printing – Serampore (Chanditala) - 300 families involved
- Brass and Bell Metal – Manikpat, Goghat, Arambagh - 150 families involved
- Conch Shell – Pandua, Khanakul, Makla, Chandannagar
- Jute Diversified Product – Baidyabati, Mogra
- Terracota – Chinsurah, Chandannagar, Baidyabati, Mogra

Source:District Human Development Report 2010: Hooghly P. 67

=== Agriculture ===
This is a rich agricultural area with several cold storages. Though rice is the prime crop of the district, the agricultural economy largely depends on potato, jute, vegetables, and orchard products. Though potato is cultivated in all the blocks of this district Dhaniakhali, Arambagh, Goghat, Pursurah, Haripal, Polba-Dadpur, Tarakeswar, Pandua and Singur contributed much of its production of this district.

Some of the primary and other hats or markets in the Goghat I and Goghat II CD Blocks are: Amar hat, Baddangang hat, Bengali market, Ballihat, Goghat market, Hazipur hat, Khatul hat, Kamarpukur, Madina market, Shyambazar hat, Shyamballabhpur market, Badanganj hat and Dewagang hat.

The Tebhaga movement launched in 1946, in 24 Parganas district, aimed at securing for the share-croppers a better position within the existing land relation structure. Although the subsequent Bargadari Act of 1950 recognised the rights of bargadars to a higher share of crops from the land that they tilled, it was not implemented fully. Large tracts, beyond the prescribed limit of land ceiling, remained with the rich landlords. From 1977 onwards major land reforms took place in West Bengal. Land in excess of land ceiling was acquired and distributed amongst the peasants. Following land reforms land ownership pattern has undergone transformation. In 2013-14, persons engaged in agriculture in Goghat II CD Block could be classified as follows: bargadars 10.38%, patta (document) holders 17.80%, small farmers (possessing land between 1 and 2 hectares) 3.70%, marginal farmers (possessing land up to 1 hectare) 28.23% and agricultural labourers 39.90%.

Goghat II CD Block had 85 fertiliser depots, 8 seed stores and 43 fair price shops in 2013-14.

In 2013-14, Goghat II CD Block produced 95,203 tonnes of Aman paddy, the main winter crop from 32,498 hectares, 13,351 tonnes of Boro paddy (spring crop) from 4,271 hectares, 1,346 tonnes of Aus paddy (summer crop) from 550 hectares and 40,723 tonnes of potatoes from 3,350 hectares. It also produced oilseeds and some wheat.

In 2013-14, the total area irrigated in Goghat I and Goghat II CD Blocks was 27,605 hectares, out of which 10,300 hectares were irrigated by canal water, 4,270 hectares by tank water, 870 hectares by river lift irrigation, 840 hectares by deep tube wells and 11,325 hectares by shallow tube wells.

=== Banking ===
In 2013-14, Goghat II CD Block had offices of 9 commercial banks and 1 gramin bank.

== Transport ==
Goghat II CD Block has 7 originating/ terminating bus routes. State Highway 7 (West Bengal) running from Rajgram (in Birbhum district) to Midnapore passes through this CD Block.

== Education ==
In 2013-14, Goghat II CD Block had 132 primary schools with 9,987 students, 6 middle schools with 337 students, 16 high schools with 8,321 students and 8 higher secondary schools with 8,230 students. Goghat II CD Block had 2 general colleges with 6,421 students, 1 technical/ professional institution with 37 students and 272 institutions for special and non-formal education with 9,265 students

Sri Ramkrishna Sarada Vidyamahapith, a general degree college, was established at Kamarpukur in 1959.

Aghorekamini Prakashchandra Mahavidyalaya, a general degree college, was established at Bengai in 1959.

In Goghat II CD Block, amongst the 110 inhabited villages, 10 villages had no school, 44 villages had more than 1 primary school, 63 villages had at least 1 primary school, 37 villages had at least 1 primary and 1 middle school and 25 villages had at least 1 middle and 1 secondary school.

== Culture ==
Sri Ramakrishna was born on 17 February 1836, in the village of Kamarpukur, in this CD block.

The Goghat II CD block has several heritage temples.

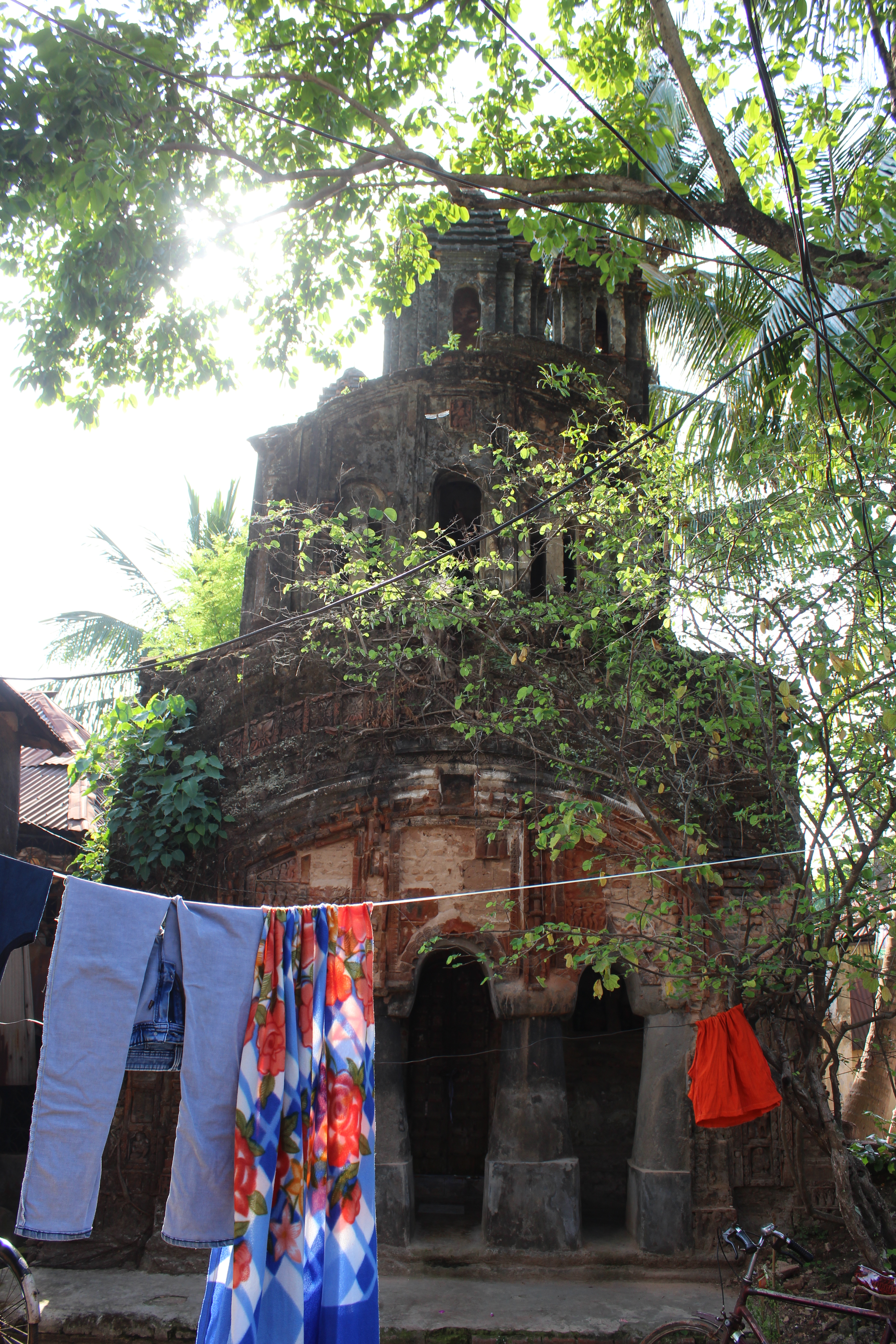
Kayapat: Sridhar Laljiu temple (in picture), built in 1807 and an adjacent at chala temple.

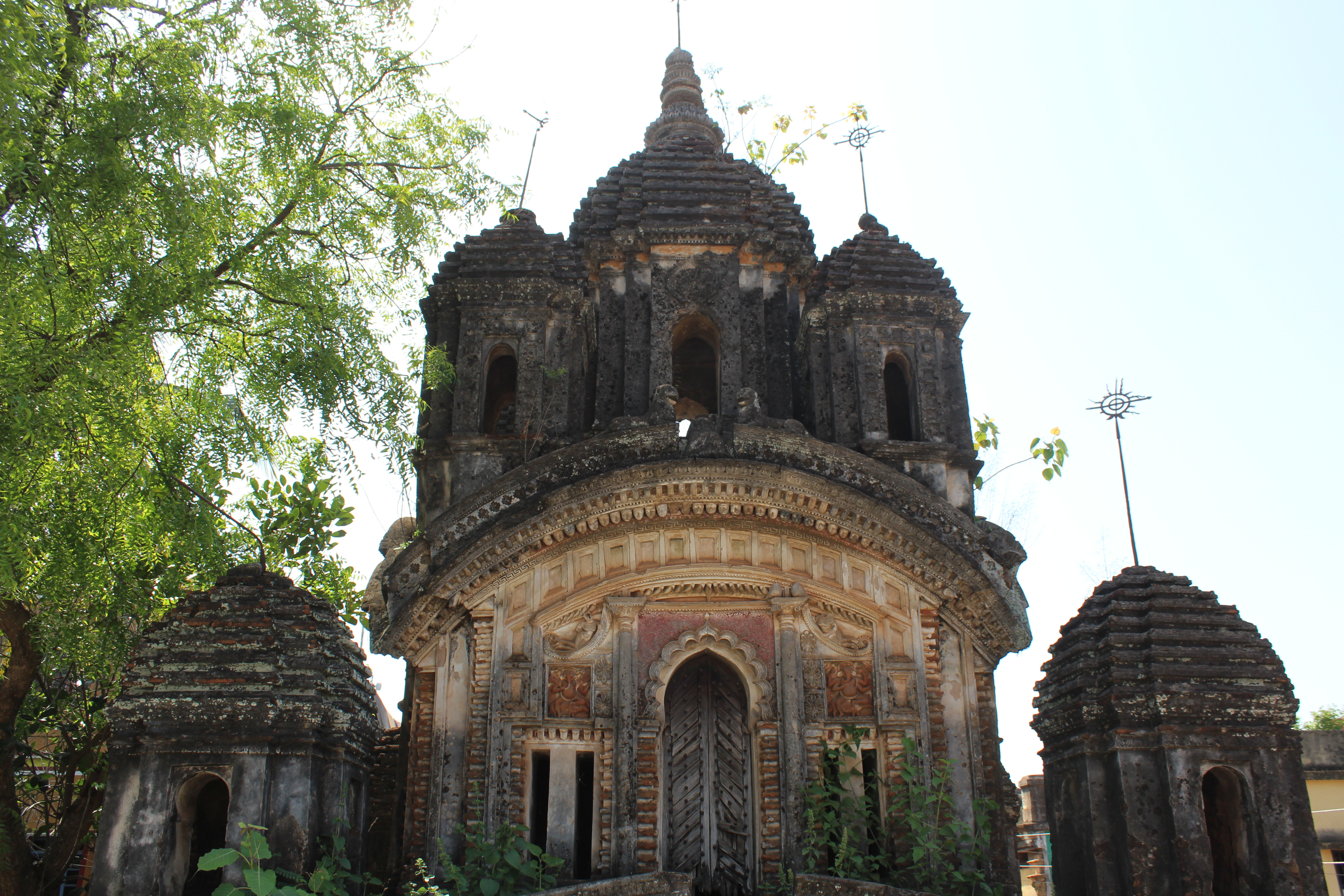
Badanganj: Damodara temple (in picture), built in 1810, with terracotta façade, and Sridhar Laljiu temple, built in 1802, with terracotta designs.

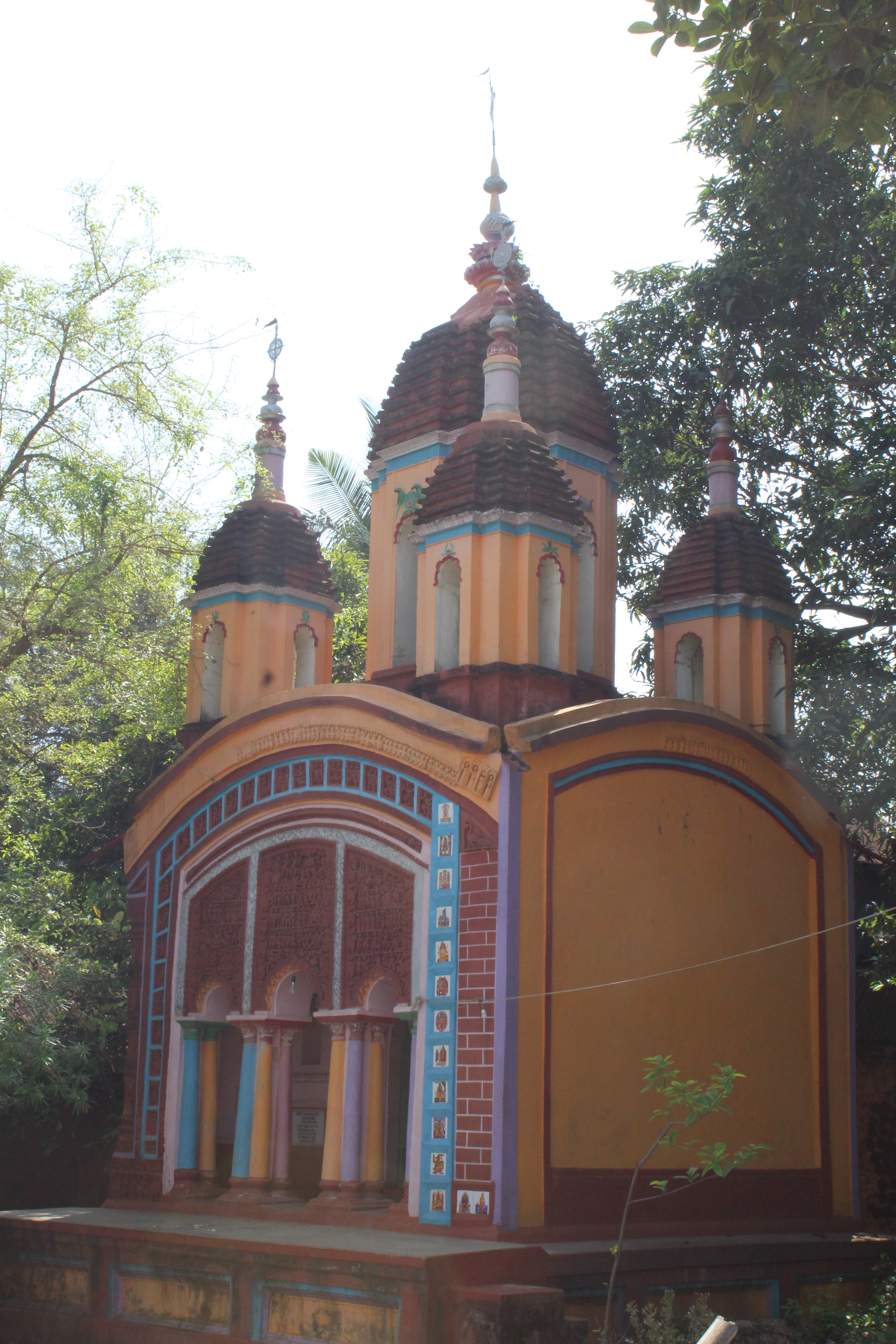
Shyambazar: Radha Damodar temple (in picture) with terracotta relief, pancha ratna temple of Das family, built in 1790, with terracotta work, and Bhuvaneswar Shiva temple.

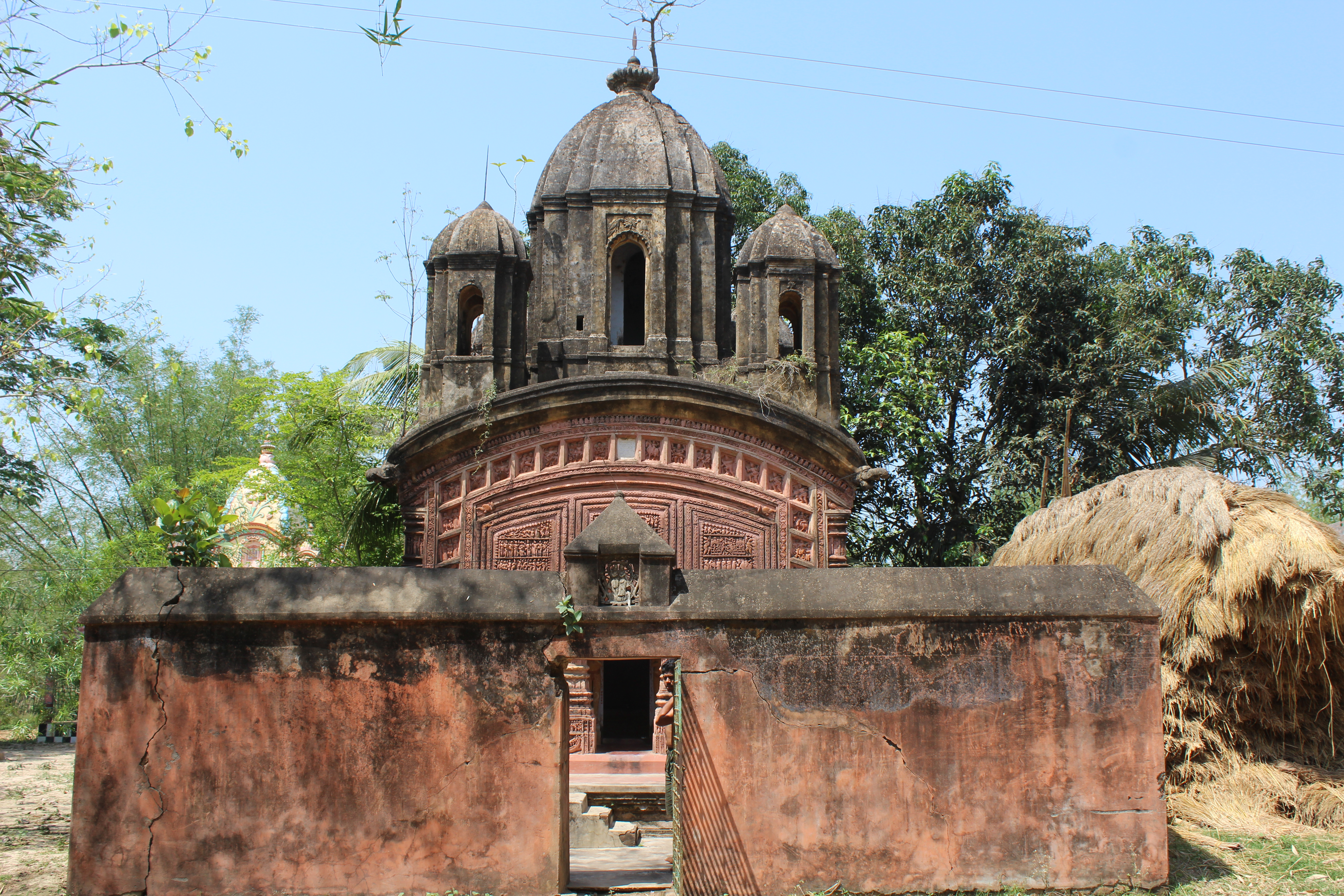
Mamudpur: Vishnu temple built in 1806 (in picture), with extensive terracotta relief, and other temples.

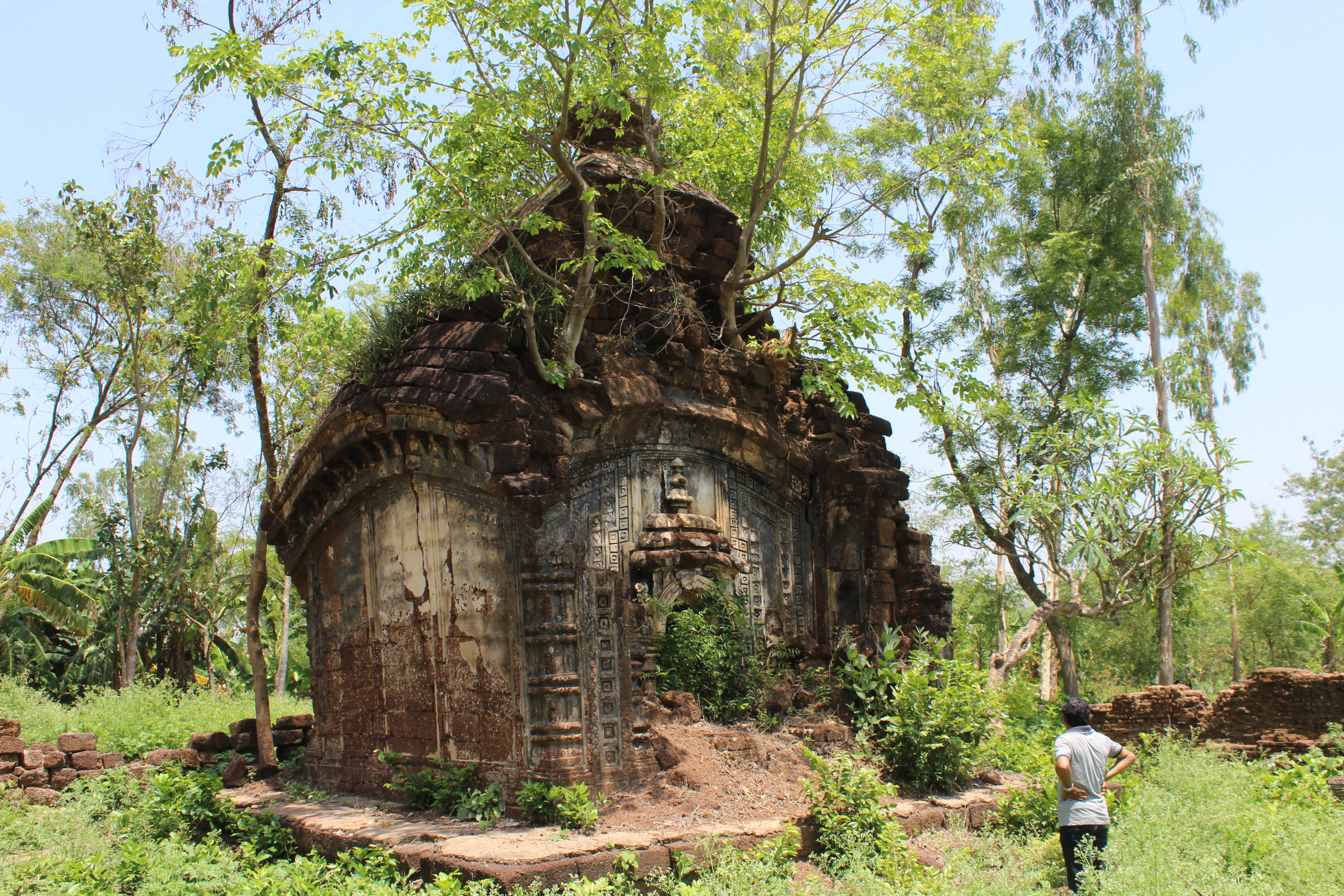
Satberia: Raghubir temple (in picture), where Khudiram Chattopadhyay, father of Sri Ramakrishna, performed priestly duties.

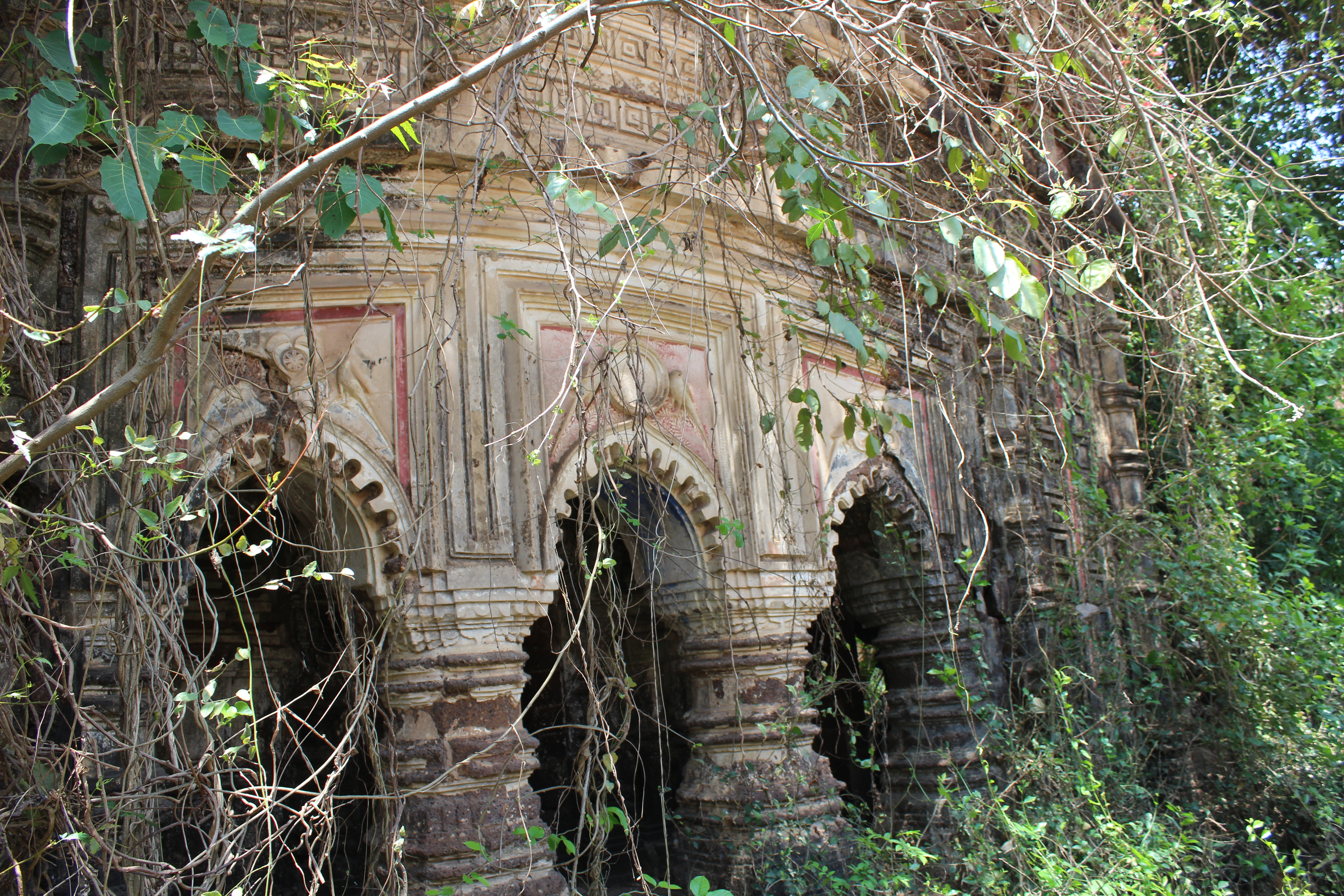
Memanpur: Vishnu temple built in 17th century (in picture).

== Healthcare ==
In 2014, Goghat II CD Block had 1 block primary health centre, 3 primary health centre and 2 private nursing homes with total 55 beds and 9 doctors (excluding private bodies). It had 27 family welfare subcentres. 4,508 patients were treated indoor and 272,732 patients were treated outdoor in the hospitals, health centres and subcentres of the CD Block.

Goghat II CD Block has Kamarpukur Rural Hospital (with 60 beds) at Kamarpukur, Jitarpur Primary Health Centre at PO Bhuskunda (with 2 beds), Taraghat PHC (with 10 beds) and Badanganj PHC (with 2 beds).
