= Kayapat =

- Village
- Location in West Bengal, India Kayapat (India)
- Coordinates: 22.904523°N 87.538172°E
- Country: India
- State: West Bengal
- District: Hooghly

Population (2011)
  - Total: 3,351

Languages
  - Official: Bengali, English
- Time zone: UTC+5:30 (IST)
- PIN: 712122
- Telephone/STD code: 03211
- Lok Sabha constituency: Arambagh
- Vidhan Sabha constituency: Goghat
- Website: hooghly.gov.in

Kayapat is a village in the Goghat II CD block in the Arambagh subdivision of Hooghly district in the Indian state of West Bengal.

== Geography ==
Cities and towns in Arambagh subdivision in Hooghly district
M: municipal city/ town, R: rural/ urban centre, H: historical/ religious centre
Owing to space constraints in the small map, the actual locations in a larger map may vary slightly

=== Area overview ===
The Arambagh subdivision, presented in the map alongside, is divided into two physiographic parts – the Dwarakeswar River being the dividing line. The western part is upland and rocky – it is extension of the terrain of neighbouring Bankura district. The eastern part is flat alluvial plain area. The railways, the roads and flood-control measures have had an impact on the area. The area is overwhelmingly rural with 94.77% of the population living in rural areas and the remaining 5.23% living in urban areas.

Note: The map alongside presents some of the notable locations in the subdivision. All places marked in the map are linked in the larger full screen map.

=== Location ===
Kayapat is located at 22.904523°N 87.538172°E

== Demographics ==
As per the 2011 Census of India, Kayapat had a total population of 3,351 of which 1,737 (52%) were males and 1,614 (48%) were females. Population in the age range 0–6 years was 340. The total number of literate persons in Kayapat was 2,578 (85.62% of the population over 6 years).

== Culture ==
David J. McCutchion mentions the Sridhara temple of Mondal family as having been built in 1807 as a nava ratna with rich terracotta façade. He also mentions a pancha ratna temple with terracotta decoration.

== Kayapat picture gallery ==
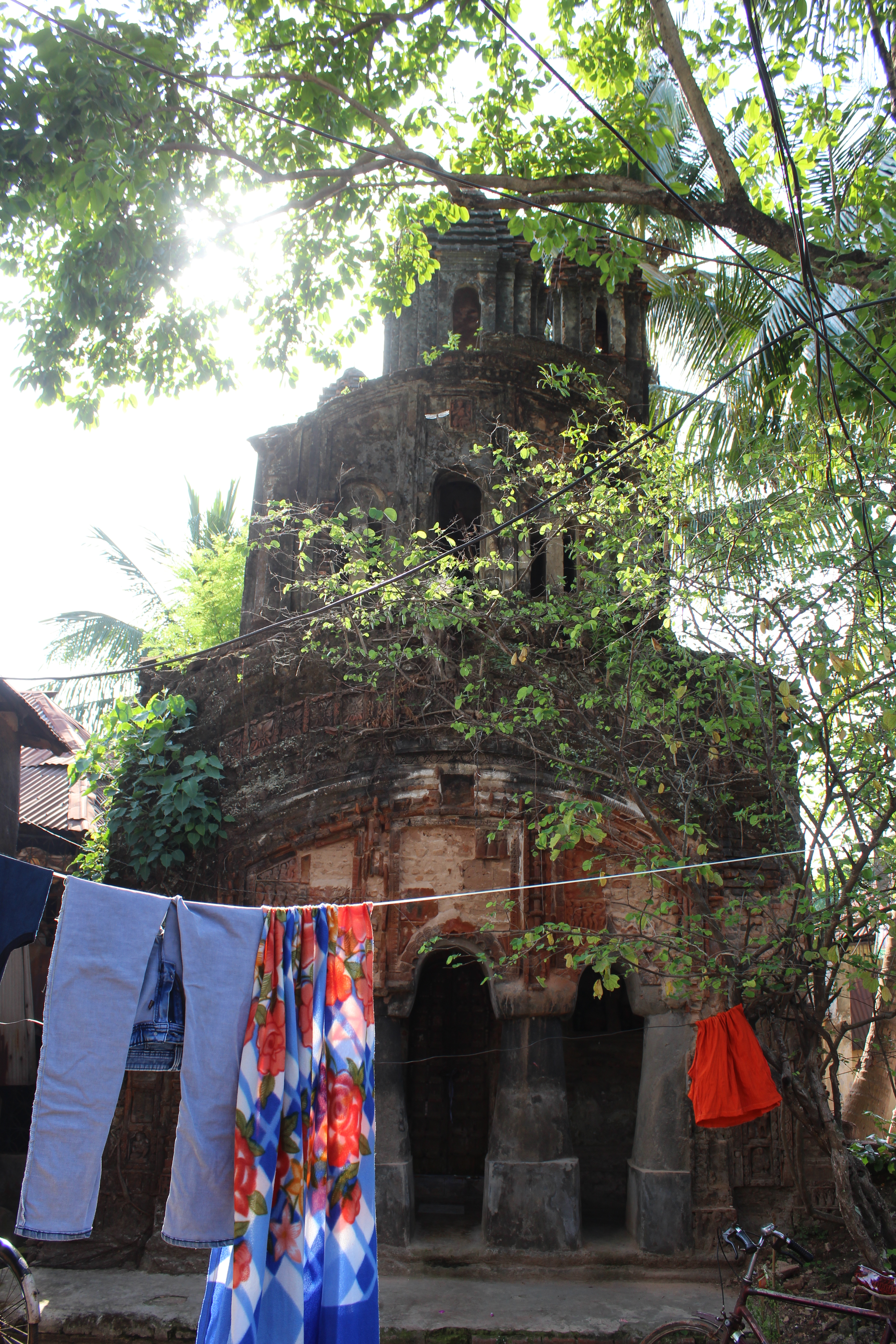
Sridhar Laljiu temple of Mondal family, built in 1807 (front side).

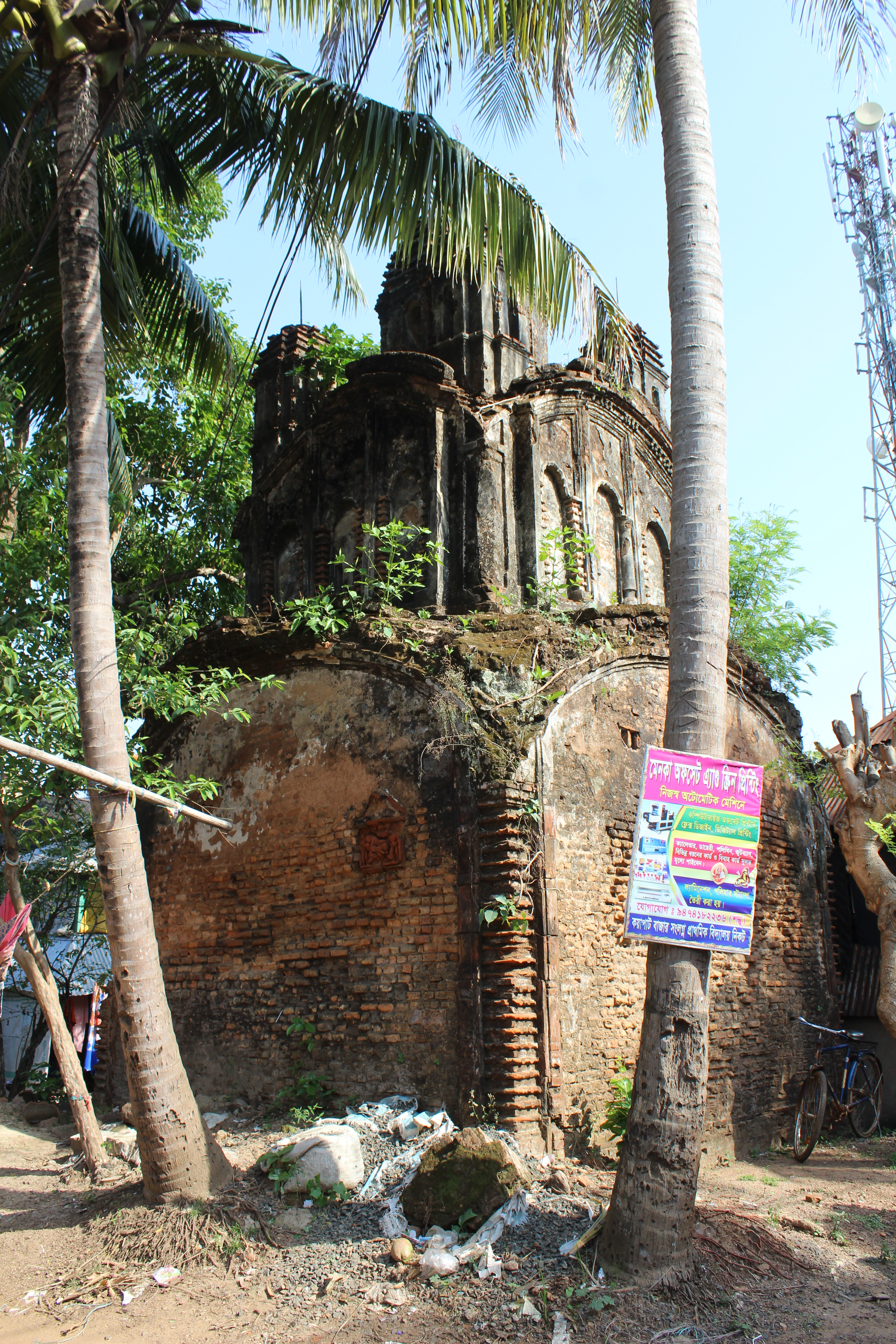
Sridhar Laljiu temple built as a nava ratna temple, now in a ruinous condition (rear side).

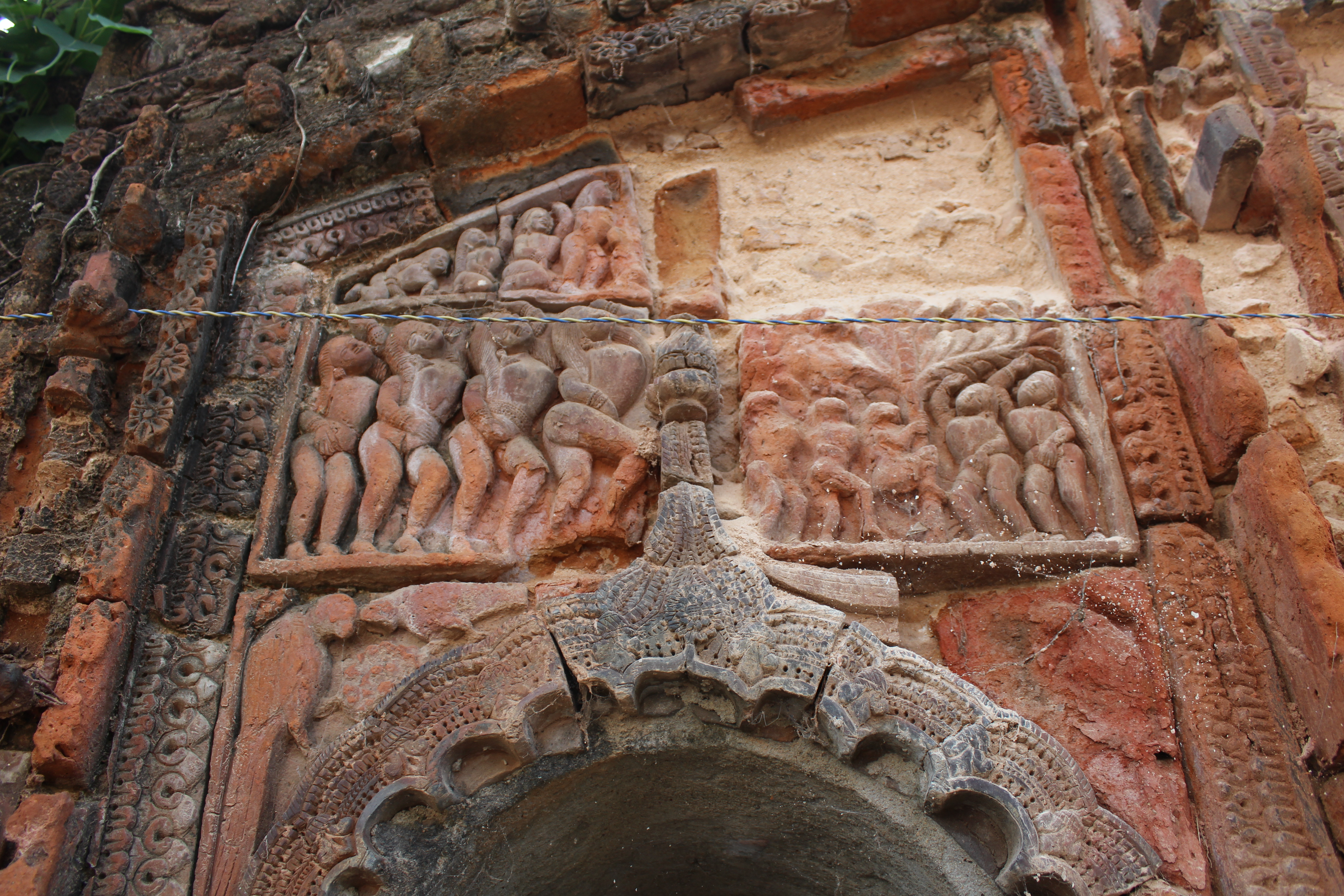
Crumbling terracotta designs at Sridhar Laljiu temple

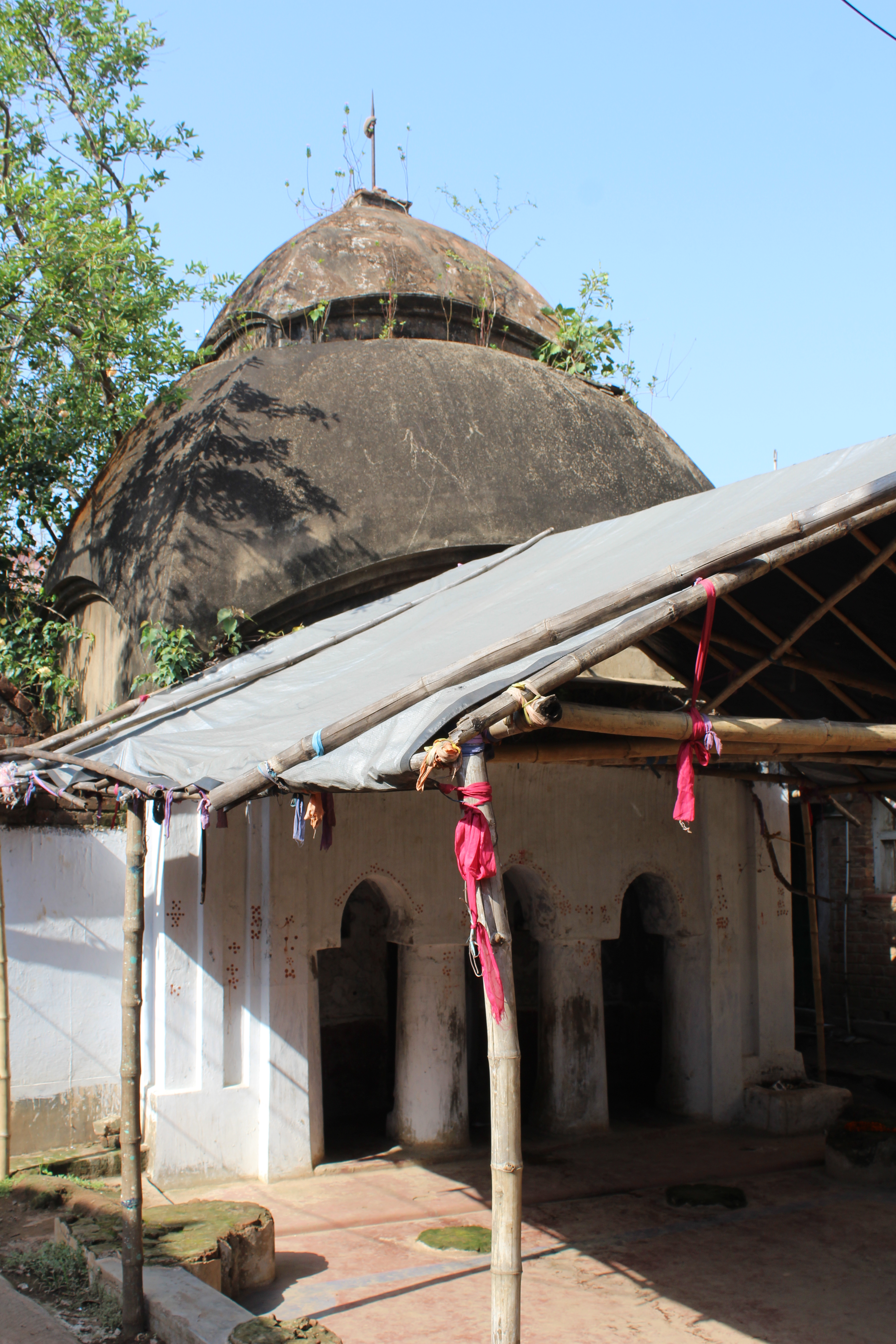
At chala temple adjacent to Sridhar Laljiu temple
