= Fului =

- Village
- Location in West Bengal, India Fului (India)
- Coordinates: 22.9111199°N 87.556972°E
- Country: India
- State: West Bengal
- District: Hooghly

Population (2011)
  - Total: 5,984

Languages
  - Official: Bengali, English
- Time zone: UTC+5:30 (IST)
- PIN: 712122
- Telephone/STD code: 03211
- Lok Sabha constituency: Arambagh
- Vidhan Sabha constituency: Goghat
- Website: hooghly.gov.in

Fului is a village in the Goghat II CD block in the Arambagh subdivision of Hooghly district in the Indian state of West Bengal.

== Geography ==
Cities and towns in Arambagh subdivision in Hooghly district
M: municipal city/ town, R: rural/ urban centre, H: historical/ religious centre
Owing to space constraints in the small map, the actual locations in a larger map may vary slightly

=== Location ===
Fului is located at 22.911199°N 87.55692°E

=== Area overview ===
The Arambagh subdivision, presented in the map alongside, is divided into two physiographic parts – the Dwarakeswar River being the dividing line. The western part is upland and rocky – it is the extension of the terrain of neighbouring Bankura district. The eastern part is flat alluvial plain area. The railways, the roads and flood-control measures have had an impact on the area. The area is overwhelmingly rural with 94.77% of the population living in rural areas and only 5.23% residing in urban areas.

Note: The map alongside presents some of the notable locations in the subdivision. All places marked in the map are linked in the larger full screen map.

== Demographics ==
As per the 2011 Census of India, Fului had a total population of 5,984 of which 3,064 (51%) were males and 2,920 (49%) were females. Population in the age range 0–6 years was 638. The total number of literate persons in Fului was 4,173 (78.06% of the population over 6 years).

== Fului picture gallery ==
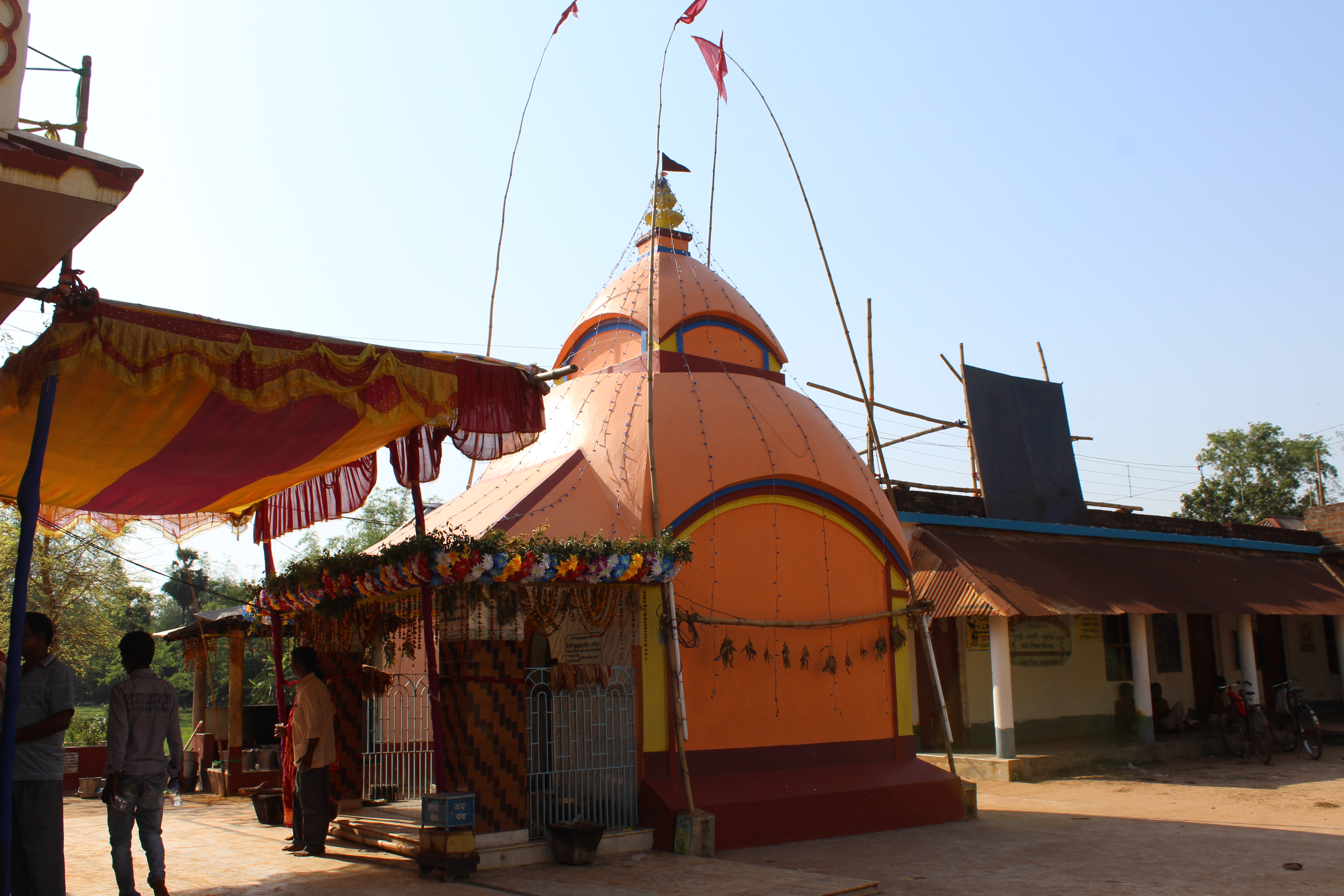
Fulleshwari temple, at chala, famous for its Gajan Utsab

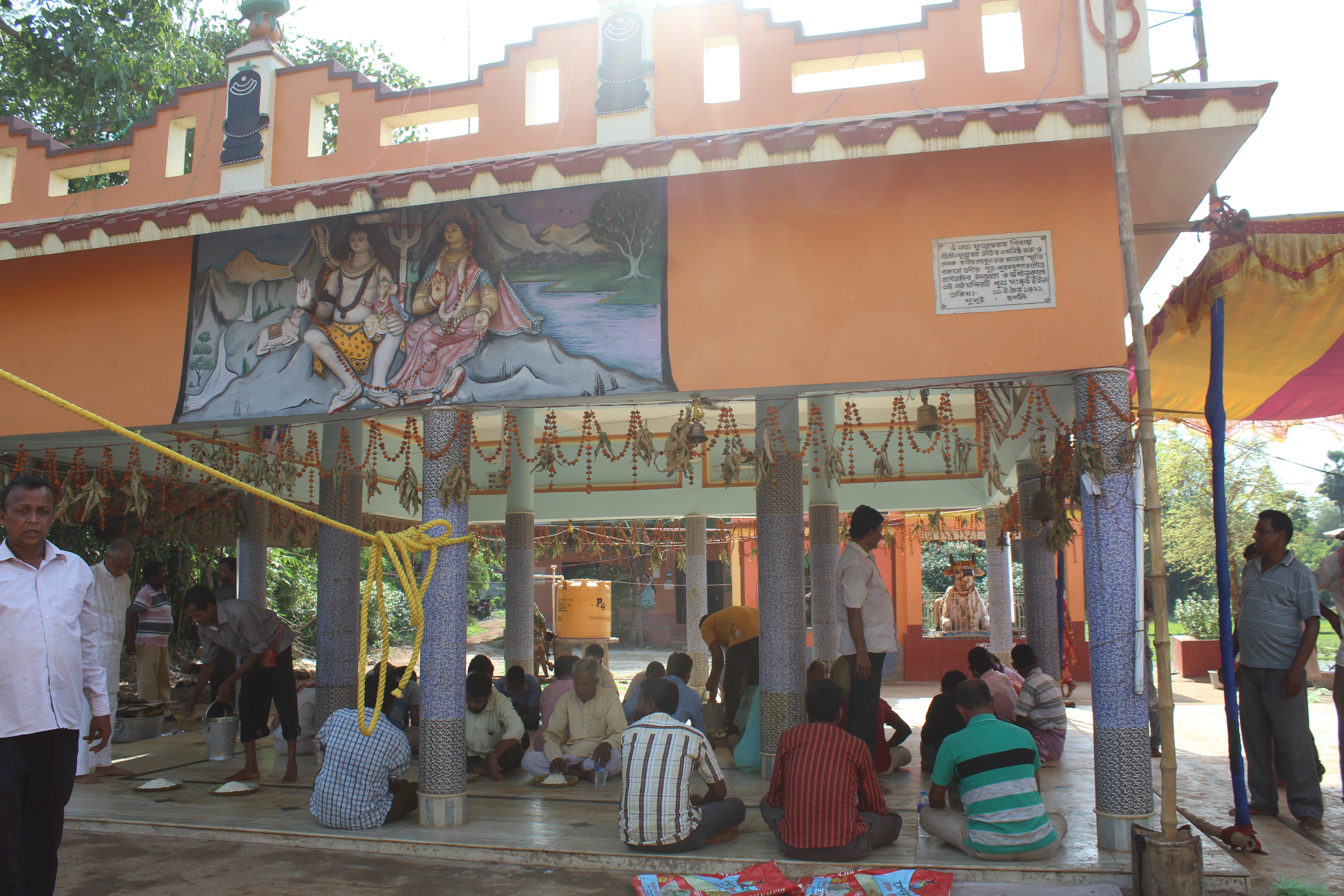
Natmadir
