= Satberia =

- Village
- Location in West Bengal, India Satberia (India)
- Coordinates: 22.901523°N 87.623872°E
- Country: India
- State: West Bengal
- District: Hooghly

Population (2011)
  - Total: 2,109

Languages
  - Official: Bengali, English
- Time zone: UTC+5:30 (IST)
- PIN: 712612
- Telephone/STD code: 03211
- Lok Sabha constituency: Arambagh
- Vidhan Sabha constituency: Goghat
- Website: hooghly.gov.in

Satberia is a village in the Goghat II CD block in the Arambagh subdivision of Hooghly district in the Indian state of West Bengal.

== History ==
Khudiram Chattopadhyay, father of Gadadhar Chattopadhyay (Ramakrishna) was a priest in the Raghubir temple at Satberia when Ramananda Rai was a zamindar here. (Photographer's note with the pictures).

== Geography ==
Cities and towns in Arambagh subdivision in Hooghly district
M: municipal city/ town, R: rural/ urban centre, H: historical/ religious centre
Owing to space constraints in the small map, the actual locations in a larger map may vary slightly

=== Area overview ===
The Arambagh subdivision, presented in the map alongside, is divided into two physiographic parts – the Dwarakeswar River being the dividing line. The western part is upland and rocky – it is extension of the terrain of neighbouring Bankura district. The eastern part is flat alluvial plain area. The railways, the roads and flood-control measures have had an impact on the area. The area is overwhelmingly rural with 94.77% of the population living in rural areas and 5.23% of the population living in urban areas.

Note: The map alongside presents some of the notable locations in the subdivision. All places marked in the map are linked in the larger full screen map.

=== Location ===
Satberia is located at 22.901523°N 87.623872°E

== Demographics ==
As per the 2011 Census of India, Satberia had a total population of 1,378 of which 725 (53%) were males and 653 (47%) were females. Population in the age range 0–6 years was 149. The total number of literate persons in Satberia was 957 (77.87% of the population over 6 years).

== Satberia picture gallery ==
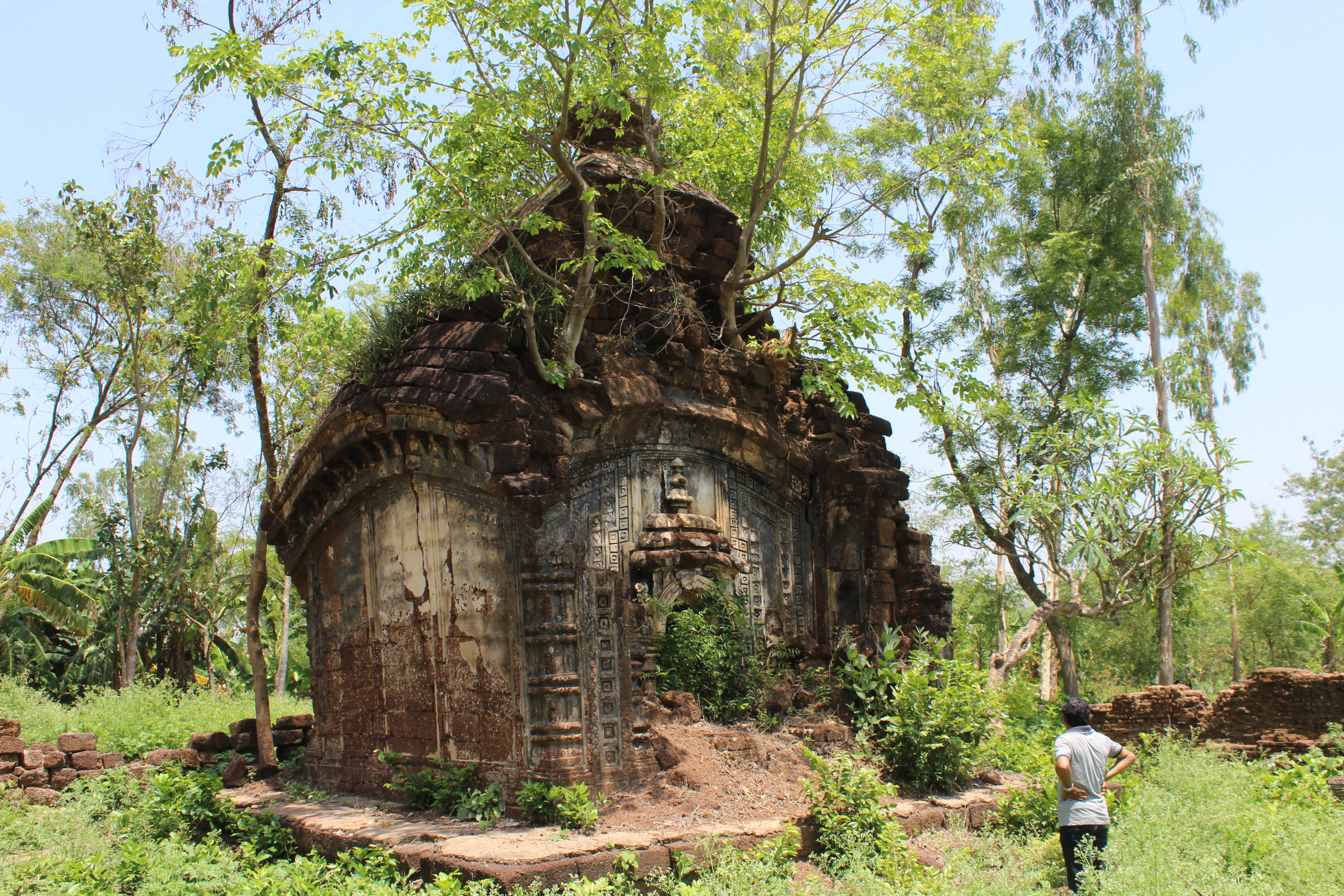
At chala Raghubir temple of the Rai family, laterite built. Picture taken in 2018.

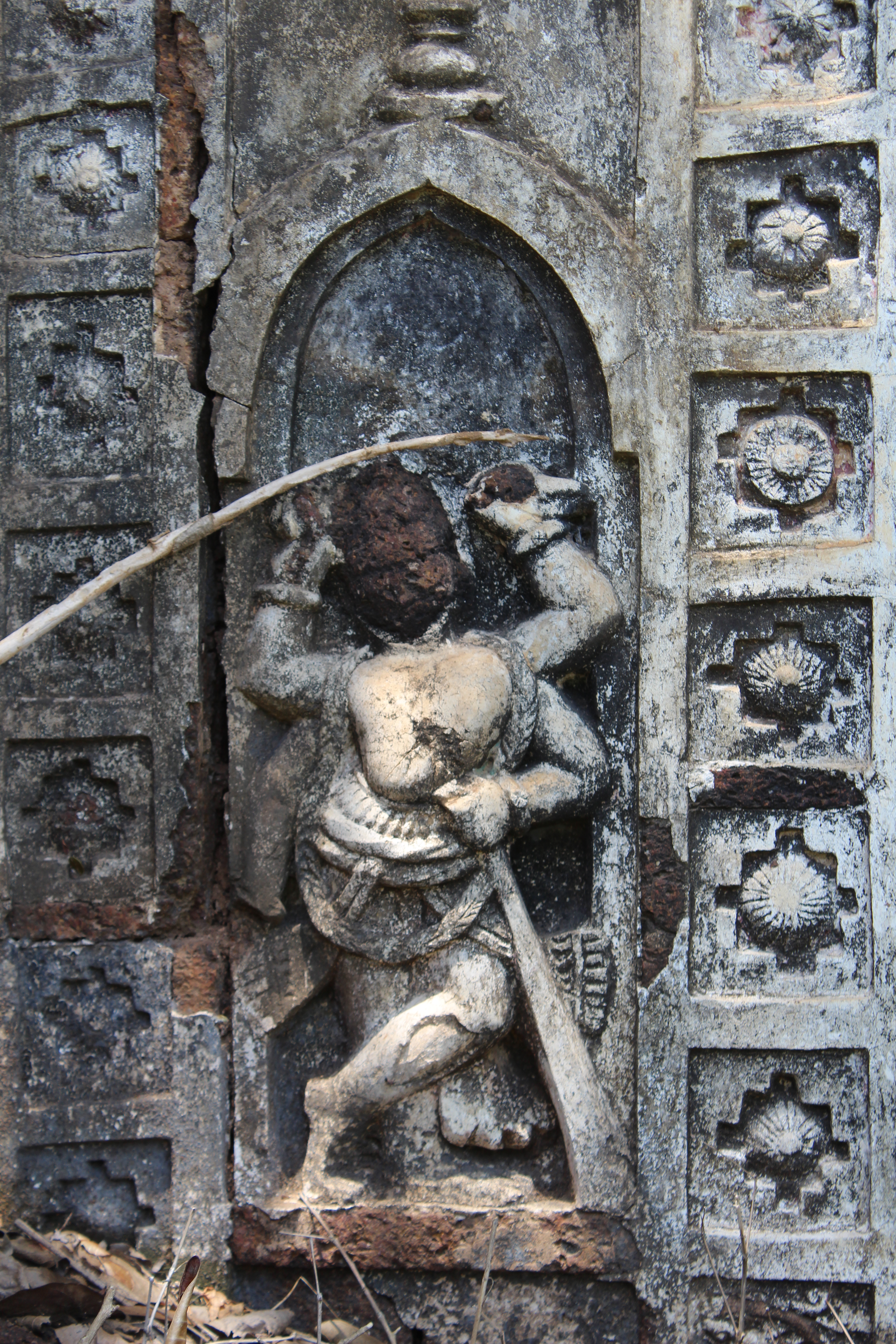
A decorative item

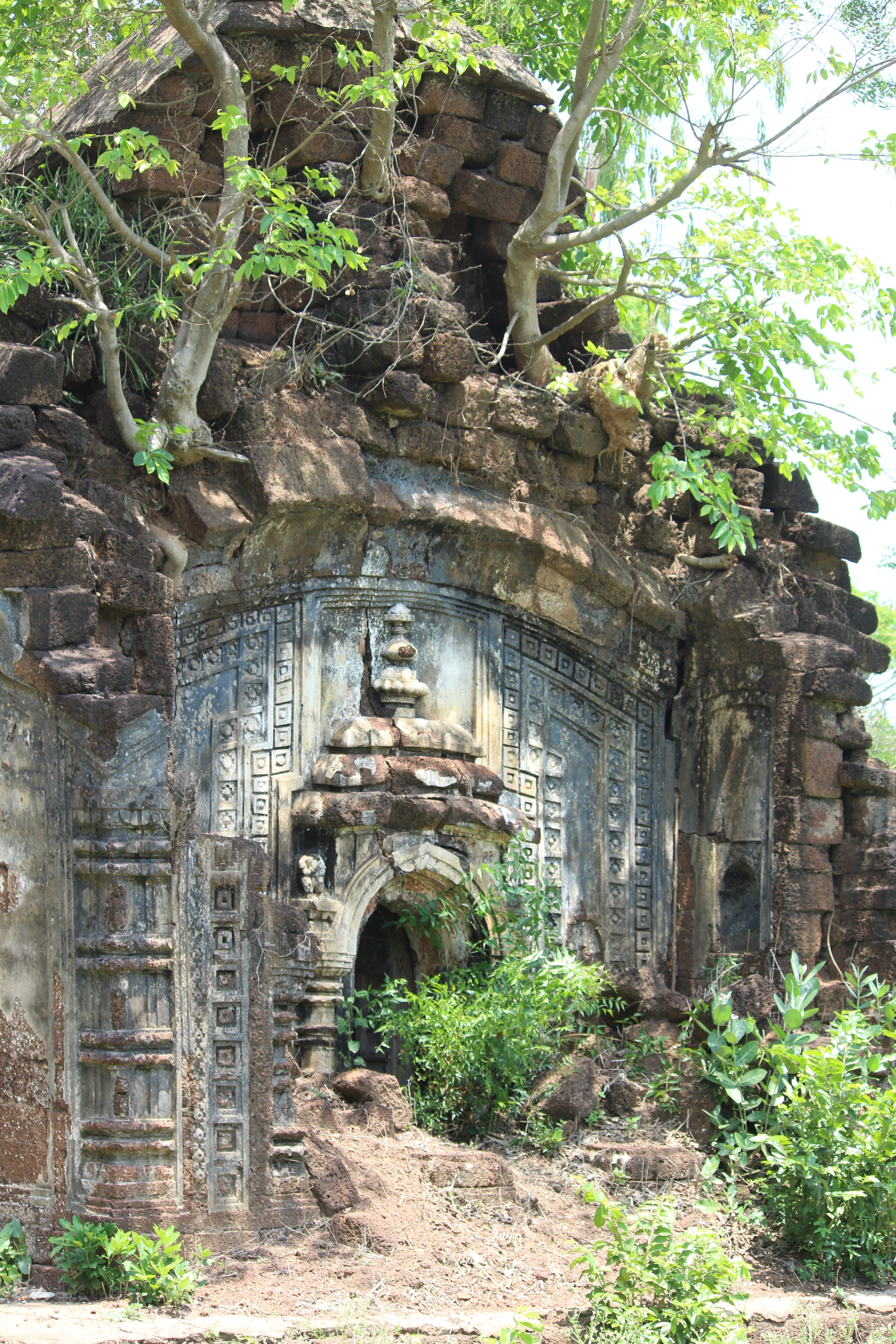
Close up of the façade
