= Badanganj =

- Village
- Location in West Bengal, India Badanganj (India)
- Coordinates: 22.903199°N 87.536972°E
- Country: India
- State: West Bengal
- District: Hooghly

Population (2011)
  - Total: 3,865

Languages
  - Official: Bengali, English
- Time zone: UTC+5:30 (IST)
- PIN: 712122
- Telephone/STD code: 03211
- Lok Sabha constituency: Arambagh
- Vidhan Sabha constituency: Goghat
- Website: hooghly.gov.in

Badanganj is a village in the Goghat II CD block in the Arambagh subdivision of Hooghly district in the Indian state of West Bengal.

== Geography ==
Cities and towns in Arambagh subdivision in Hooghly district
M: municipal city/ town, R: rural/ urban centre, H: historical/ religious centre
Owing to space constraints in the small map, the actual locations in a larger map may vary slightly

=== Area overview ===
The Arambagh subdivision, presented in the map alongside, is divided into two physiographic parts – the Dwarakeswar River being the dividing line. The western part is upland and rocky – it is extension of the terrain of neighbouring Bankura district. The eastern part is flat alluvial plain area. The railways, the roads and flood-control measures have had an impact on the area. The area is overwhelmingly rural with 94.77% of the population living in rural areas and 5.23% in urban areas.

Note: The map alongside presents some of the notable locations in the subdivision. All places marked in the map are linked in the larger full screen map.

=== Location ===
Badanganj is located at 22.903199°N 87.536972°E

== Demographics ==
As per the 2011 Census of India, Badanganj had a total population of 3,865 of which 1,957 (51%) were males and 1,908 (49%) were females. Population in the age range 0–6 years was 415. The total number of literate persons in Badanganj was 2,913 (84.43% of the population over 6 years).

== Culture ==
David J. McCutchion mentions:

- The Damodara temple as a West Bengal nava ratna with ridged turrets, with terracotta façade, built in 1810, measuring 16’ 6" square.
- The Sridhara Laljiu as a double-storied flat roofed, with terracotta designs, built in 1802, measuring 18’ 7" x 17’ 11".

== Badanganj picture gallery ==
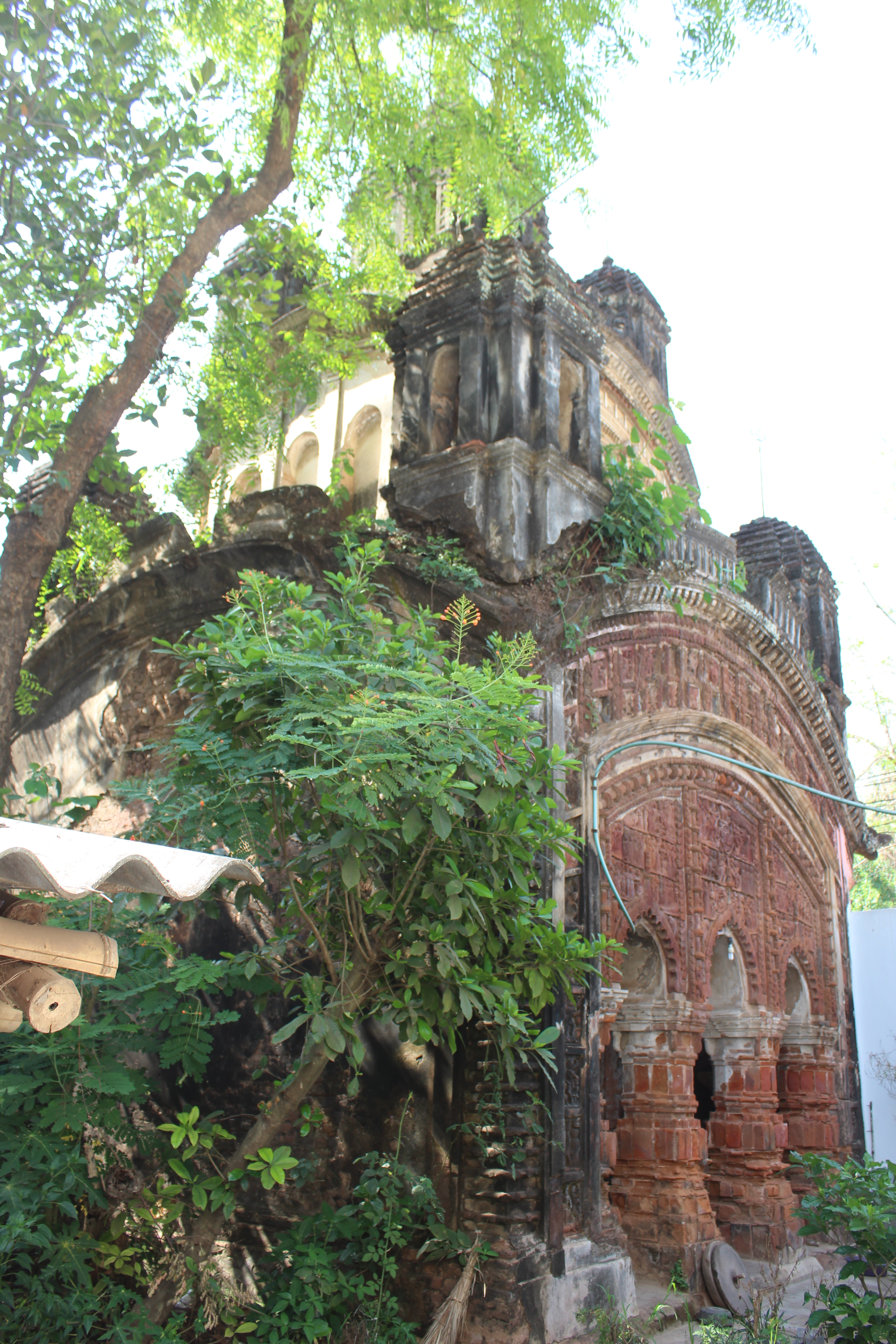
Damodara temple of Barat family built in 1810

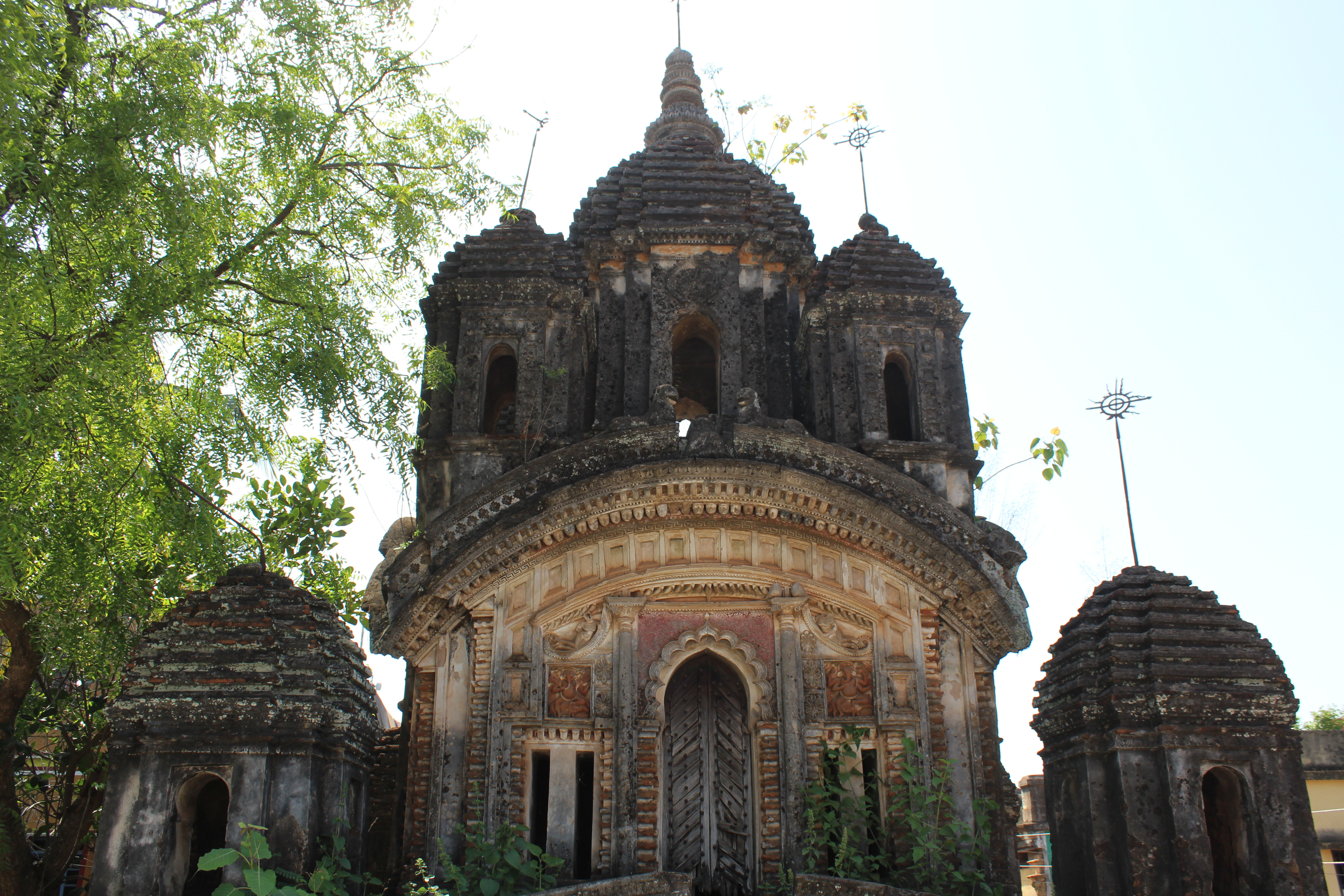
Damodara temple – nava ratna

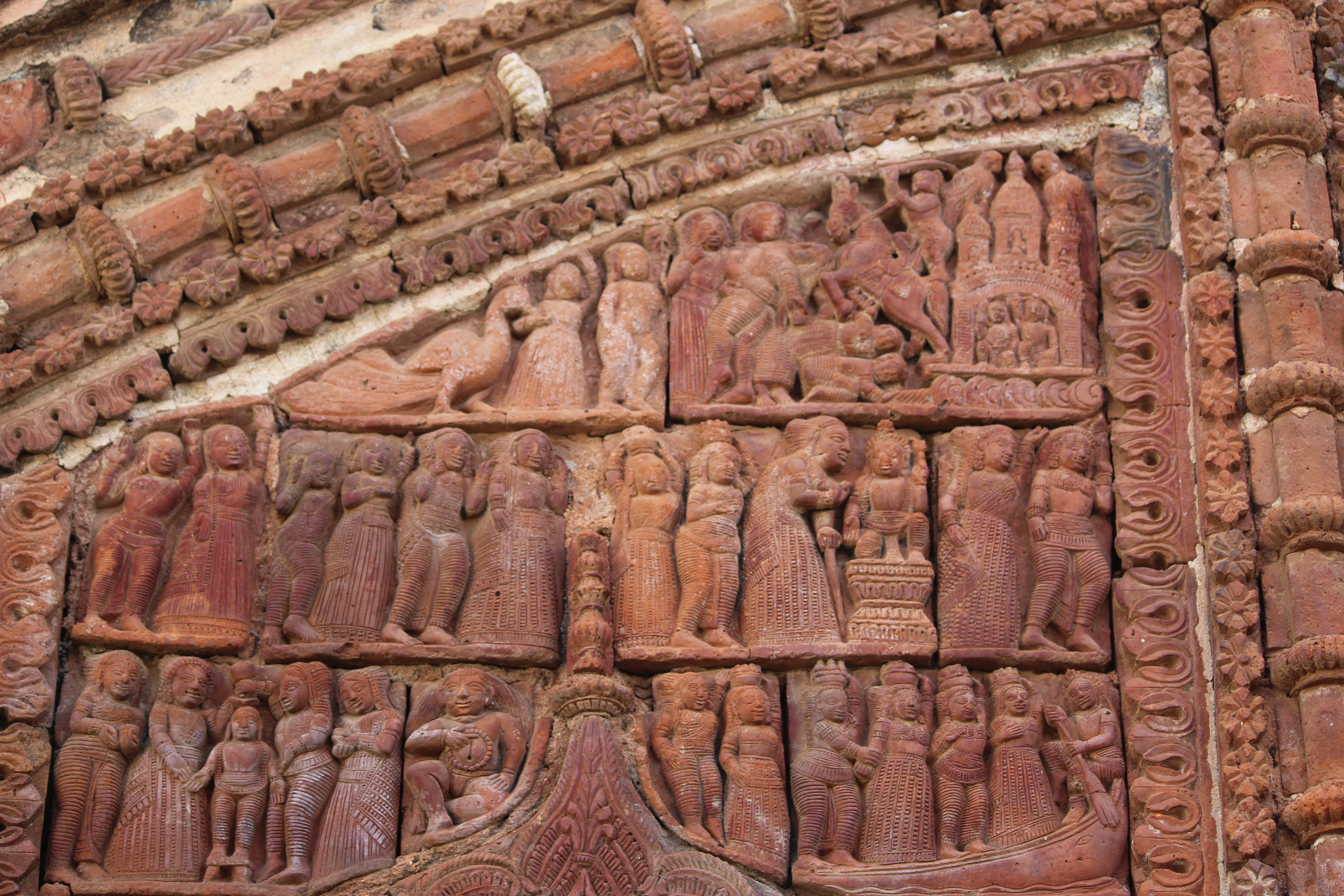
Terracotta relief in Damodara temple

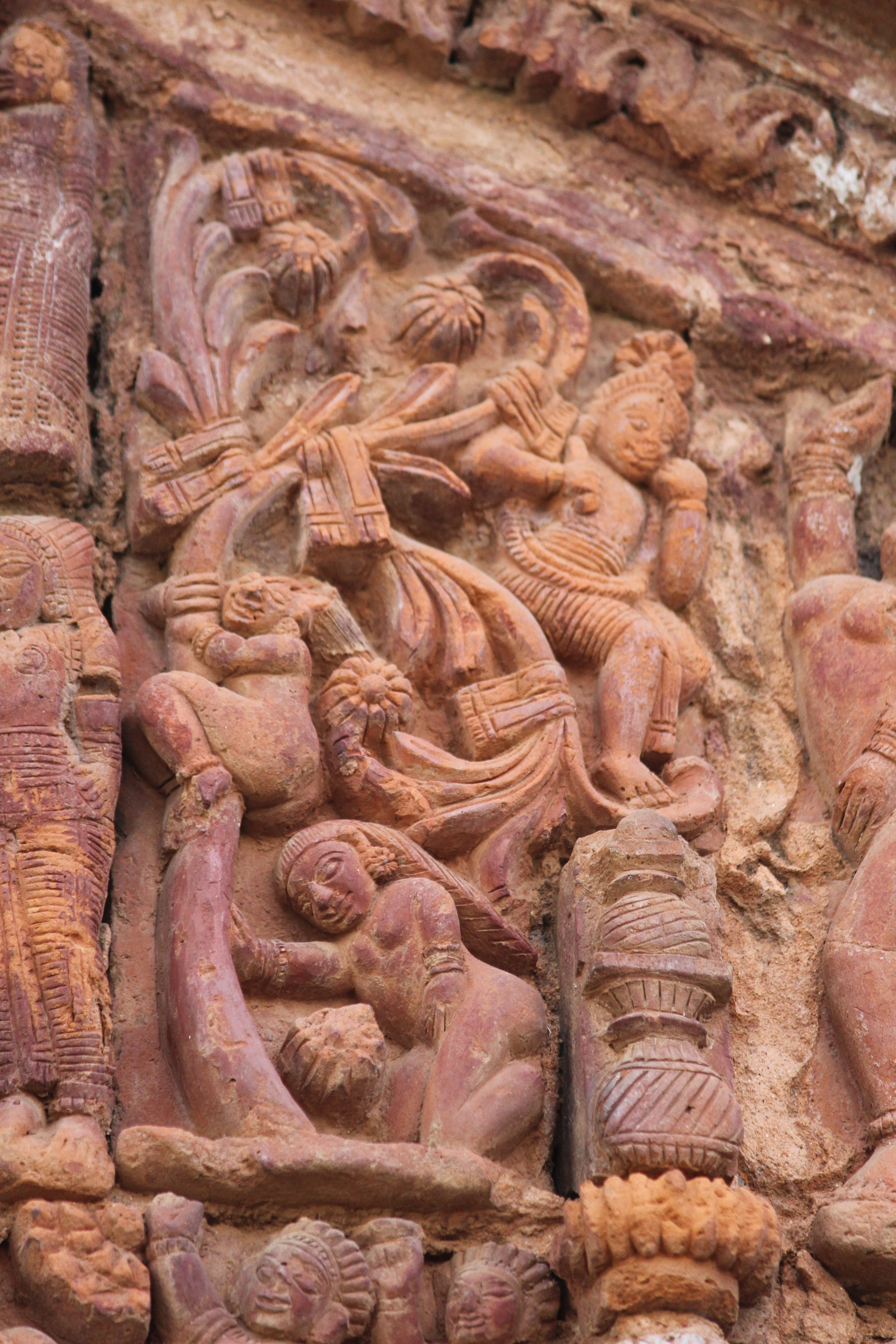
Terracotta relief in Damodara temple

== Healthcare ==
There is a Primary Health Centre at Badanganj, with 2 beds.
