= Ghanteshwar Temple =

Hindu temple in Hooghly

- Location in West Bengal

Religion
- Affiliation: Hinduism
- District: Hooghly

Location
- State: West Bengal
- Country: India
- Interactive map of Ghanteshwar Temple
- Coordinates: 22°42′38″N 87°51′15″E

Architecture
- Inscriptions: বীরভূমৌ সিদ্ধিনাথো রাঢ়েচাঃ তারকেশ্বর ঘন্টেশ্বরশ্চ দেবেশি রত্নাকর নদীতটে

Ghanteshwar temple is situated at Ubidpur Khanakul (near Khanakul I block office) Hooghly, West Bengal India on the bank of river Ratnakar, which is now virtually dead. Lord Shiva is the mainly worshipped deity here.

The temple complex also hosts many other deities like Durga, Kaal Bhairav, Surya, Kaali, Shashti, Sitala, Dharmaraj, Radha Krishna, Annapurna, Shani etc. It also hosts a shrine for Sufi Pir (Peer) Baba. It is home to many Bengal folk festivals like Neel Puja, Gajan, Shivratri, Bhimekadashi and Ratha Yatra.

Main entrance of the temple complex has below inscription:

বীরভূমৌ সিদ্ধিনাথো রাঢ়েচাঃ তারকেশ্বর (Birbhumau Siddhinatho Radhechah Tarakeswar)

ঘন্টেশ্বরশ্চ দেবেশি রত্নাকর নদীতটে

Locals believe that the same shiva linga is being worshipped for over 500 years. The temple complex as seen today is said to be created by local Zamindar (Landlord) Bipin Bihari Sinha in 1943 when a flood caused major damage to the earlier construction.

== Mumbai temple ==
There is a Ghanteshwar temple in Mumbai also. It is near the exit of Madhu park and devotees tie bells in the temple.

== Transport ==
Nearby rail stations are Tarakeswar, Arambagh or Mayapur (Hooghly).

The temple is easily accessible via road transportation. The bus routes are:

- Arambagh - Garerghat
- Arambagh - Ganeshpur
- Tarakeswar - Garerghat
- Tarakeswar - Ganeshpur
- Burdwan - Garerghat (via Arambagh)

One travelling from Ghatal side can come to Ranichak, take the river transportation to Garerghat and avail buses from there. From Bagnan/Amta side, buses are available from Jhikira/Muchighata to Ganeshpur.
