= Deva Prasad Sarbadhikari =

- দেবপ্রসাদ সর্বাধিকারী
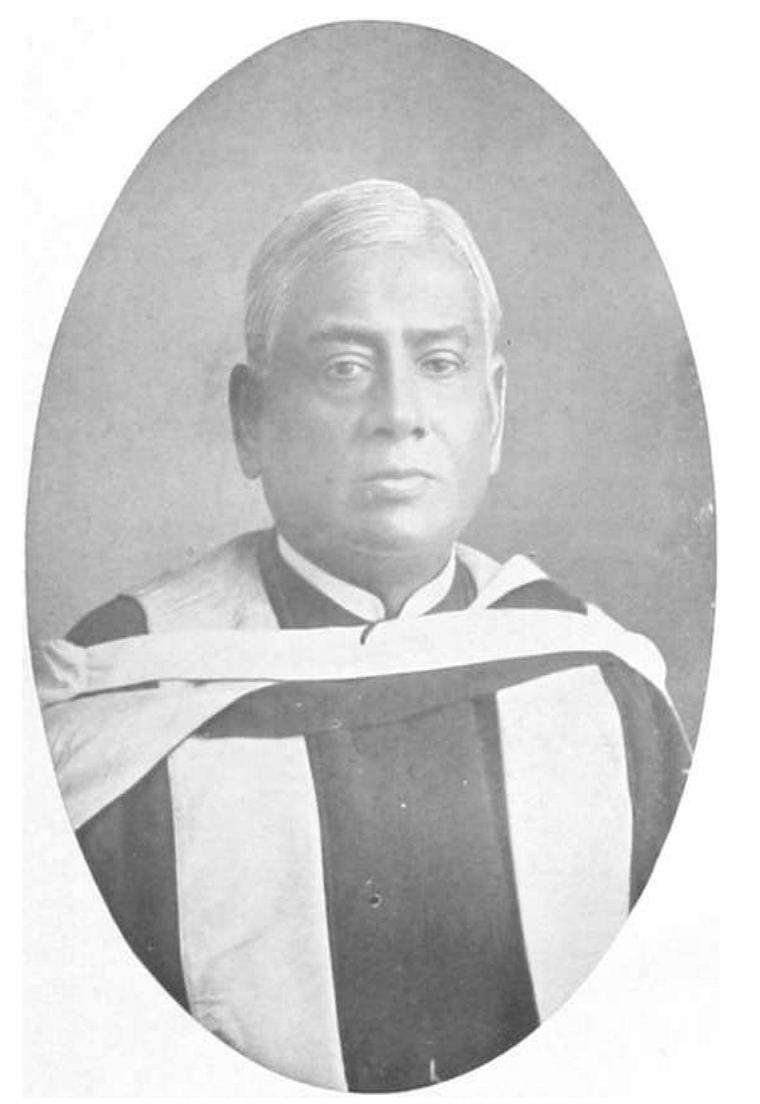
- Born: 1862; Radhanagar, Khanakul, Bengal Presidency, British India
- Died: 11 August 1935 (aged 73); Calcutta, Bengal Presidency, British India
- Education: Presidency College, Calcutta University
- Occupations: lawyer, politician educationist, writer
- Parent(s): Suya Kumar Sarbadhikari (father); Hemlata Sarbadhikari (mother)

Sir Deva Prasad Sarvadhikari (or Deba Prasad Sarbadhikary) (1862 – 11 August 1935) was an Indian lawyer, educationist and a vice chancellor of Calcutta University.

Sarvadhikari came from a wealthy family of Radhanagar in Bengal and was the son of Dr. Soorji Coomar Sarvadhikari, G.M.C.B., Rai Bahadur, who was a naval surgeon in British employment during the 1857 rebellion. Sarvadhikari was educated at the Sanskrit College, the Hare School and Presidency College receiving an MA in 1882 and a BL 1883. He then became a solicitor in 1888. He became a fellow of the University of Calcutta and was a representative at the Congress of the Universities of the Empire held in London in 1911. He was give honorary degrees by the Universities of St Andrews and Aberdeen. In 1914, he succeeded Sir Ashutosh Mukerjee as vice-chancellor and served until 1918.
