= Khanakul II =

- Community development block
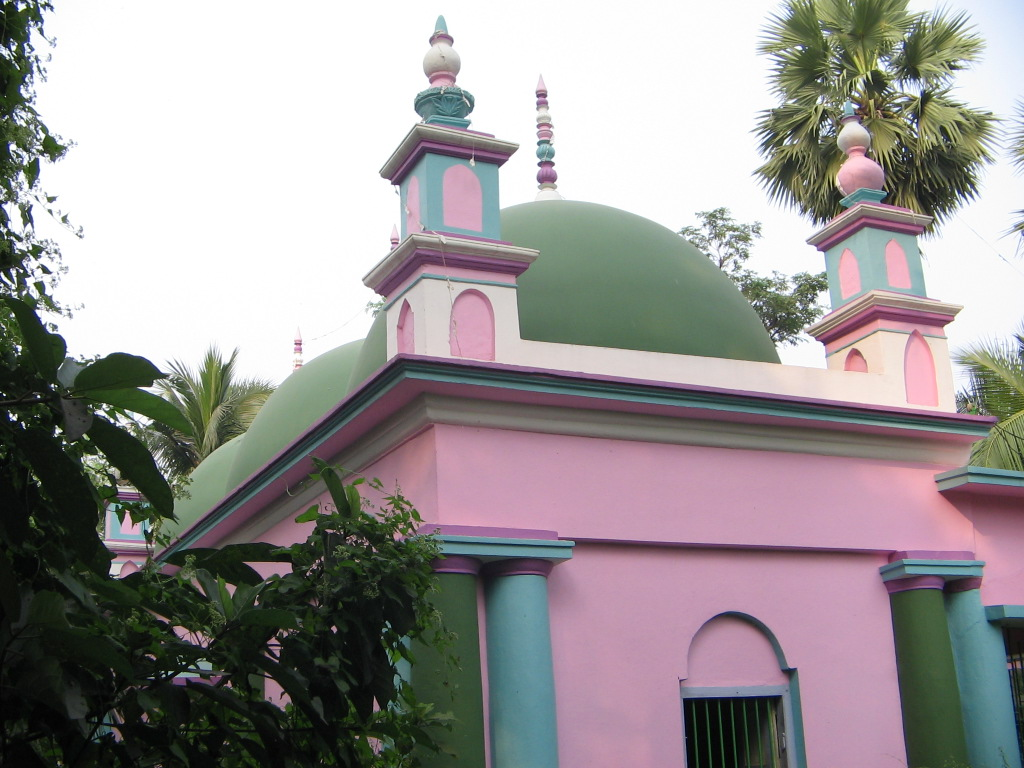
- Dargahi Para Mosque, Khanakul II
- Interactive map of Khanakul II
- Coordinates: 22.6615021°N 87.8980064°E
- Country: India
- State: West Bengal
- District: Hooghly

Government
  - Type: Representative democracy

Area
  - Total: 121.83 km^{2} (47.04 sq mi)
- Elevation: 6 m (20 ft)

Population (2011)
  - Total: 184,734
  - Density: 1,516.3/km^{2} (3,927.3/sq mi)

Languages
  - Official: Bengali, English
- Time zone: UTC+5:30 (IST)
- PIN: 712417 (Rajhati Bandar), 712416 (Natibpur), 712406 (Khanakul)
- STD: 03211
- Vehicle registration: WB-15, WB-16, WB-18
- Literacy: 79.16%
- Lok Sabha constituency: Arambagh
- Vidhan Sabha constituency: Khanakul
- Website: hooghly.gov.in

Khanakul II is a community development block that forms an administrative division in Arambag subdivision of Hooghly district in the Indian state of West Bengal.

== Overview ==
The Khanakul II CD Block is part of the Dwarakeswar-Damodar inter-riverine plain with alluvial soil. The Mundeswari flows through the region, carrying water from the Damodar and joins the Rupnarayan at the tri-junction of the Hooghly, Howrah and Purba Medinipur districts. It is a flood prone area.

== Geography ==
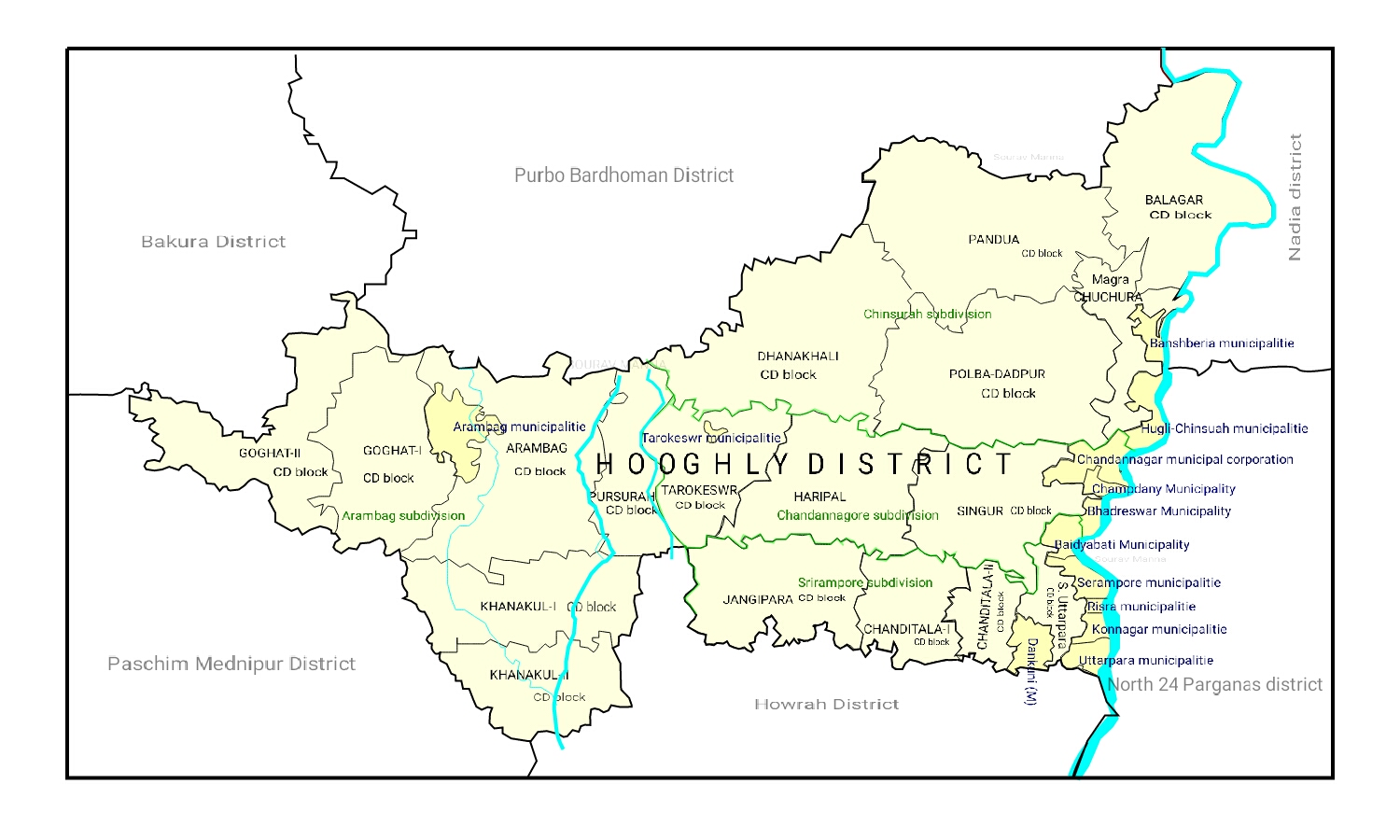
Map of Hooghly district showing CD blocks and municipal areas

Map of Khanakul II CD block Sowing GP areas

Natibpur, a constituent panchayat of Khanakul II block, is located at 22°39′41″N 87°53′53″E.

Khanakul II CD Block is bounded by Khanakul I CD Block in the north, Udaynarayanpur CD Block, in Howrah district, in the east, Amta II CD Block, in Howrah district, in the south, and Daspur II and Ghatal CD Blocks, in Paschim Medinipur district, in the west.

It is located 72 km from Chinsurah, the district headquarters.

Khanakul II CD Block has an area of 121.83 km^{2}. It has 1 panchayat samity, 11 gram panchayats, 145 gram sansads (village councils), 53 mouzas and 52 inhabited villages. Khanakul police station serves this block. Headquarters of this CD Block is at Khanakul.

Gram panchayats of Khanakul II block/ panchayat samiti are: Chingra, Dhanyaghori, Jagatpur, Marokhana, Natibpur I, Natibpur II, Palaspai I, Palaspai II, Rajhati I, Rajhati II and Sabal Singhapur.

== Demographics ==
=== Population ===
As per the 2011 Census of India, Khanakul II CD Block had a total population of 184,734, all of which were rural. There were 93,379 (51%) males and 90,755 (49%) females. Population below 6 years was 22,035. Scheduled Castes numbered 55,544 (30.07%) and Scheduled Tribes numbered 29 (0.02%).

As per the 2001 census, Khanakul II block had a total population of 160,861, out of which 79,564 were males and 81,297 were females. Khanakul II block registered a population growth of 6.90 per cent during the 1991-2001 decade. Decadal growth for Hooghly district was 15.72 per cent. Decadal growth in West Bengal was 17.84 per cent.

Large villages (with 4,000+ population) in Khanakul II CD Block are (2011 census figures in brackets): Hirapur (5,486), Ramchandrapur (5,299), Kaknan (5,833), Dhanyaghari (5,482), Ghoradaha (6,707), Jagatpur (7,142), Bara Nandanpur (4,763), Nandanpur (7,778), Marakhana (5,526), Hayatpur (7,805), Harish Chak (9,705), Sabalsinghapur (10,109), Rajhati (6,677), Routkhana (6,114), Ranjitbati (4,208), Chinra (12,924), Natibpur (6,466), Balpai (5,856), Palashpai (6,450) and Mostafapur (5,670).

=== Literacy ===
As per the 2011 census the total number of literates in Khanakul II CD Block was 128,790 (79.16% of the population over 6 years) out of which males numbered 71,206 (86.12% of the male population over 6 years) and females numbered 57,584 (71.96% of the female population over 6 years). The gender disparity (the difference between female and male literacy rates) was 14.16%.

As per the 2001 census, Khanakul II block had a total literacy of 49.27 per cent. While male literacy was 72.54 per cent, female literacy was 38.76 per cent.

See also – List of West Bengal districts ranked by literacy rate

Literacy in CD blocks of
Hooghly district
Arambagh subdivision
Arambagh – 79.10
Khanakul I – 77.73
Khanakul II – 79.16
Goghat I – 78.70
Goghat II – 77.24
Pursurah – 82.12
Chandannagar subdivision
Haripal – 78.59
Singur – 84.01
Tarakeswar – 79.96
Chinsurah subdivision
Balagarh – 76.94
Chinsurah Mogra – 83.01
Dhaniakhali – 75.66
Pandua – 75.86
Polba Dadpur – 75.14
Srirampore subdivision
Chanditala I – 83.76
Chanditala II – 84.78
Jangipara – 75.34
Sreerampur Uttarpara – 87.33
Source: 2011 Census: CD Block Wise
Primary Census Abstract Data

=== Language and religion ===
Religion in Khanakul II CD block (2011)
| Hinduism | 84.21% |
| Islam | 15.67% |
| Other or not stated | 0.12% |

As per the 2011 census, majority of the population of the district belong to the Hindu community with a population share of 82.9% followed by Muslims at 15.8%. The percentage of the Hindu population of the district has followed a decreasing trend from 87.1% in 1961 to 82.9% in the latest census 2011. On the other hand, the percentage of Muslim population has increased from 12.7% in 1961 to 15.8% in 2011 census.

In 2011 census Hindus numbered 155,566 and formed 84.21% of the population in Khanakul II CD Block. Muslims numbered 28,946 and formed 15.67% of the population. Others numbered 222 and formed 0.12% of the population.

Bengali is the predominant language, spoken by 99.95% of the population.

== Administration ==
=== Zilla Parishad ===
Khanakul II has 3 Zilla Parishad seats. The latest elections were held in July 2023 where the BJP won 2 seats and the Trinamool Congress won 1 seat.

| Zilla Parishad | ZP No. | Councillor | Party | Remarks |
|---|---|---|---|---|
| Khanakul-II | 51 | Kashinath Mondal | Trinamool Congress | |
| Khanakul-II | 52 | Susanta Ghosh | Bharatiya Janata Party | |
| Khanakul-II | 53 | Kalipada Adhikari | Bharatiya Janata Party | |

=== Panchayat Samiti ===
Khanakul II Panchayat Samiti has 33 wards. The latest elections were held in July 2023 where the BJP captured this block from the Trinamool Congress by winning a simple majority of 18 wards against Trinamool's 15.

Chairperson: Rumpa Mondal
Deputy Chairperson: Arun Mohish
| Gram Panchayat | No. | Councillor | Party | Remarks |
|---|---|---|---|---|
| Rajhati-I | 1 | Dipali Bag | Trinamool Congress | |
| Rajhati-I | 2 | Amit Changdar | Trinamool Congress | |
| Rajhati-I | 3 | Joytsna Buduk | Trinamool Congress | |
| Dhannyaghori | 4 | Anup Dolui | Bharatiya Janata Party | |
| Dhannyaghori | 5 | Rumpa Mondal | Bharatiya Janata Party | |
| Dhannyaghori | 6 | Rabindranath Patel | Bharatiya Janata Party | |
| Jagatpur | 7 | Bishnupriya Kanji | Bharatiya Janata Party | |
| Jagatpur | 8 | Kabita Maity | Bharatiya Janata Party | |
| Jagatpur | 9 | Tarun Maji | Bharatiya Janata Party | |
| Rajhati-II | 10 | Mithun Santra | Bharatiya Janata Party | |
| Rajhati-II | 11 | Rama Patra | Bharatiya Janata Party | |
| Rajhati-II | 12 | Uma Ghosh | Bharatiya Janata Party | |
| Natibpur-I | 13 | Munshi Firoz Ahamed | Trinamool Congress | |
| Natibpur-I | 14 | Haridas Charchari | Trinamool Congress | |
| Natibpur-I | 15 | Bijali Lahari | Trinamool Congress | |
| Chingra | 16 | Arun Mohish | Bharatiya Janata Party | |
| Chingra | 17 | Kajali Mondal | Bharatiya Janata Party | |
| Chingra | 18 | Radharani Biswas | Bharatiya Janata Party | |
| Palaspai-I | 19 | Pratap Bag | Trinamool Congress | |
| Palaspai-I | 20 | Umesh Adhikari | Bharatiya Janata Party | |
| Palaspai-I | 21 | Babita Dey | Trinamool Congress | |
| Natibpur-II | 22 | Rupali Karmakar | Bharatiya Janata Party | |
| Natibpur-II | 23 | Mushtaq Ali Mallick | Trinamool Congress | |
| Natibpur-II | 24 | Janakinath Adak | Bharatiya Janata Party | |
| Sabalsinghapur | 25 | Ajmira Begum | Trinamool Congress | |
| Sabalsinghapur | 26 | Shabnam Khatun | Trinamool Congress | |
| Sabalsinghapur | 27 | Iqbal Hossain Khan | Trinamool Congress | |
| Marokhana | 28 | Soumen Mondal | Bharatiya Janata Party | |
| Marokhana | 29 | Kakoli Santra | Bharatiya Janata Party | |
| Marokhana | 30 | Sujata Mondal | Bharatiya Janata Party | |
| Palaspai-II | 31 | Nur Nabi Mandal | Trinamool Congress | |
| Palaspai-II | 32 | Utpal Das | Trinamool Congress | |
| Palaspai-II | 33 | Karunamoy Jana | Trinamool Congress | |

=== Gram Panchayats ===
Khanakul II Panchayat Samiti has 11 villages or gram panchayats. The latest elections were held in July 2023 where the BJP won majority of the villages.

| No. | Gram Panchayat | Total Seats | | | | | | | Majority |
| No. | Gram Panchayat | Total Seats | AITC | BJP | Sanjukta Morcha | | | Others | Majority |
| No. | Gram Panchayat | Total Seats | AITC | BJP | CPI(M) | INC | ISF | Others | Majority |
| 1 | Rajhati-I | 18 | 9 | 9 | 0 | | | 0 | Tied |
| 2 | Dhannyaghori | 18 | 2 | 16 | 0 | | | 0 | BJP |
| 3 | Jagatpur | 20 | 2 | 18 | 0 | | | 0 | BJP |
| 4 | Rajhati-II | 14 | 2 | 12 | 0 | | | 0 | BJP |
| 5 | Natibpur-I | 11 | 8 | 3 | 0 | | | 0 | AITC |
| 6 | Chingra | 18 | 6 | 12 | 0 | | | 0 | BJP |
| 7 | Palaspai-I | 14 | 6 | 7 | 1 | 0 | | 0 | BJP |
| 8 | Natibpur-II | 14 | 5 | 9 | 0 | | | 0 | BJP |
| 9 | Sabalsinghapur | 18 | 12 | 6 | 0 | | | 0 | AITC |
| 10 | Marokhana | 21 | 5 | 15 | 0 | | | 1 | BJP |
| 11 | Palaspai-II | 13 | 10 | 3 | 0 | | | 0 | AITC |
| Total | | 179 | 67 | 110 | 1 | 0 | 0 | 1 | |

== Rural poverty ==
As per poverty estimates obtained from household survey for families living below poverty line in 2005, rural poverty in Khanakul II CD Block was 16.47%.

== Economy ==
=== Livelihood ===
Livelihood
in Khanakul II CD Block
1. Cultivators (19.1%)
2. Agricultural labourers (29.2%)
3. Household industries (7.68%)
4. Other Workers (43.9%)

In Khanakul II CD Block in 2011, amongst the class of total workers, cultivators formed 19.14%, agricultural labourers 29.25%, household industry workers 7.68% and other workers 43.93%.

=== Infrastructure ===
There are 52 inhabited villages in Khanakul II CD Block. 100% villages have power supply. All 52 villages have more than one source of drinking water (tap, well, tube well, hand pump). 5 villages have sub post offices. 47 villages have landlines, 47 villages have public call offices and 51 villages have mobile phone coverage. 32 villages have pucca roads and 16 villages have bus service (public/ private). 19 villages have agricultural credit societies and 6 villages have commercial/ co-operative banks.

Important Handicrafts of Hooghly District
- Zari Work on Sari - Pandua, Pursurah, Jangipara, Tarakeswar and other blocks - 3,000 families involved
- Chikon Embroidery – Babnan, Pandua, Singur - 2,500 families involved
- Silk and Cotton Printing – Serampore (Chanditala) - 300 families involved
- Brass and Bell Metal – Manikpat, Goghat, Arambagh - 150 families involved
- Conch Shell – Pandua, Khanakul, Makla, Chandannagar
- Jute Diversified Product – Baidyabati, Mogra
- Terracota – Chinsurah, Chandannagar, Baidyabati, Mogra

Source:District Human Development Report 2010: Hooghly P. 67

=== Agriculture ===
Some of the primary and other hats or markets in the Khanakul II CD Block are: Bander market, Magareenga market, Morarkhana market, Natibpur hat, Rajhati market, Balipur hat, Chatrasati hat, Melam market, Krishnanagar market, Modharanga market, Marakhena market, Thakrani Chawk and 24-pore hat.

The Tebhaga movement launched in 1946, in 24 Parganas district, aimed at securing for the share-croppers a better position within the existing land relation structure. Although the subsequent Bargadari Act of 1950 recognised the rights of bargadars to a higher share of crops from the land that they tilled, it was not implemented fully. Large tracts, beyond the prescribed limit of land ceiling, remained with the rich landlords. From 1977 onwards major land reforms took place in West Bengal. Land in excess of land ceiling was acquired and distributed amongst the peasants. Following land reforms land ownership pattern has undergone transformation. In 2013-14, persons engaged in agriculture in Khanakul II CD Block could be classified as follows: bargadars 20.93%, patta (document) holders 3.60%, small farmers (possessing land between 1 and 2 hectares) 0.48%, marginal farmers (possessing land up to 1 hectare) 33.36% and agricultural labourers 41.63%.

Khanakul II CD Block had 96 fertiliser depots, 39 seed stores and 49 fair price shops in 2013-14.

In 2013-14, Khanakul II CD Block produced 1,102 tonnes of Aman paddy, the main winter crop from 823 hectares, 16,374 tonnes of Boro paddy (spring crop) from 6,129 hectares, 114 tonnes of Aus paddy (summer crop) from 52 hectares, 24 tonnes wheat from 9 hectares, 23,090 tonnes of jute from 1,207 hectares and 15,076 tonnes of potatoes from 2,000 hectares. It also produced pulses and oilseeds.

In 2013-14, the total area irrigated in Khanakul II CD Block was 7,261 hectares, out of which 2,000 hectares were irrigated by canal water, 850 hectares by tank water, 2,960 hectares by river lift irrigation, 720 hectares by deep tube wells and 731 hectares by shallow tube wells.

=== Banking ===
In 2013-14, Khanakul II CD Block had offices of 5 commercial banks and 3 gramin banks.

== Transport ==
Khanakul II CD Block has 11 ferry services and 4 originating/ terminating bus routes. The nearest railway station is 25 km from CD Block headquarters.

== Education ==
In 2013-14, Khanakul II CD Block had 150 primary schools with 12,132 students, 7 middle schools with 700 students, 14 high schools with 8,804 students and 8 higher secondary schools with 11,985 students. Khanakul II CD Block had 254 institutions for special and non-formal education with 8,462 students

In Khanakul II CD Block, amongst the 52 inhabited villages, all villages have schools, 48 villages had more than 1 primary school, 24 villages had at least 1 primary and 1 middle school and 18 villages had at least 1 middle and 1 secondary school.

== Healthcare ==
In 2014, Khanakul II CD Block had 1 block primary health centre, 3 primary health centre and 1 private nursing home with total 40 beds and 5 doctors (excluding private bodies). It had 28 family welfare subcentres. 1,412 patients were treated indoor and 316,145 patients were treated outdoor in the hospitals, health centres and subcentres of the CD Block.

Khanakul II CD Block is one of the areas of Hooghly district where ground water is affected by moderate level of arsenic contamination. The WHO guideline for arsenic in drinking water is 10 mg/ litre, and the Indian Standard value is 50 mg/ litre. In Hooghly district, 16 blocks have arsenic levels above WHO guidelines and 11 blocks above Indian standard value. The maximum concentration in Khanakul II CD Block is 137 mg/litre.
