= Shrirampur, Arambagh =

Srirampur
- Village
- Location in West Bengal, India Srirampur (India)
- Coordinates: 22.823667°N 87.961278°E
- Country: India
- State: West Bengal
- District: Hooghly

Population (2011)
  - Total: 7,490

Languages
  - Official: Bengali, English
- Time zone: UTC+5:30 (IST)
- PIN: 712105
- Telephone/STD code: 03212
- Lok Sabha constituency: Arambagh
- Vidhan Sabha constituency: Pursurah
- Website: hooghly.gov.in

Srirampur is a village in the Pursurah CD block in the Arambagh subdivision of Hooghly district in the Indian state of West Bengal.

== Geography ==
The Arambagh subdivision, presented in the map alongside, is divided into two physiographic parts – the Dwarakeswar River being the dividing line. The western part is upland and rocky – it is extension of the terrain of neighbouring Bankura district. The eastern part is a flat alluvial plain area. The railways, the roads and flood-control measures have had an impact on the area. The area is overwhelmingly rural with 94.77% of the population living in rural areas and 5.23% of the population living in urban areas.

== Demographics ==
As per the 2011 Census of India, Shrirampur had a total population of 7,490 of which 3,798 (51%) were males and 3,692 (49%) were females. Population in the age range 0–6 years was 726. The total number of literate persons in Shrirampur was 5,739 (84.85% of the population over 6 years).

== Healthcare ==
Akra Shrirampur Rural Hospital, with 30 beds, is the major government medical facility in Pursurah CD block.

== Transport ==
Shrirampur is located not too far away from West Bengal State Highway 2, which runs to the north of the village. Netaji Subhas Chandra Bose International Airport in Kolkata is the closest major commercial airport.
