= Bhupendra Nath Bose =

Indian politician

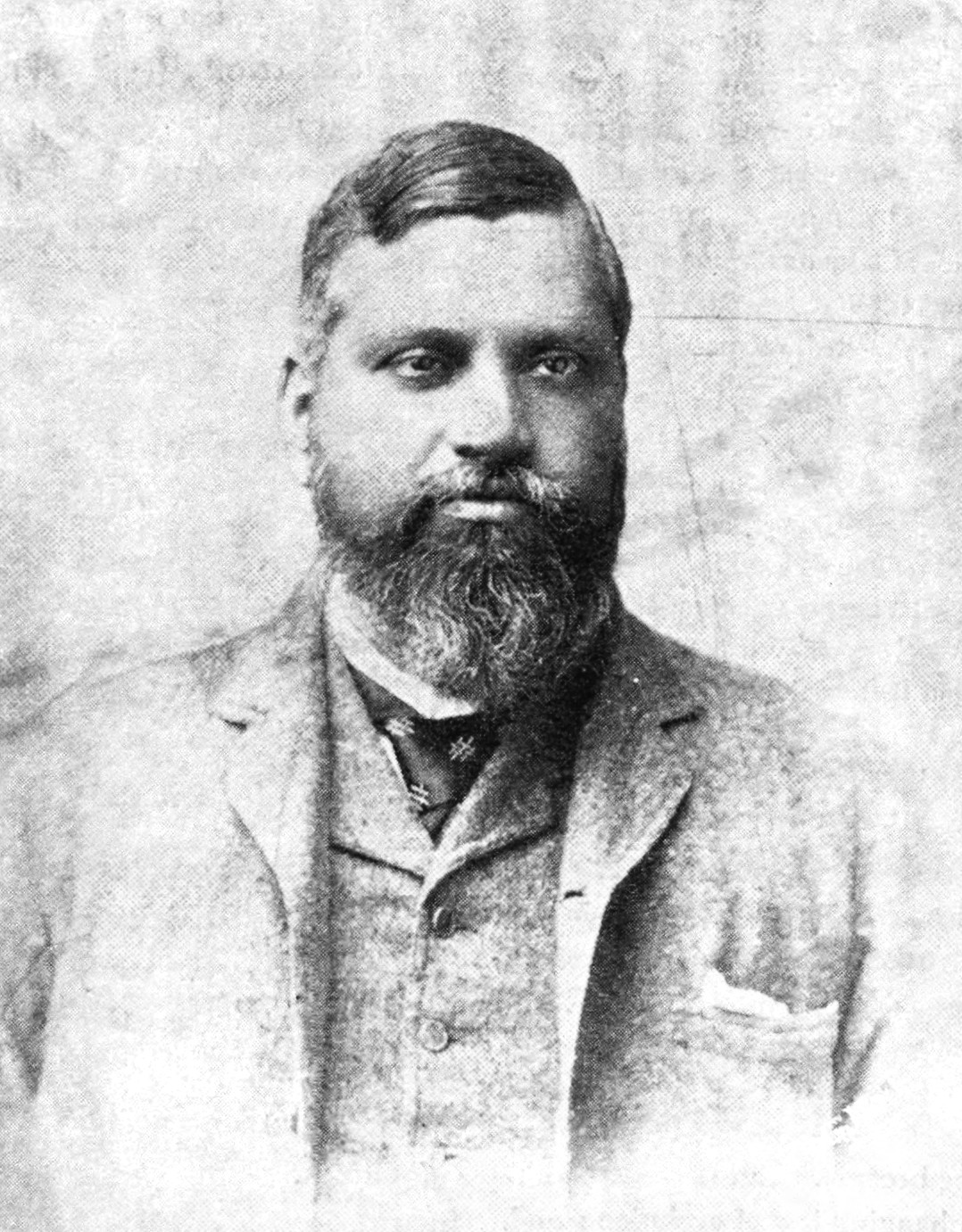
- Bhupendra Nath Bose, first President of Mohun Bagan AC.

Vice-Chancellor of University of Calcutta, B.N.Basu and Company (Law Firm) (Founder)

Personal details
- Born: 13 January 1859 Radhanagar, Hooghly, Bengal Presidency, British India
- Died: 13 September 1924 (aged 65) Calcutta, West Bengal, India
- Party: President of the Indian National Congress in 1914 at Madras session

Bhupendra Nath Bose (13 January 1859 – 13 September 1924) was an Indian politician and president of the Indian National Congress in 1914.

== Life and works ==
Bose was born in Radhanagar, Bengal Presidency in 1859. He graduated from the Presidency College, Calcutta in 1880. He completed his master's degree in 1881 and his law degree in 1883. He founded the law firm B.N. Basu and Company, whose office is still located at Temple Chambers in Kolkata.

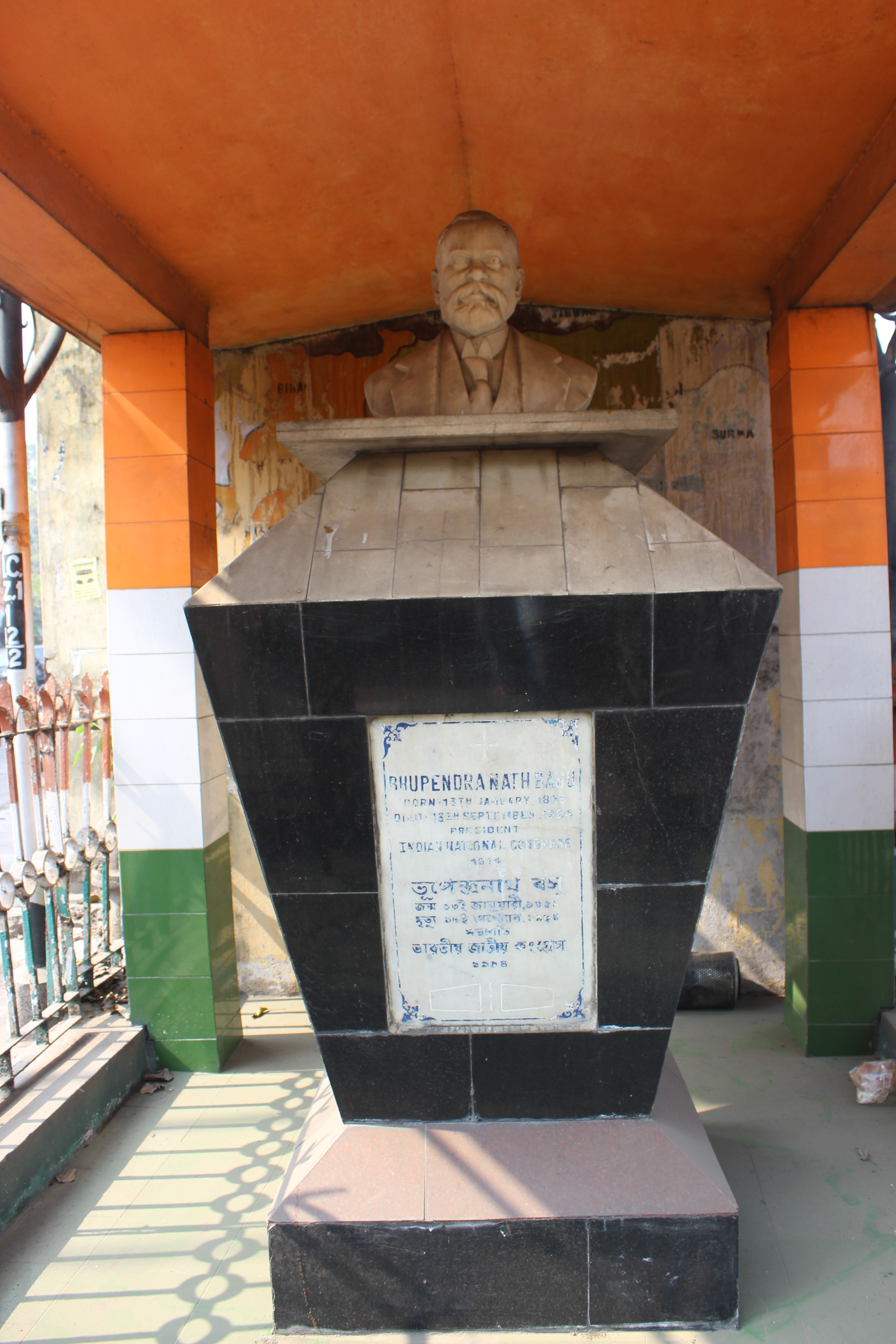

From 1904 to 1910, Bose was a member of the Bengal Legislature. During this period, he was involved in the nationalist movement. In 1905 he presided over the Bengal Provincial Conference held at Mymensingh. He joined the anti-partition agitation and campaign against British goods throughout Bengal. He opposed the passing of the Press Act in 1910. He became the president of the Indian National Congress in 1914.

Bose was a member and under-secretary in the council of the secretary of state for India from 1917 to 1923. In 1923, he was made a member of the executive council of the governor of Bengal. He then became the vice-chancellor of the University of Calcutta.

On 15 August 1889, Bose joined a meeting at a house in Balaram Ghosh Street in Calcutta, where Mohun Bagan Sporting Club (now Mohun Bagan AC) was founded. He became first president of Mohun Bagan AC. He died in 1924, aged 65.

== References and sources ==
Sources

- Bhupendra Nath Bose
- Bhattacharya, Ayan (10 September 2023). বাংলা ভাগের ক্ষত কিভাবে বিষিয়ে দিল মোহনবাগান আর ইস্টবেঙ্গলকে? [How did the wound of the partition of Bengal poisoned both Mohun Bagan and East Bengal?]. inscript.me (in Bengali). Kolkata: ইনস্ক্রিপ্ট বাংলা নিউজ. Archived from the original on 7 November 2023.
