= Kulbatpur =

- Village
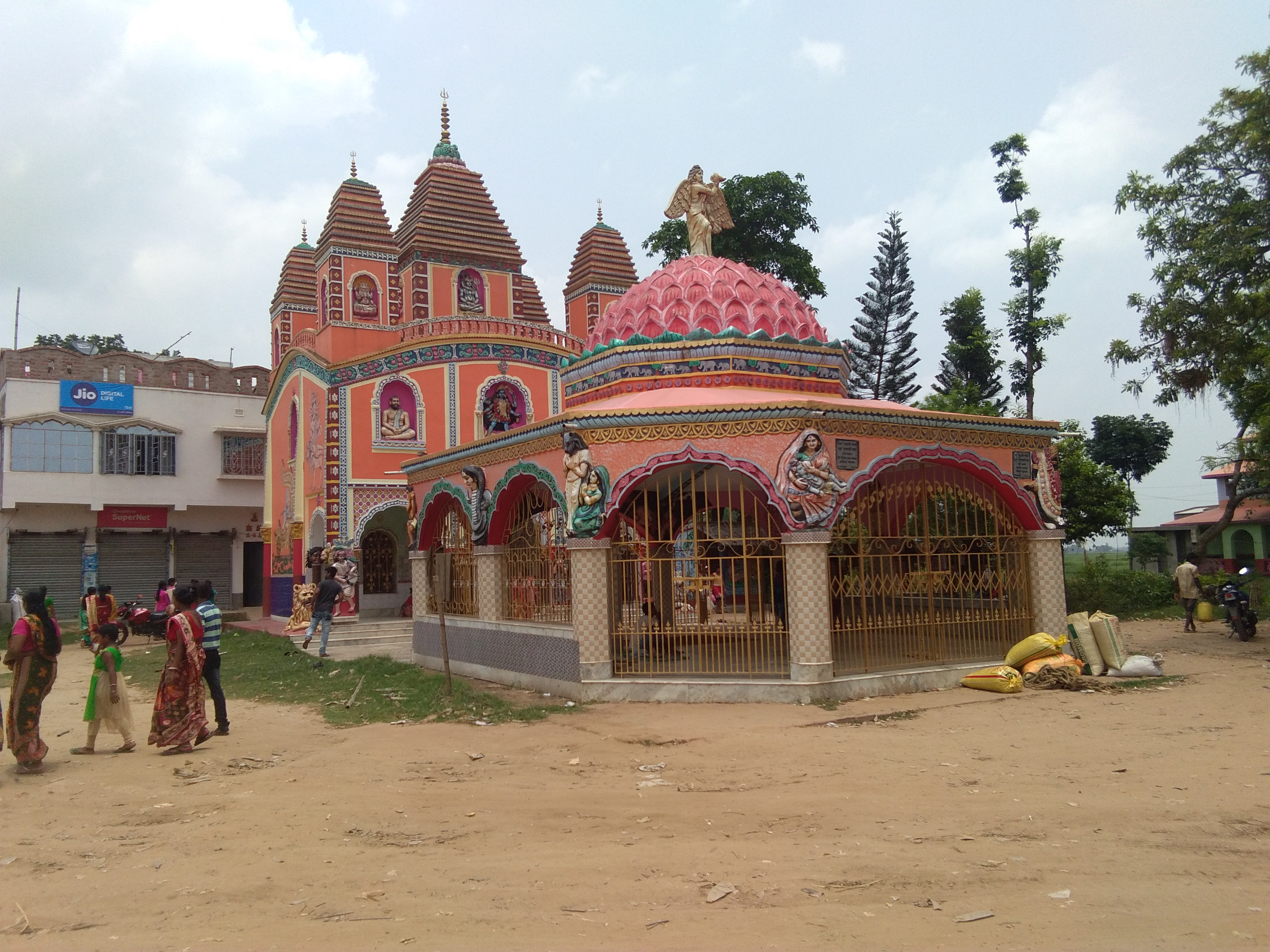
- Kulbatpur Kali Temple

- MAP OF KULBATPUR

- Location in West Bengal, India Kulbatpur (India)
- Coordinates: 22.8911449°N 87.93428°E
- Country: India
- State: West Bengal
- District: Hooghly
- Nearest City: Tarakeswar

Area
  - Total: 2 km^{2} (0.77 sq mi)

Population (2011)
  - Total: 4,038
  - Density: 2,000/km^{2} (5,200/sq mi)

Languages
  - Official: Bengali,
- Time zone: UTC+5:30 (IST)
- Telephone code: 712414
- ISO 3166 code: IN-WB
- Lok Sabha constituency: Arambagh
- Vidhan Sabha constituency: Pursurah

Kulbatpur is a village in Pursurah community development block of Arambagh subdivision in Hooghly District in the Indian state of West Bengal. It is 7 km from Tarakeswar .

== Geography ==
Kulbatpur is located in Hooghly district in Indian state of West Bengal with coordinates 22°53′28″N 87°56′03″E

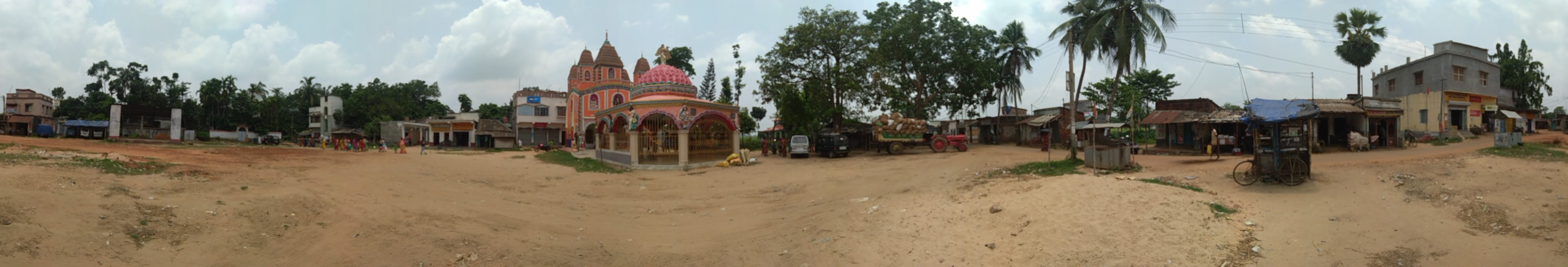
Kulbatpur Kalitala

== Demographics ==
As of 2011 India census, Kulbatpur had a population of 4,038. Males constituted 51.4% of the population and females 48.6%.
