= Iqbal Ahmed (disambiguation) =

Iqbal Ahmed (born 1956) is a Bangladesh-born British entrepreneur.

Iqbal Ahmed may also refer to:

- Iqbal Ahmad (1922 - 1999), known by the pen name Hasrat Jaipuri, Indian poet
- Iqbal Ahmed Saradgi (born 1944), Indian politician
- Iqbal Z. Ahmed (born 1946), Pakistani businessman
- Iqbal Ahmed Ansari (born 1954), Indian judge
- Iqbal Ahmad Khan (1954–2020), Indian classical vocalist
- Iqbal Ahmed (politician), Indian politician

== See also ==
- Eqbal Ahmad (1933–1999), Pakistani political scientist
