= Parul, Hooghly =

Parul
- Village
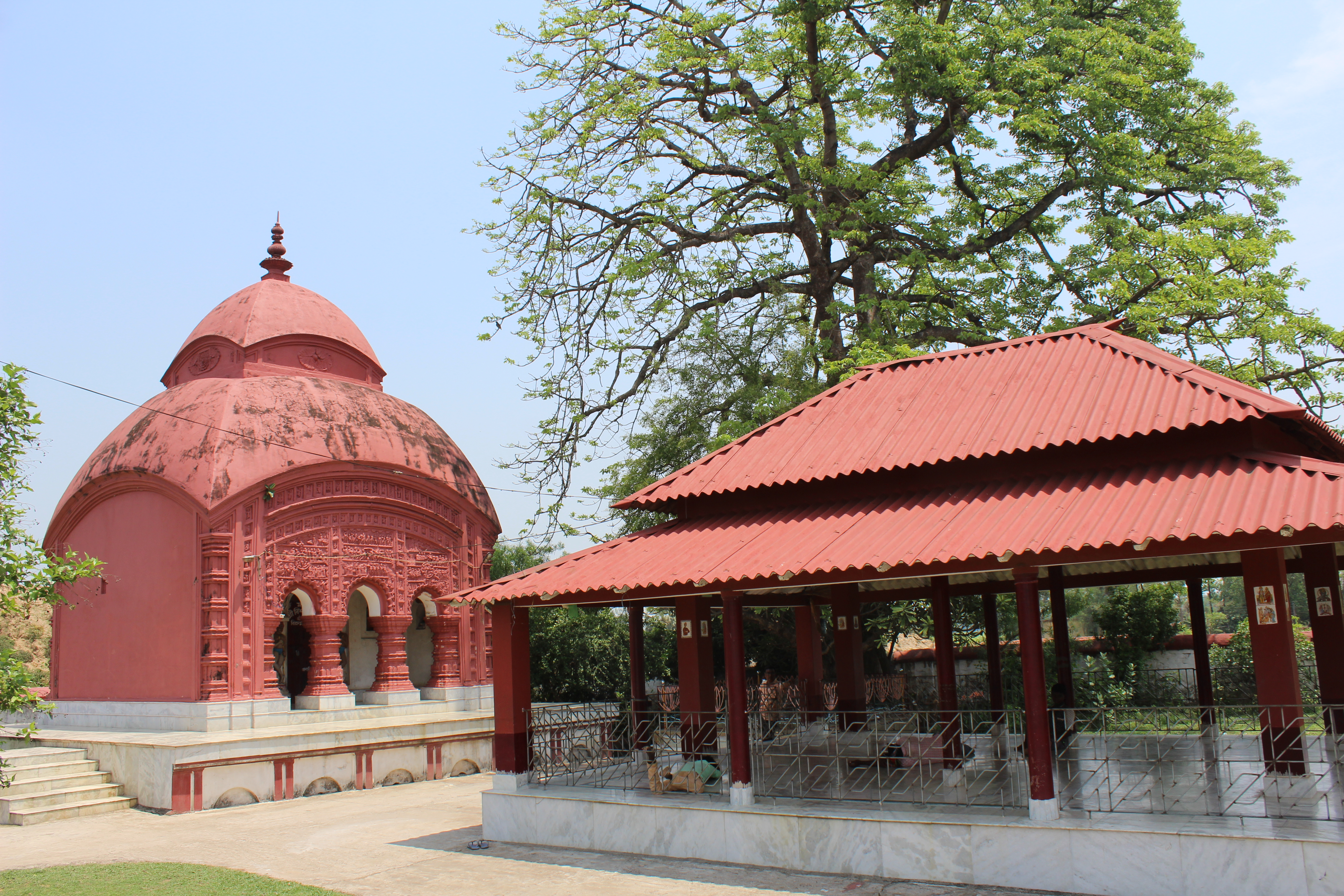
- Bishalakhi temple in Parul

- Location in West Bengal, India Parul (India)
- Coordinates: 22.817578°N 87.936978°E
- Country: India
- State: West Bengal
- District: Hooghly

Population (2011)
  - Total: 1,368

Languages
  - Official: Bengali, English
- Time zone: UTC+5:30 (IST)
- PIN: 712401
- Telephone/STD code: 03212
- Lok Sabha constituency: Arambagh
- Vidhan Sabha constituency: Pursurah
- Website: hooghly.gov.in

Parul is a village in the Pursurah CD block in the Arambagh subdivision of Hooghly district in the Indian state of West Bengal.

== Geography ==
Cities and towns in Arambagh subdivision in Hooghly district
M: municipal city/ town, R: rural/ urban centre, H: historical/ religious centre
Owing to space constraints in the small map, the actual locations in a larger map may vary slightly

=== Location ===
Parul is located at 22.817578°N 87.96978°E.

=== Area overview ===
The Arambagh subdivision, presented in the map alongside, is divided into two physiographic parts – the Dwarakeswar River being the dividing line. The western part is upland and rocky – it is extension of the terrain of neighbouring Bankura district. The eastern part is flat alluvial plain area. The railways, the roads and flood-control measures have had an impact on the area. The area is overwhelmingly rural with 94.77% of the population living in rural areas and 5.23% in urban areas.

Note: The map alongside presents some of the notable locations in the subdivision. All places marked in the map are linked in the larger full screen map.

== Demographics ==
As per the 2011 Census of India, Parul had a total population of 1,368 of which 699 (51%) were males and 669 (49%) were females. Population in the age range 0–6 years was 141. The total number of literate persons in Parul was 1,038 (64.60% of the population over 6 years).

== Culture ==
David J. McCutchion mentions:

- Raghunatha temple of the Chakrabarti family as a standard Hooghly-Bardhaman at chala, measuring 22’ 11" x 20’8", possibly built in 1768. It has panoramic battle scenes above the archways and smaller figures round the façade.
- Visalakshi temple as a Midnapore type at chala, measuring 19’6" square, built in 1859. The archways and other panels round the façade are filled with figures.

The Jor Bangla temple (at Sr No S-WB-56) and the Raghunandan temple (at Sr No S-WB-57) at Parul are included in the List of State Protected Monuments in West Bengal by the Archaeological Survey of India.

== Parul picture gallery ==
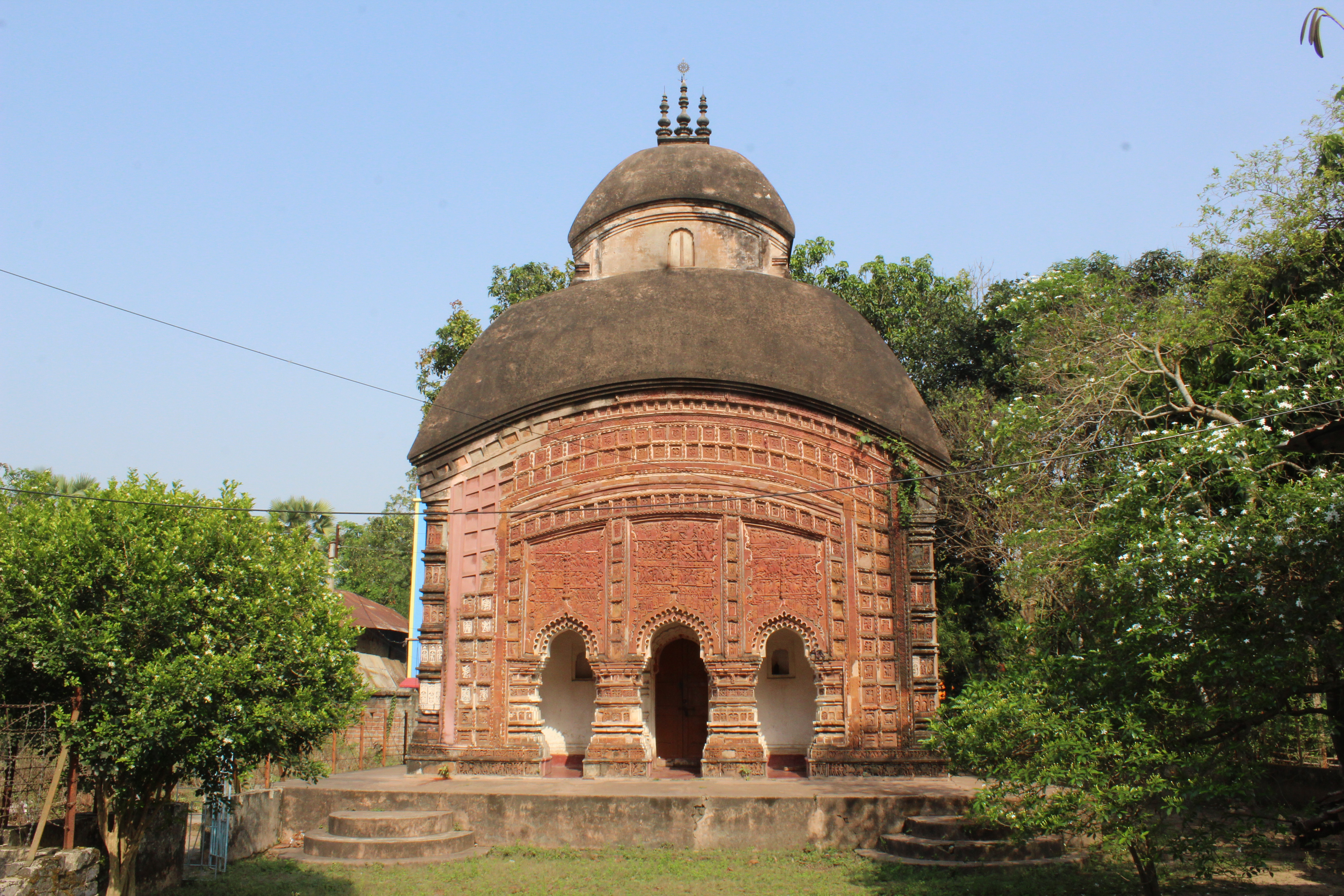
Raghunandan temple of Chakrabarti family, at chala, built in 1768.

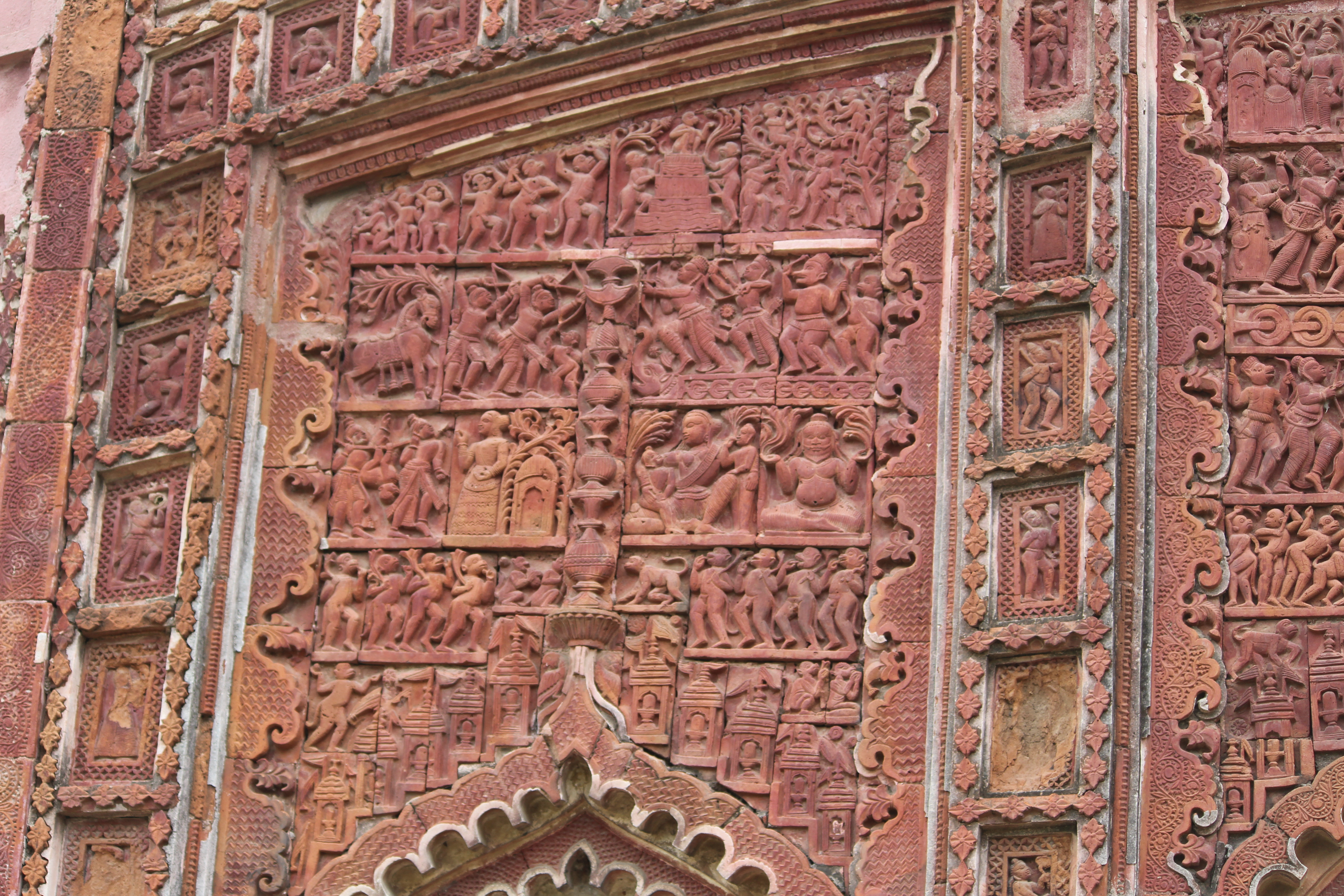
Terracotta panel in Raghunandan temple.

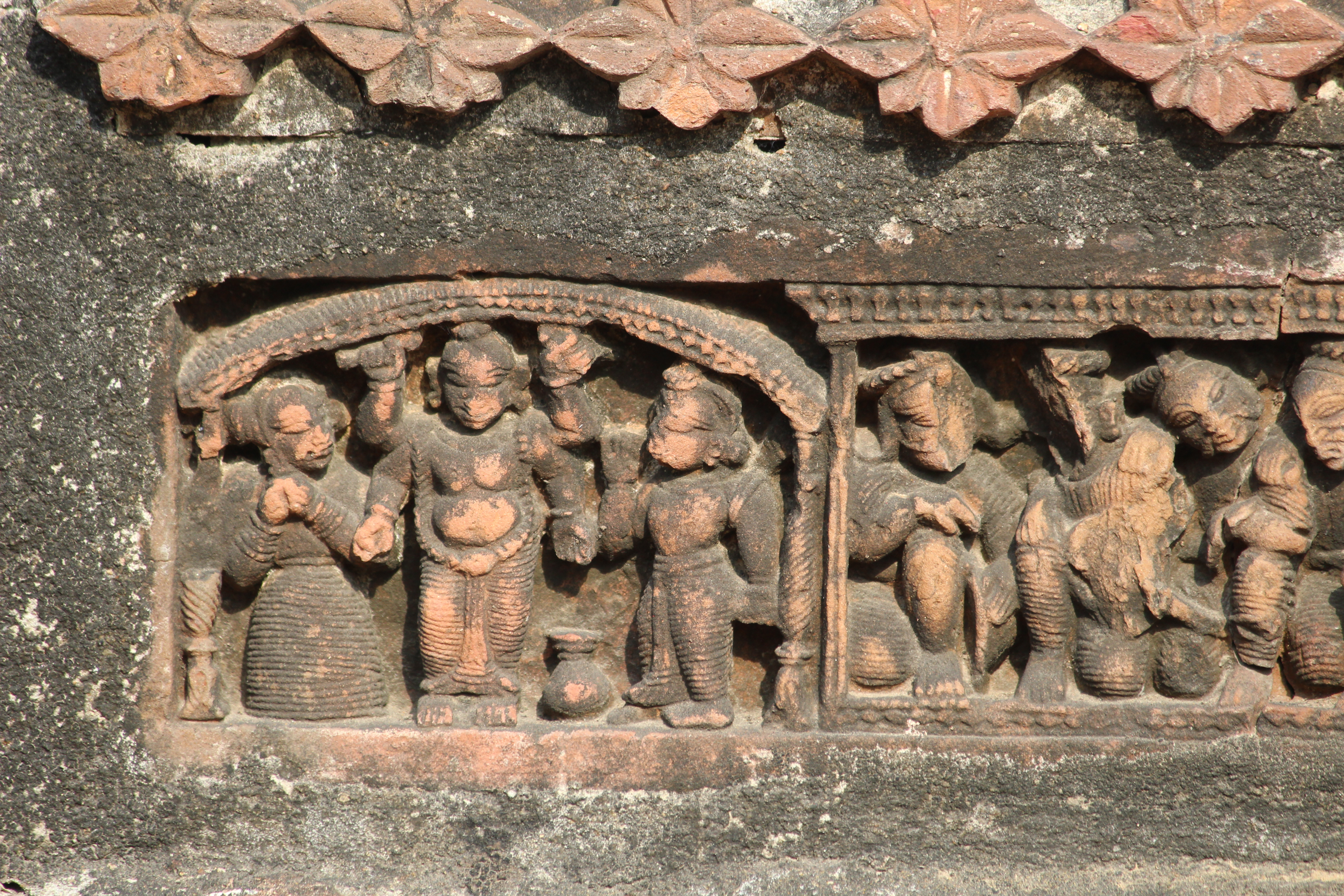
Terracotta decoration in Raghunandan temple.

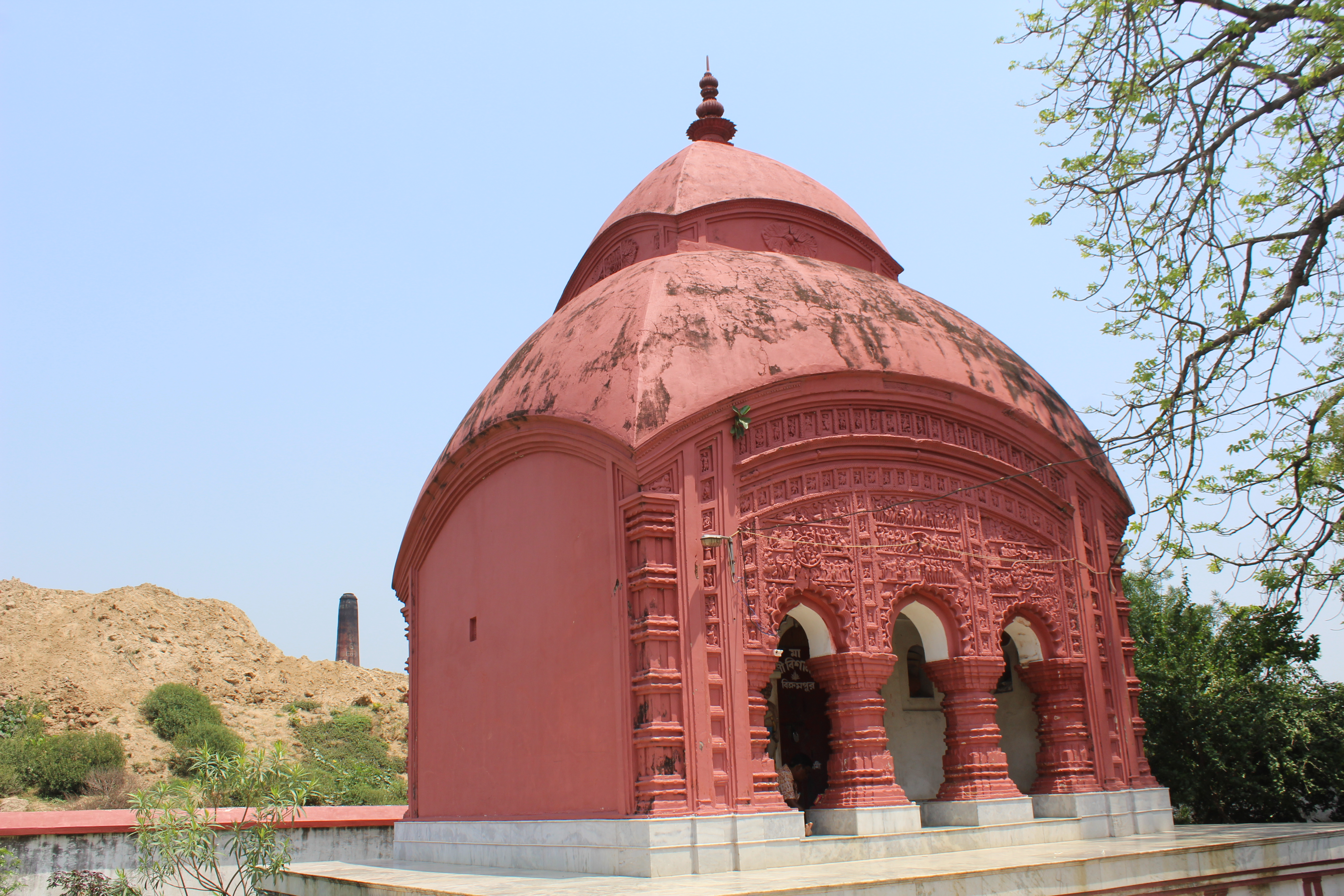
Bisalakshi temple, at-chala, built in 1859.

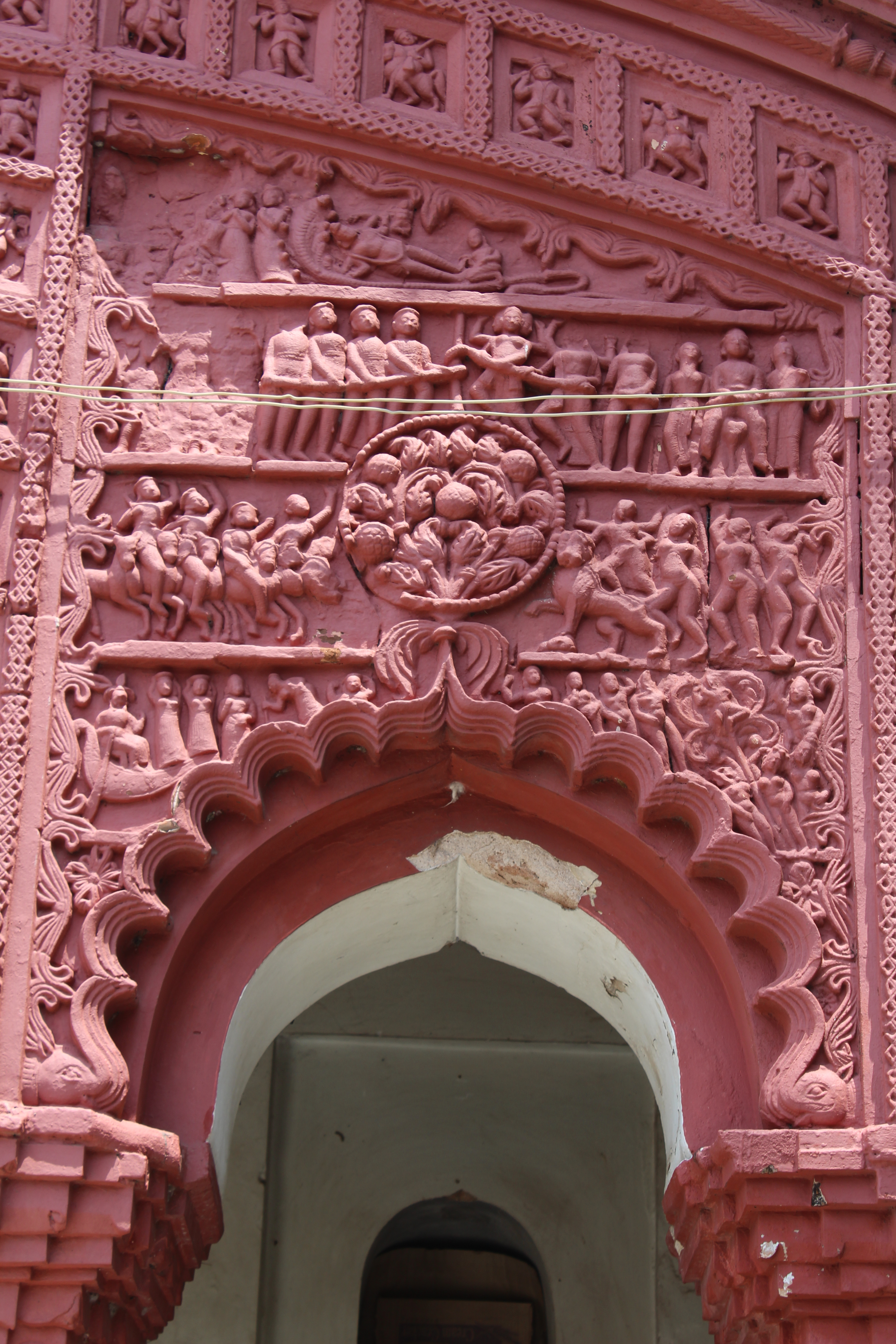
Terracotta Panel in Bisalakshi temple.

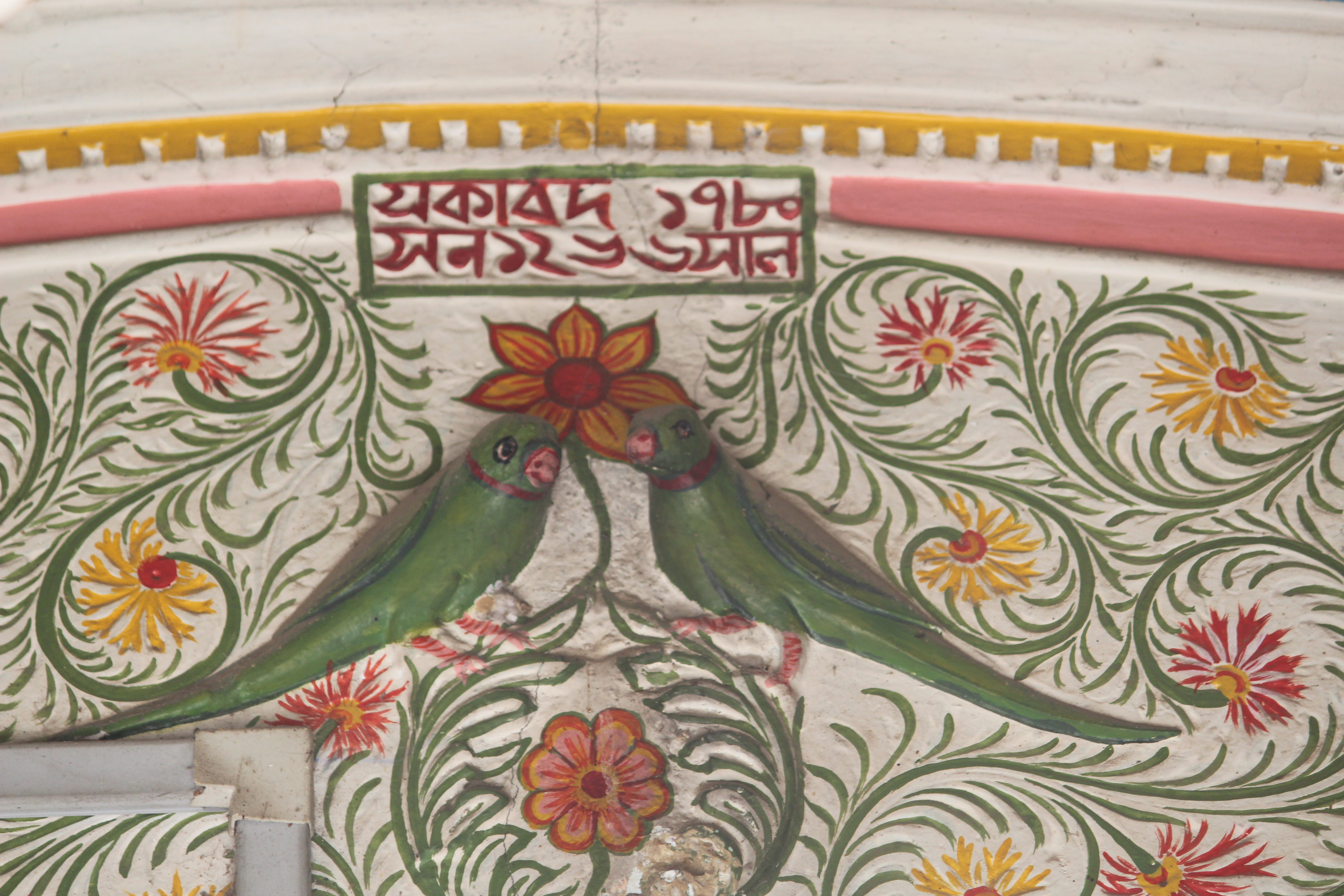
Decoration in Bisalakshi temple.

Click on the pictures to enlarge picture size
