= Ghol Digrui =

Village in the West Bengal, India

- Location within West Bengal Location within India
- Country: India
- State: West Bengal
- District: Hooghly

Population (2011)
  - Total: 6,699

Languages
  - Official: Bengali, English
- Time zone: UTC+5:30 (IST)
- PIN: 712401
- ISO 3166 code: IN-WB
- Vehicle registration: WB
- Lok Sabha constituency: Arambagh
- Vidhan Sabha constituency: Pursurah
- Website: wb.gov.in

Ghol Digrui is a village under Pursurah CD block, Hooghly district, in the Indian state of West Bengal. Pin code of Gholdigrui is 712401.
