= Pursurah (community development block) =

- Community development block
- Interactive map of Pursurah
- Coordinates: 22.850278°N 87.962778°E
- Country: India
- State: West Bengal
- District: Hooghly

Government
  - Type: Representative democracy

Area
  - Total: 100.42 km^{2} (38.77 sq mi)
- Elevation: 13 m (43 ft)

Population (2011)
  - Total: 173,437
  - Density: 1,727.1/km^{2} (4,473.2/sq mi)

Languages
  - Official: Bengali, English
- Time zone: UTC+5:30 (IST)
- PIN: 712401 (Pursurah)
- Area code: 03212
- ISO 3166 code: IN-WB
- Vehicle registration: WB-15, WB-16, WB-18
- Literacy: 82.12%
- Lok Sabha constituency: Arambagh
- Vidhan Sabha constituency: Pursurah
- Website: hooghly.gov.in

Pursurah (also spelled Pursura) is a community development block that forms an administrative division in Arambag subdivision of Hooghly district in the Indian state of West Bengal.

== Overview ==
The Pursurah CD Block is part of the Dwarakeswar-Damodar inter-riverine plain with alluvial soil.

== Geography ==
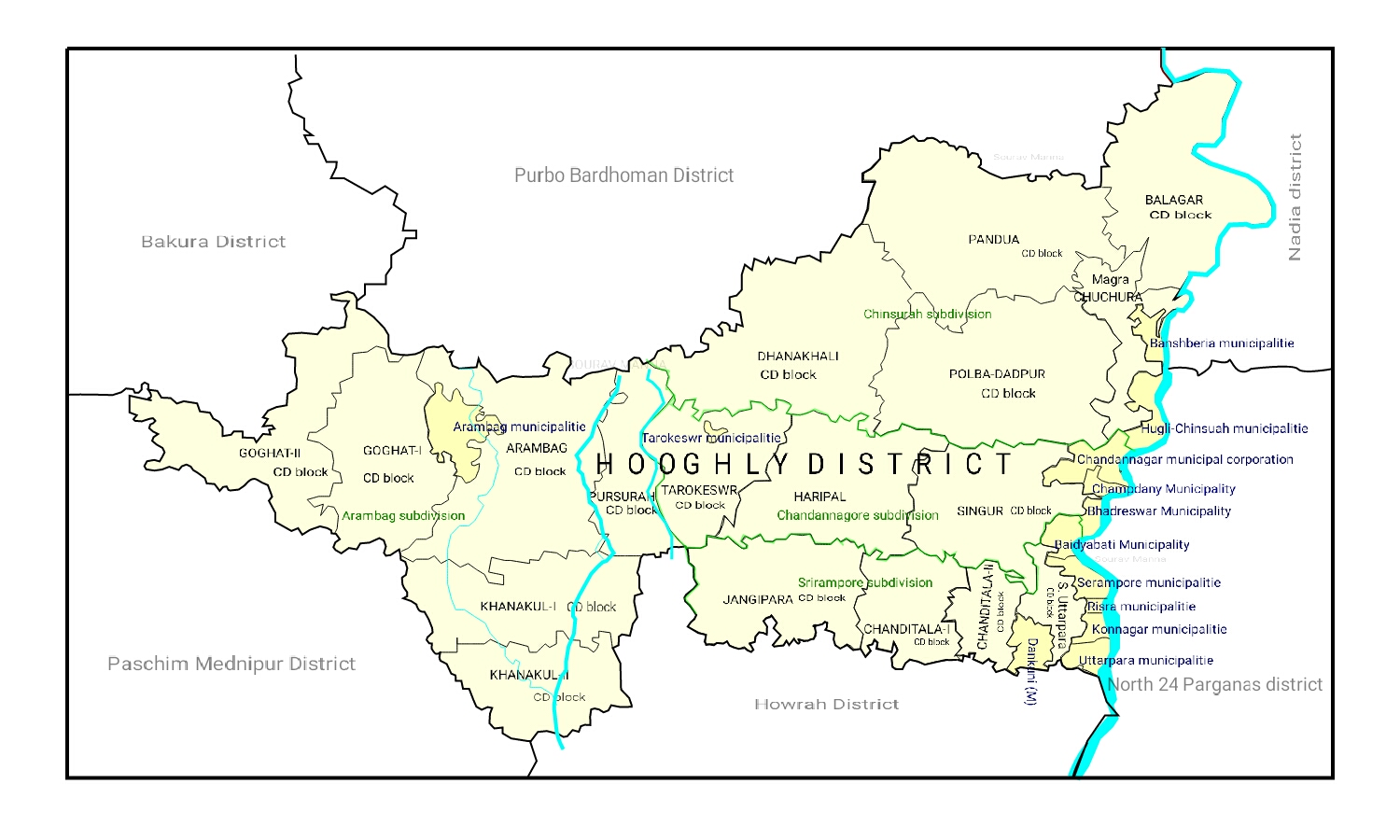
Map of Hooghly district showing CD blocks and municipal areas

Map of Pursurah CD Block sowing GP areas

Pursurah is located at 22°51′01″N 87°57′46″E. It is about 7 kilometers away from Tarakeswar.

Pursurah CD Block is bounded by Raina II CD Block, in Bardhaman district, in the north, Dhaniakhali, Tarakeshwar and Jangipara CD Blocks in the east, and Udaynarayanpur CD Block, in Howrah district, and Khanakul I and Khanakul II CD Blocks in the south and Arambagh CD Block in the west.

It is located 72 km from Chinsurah, the district headquarters.

Pursurah CD Block has an area of 100.42 km^{2}. It has 1 panchayat samity, 8 gram panchayats, 138 gram sansads (village councils), 50 mouzas and 50 inhabited villages. Pursurah police station serves this block. Headquarters of this CD Block is at Pursurah.

Gram panchayats of Pursurah block/ panchayat samiti are: Bhangamorah, Chilladangi, Dehibatpur, Kelepara, Pursurah I, Pursurah II, Shyampur and Shrirampur.

== Demographics ==
=== Population ===
As per the 2011 Census of India Pursura CD Block had a total population of 173,437, all of which were rural. There were 88,908 (51%) males and 84,529 (49%) females. Population below 6 years was 17,804. Scheduled Castes numbered 37,025 (21.35%) and Scheduled Tribes numbered 839 (0.48%).

At the 2001 census, Pursurah block had a total population of 156,212, out of which 79,943 were males and 76,269 were females. Pursurah block registered a population growth of 10.08 per cent during the 1991-2001 decade. Decadal growth for Hooghly district was 15.72 per cent. Decadal growth in West Bengal was 17.84 per cent.

Large villages (with 4,000+ population) in Pursurah CD Block are (2011 census figures in brackets) : Soaluk (9,196), Baikunthapur (8,794), Kulbatpur (4,039), Paschimpara (4,829), Nimdangi (4,739), Jangalpara (9,239), Pursurah (7,225), Shrirampur (7,490), Rautara (4,626), Saidpur (4,629), Akri Fatepur (4,776), Chilladangi (7,492), Bara Digrui (4,739), Ghol Digrui (6,699) and Shyampur (6,719).

Other villages in Pursurah CD Block include (2011 census figures in brackets): Bhangamora (3,061), Kelepara (3,949), Dihibatpur (3,054) and Parul (1,368).

=== Literacy ===
As per the 2011 census the total number of literates in Pursura CD Block was 127,809 (82.12% of the population over 6 years) out of which males numbered 70,698 (88.63% of the male population over 6 years) and females numbered 57,111 (75.28% of the female population over 6 years). The gender disparity (the difference between female and male literacy rates) was 13.35%.

At the 2001 census, Pursurah block had a total literacy of 54.93 per cent. While male literacy was 64.93 per cent, female literacy was 43.34 per cent.

See also – List of West Bengal districts ranked by literacy rate

Literacy in CD blocks of
Hooghly district
Arambagh subdivision
Arambagh – 79.10
Khanakul I – 77.73
Khanakul II – 79.16
Goghat I – 78.70
Goghat II – 77.24
Pursurah – 82.12
Chandannagar subdivision
Haripal – 78.59
Singur – 84.01
Tarakeswar – 79.96
Chinsurah subdivision
Balagarh – 76.94
Chinsurah Mogra – 83.01
Dhaniakhali – 75.66
Pandua – 75.86
Polba Dadpur – 75.14
Srirampore subdivision
Chanditala I – 83.76
Chanditala II – 84.78
Jangipara – 75.34
Sreerampur Uttarpara – 87.33
Source: 2011 Census: CD Block Wise
Primary Census Abstract Data

=== Language and religion ===
Religion in Pursurah CD block (2011)
Hinduism	83.51%
Islam	16.28%
Other or not stated	0.21%

As per the 2011 census, majority of the population of the district belong to the Hindu community with a population share of 82.9% followed by Muslims at 15.8%. The percentage of the Hindu population of the district has followed a decreasing trend from 87.1% in 1961 to 82.9% in the latest census 2011. On the other hand, the percentage of Muslim population has increased from 12.7% in 1961 to 15.8% in 2011 census.

In the 2011 census Hindus numbered 144,830 and formed 83.51% of the population in Pursurah CD Block. Muslims numbered 28,242 and formed 16.28% of the population. Others numbered 365 and formed 0.21% of the population.

Bengali is the predominant language, spoken by 99.82% of the population.

== Rural poverty ==
As per poverty estimates obtained from household survey for families living below poverty line in 2005, rural poverty in Pursurah CD Block was 31.51%.

== Economy ==
=== Livelihood ===
Livelihood
in Pursurah CD Block
1. Cultivators (26.5%)
2. Agricultural labourers (33.8%)
3. Household industries (3.78%)
4. Other Workers (35.9%)

In Pursurah CD Block in 2011, amongst the class of total workers, cultivators formed 26.52%, agricultural labourers 33.83%, household industry workers 3.78% and other workers 35.88%.

=== Infrastructure ===
There are 50 inhabited villages in Pursurah CD Block. 100% villages have power supply. 36 villages have more than one source of drinking water (tap, well, tube well, hand pump), 1 village has only tube well/ borewell and 12 villages have only hand pump. 5 villages have post offices and 14 villages have sub post offices. All 50 villages have telephone landlines, 30 villages have public call offices and 47 villages have mobile phone coverage. 21 villages have pucca roads and 28 villages have bus service (public/ private). 17 villages have agricultural credit societies and 12 villages have commercial/ co-operative banks.

Important Handicrafts of Hooghly District
- Zari Work on Sari - Pandua, Pursurah, Jangipara, Tarakeswar and other blocks - 3,000 families involved
- Chikon Embroidery – Babnan, Pandua, Singur - 2,500 families involved
- Silk and Cotton Printing – Serampore (Chanditala) - 300 families involved
- Brass and Bell Metal – Manikpat, Goghat, Arambagh - 150 families involved
- Conch Shell – Pandua, Khanakul, Makla, Chandannagar
- Jute Diversified Product – Baidyabati, Mogra
- Terracota – Chinsurah, Chandannagar, Baidyabati, Mogra

Source:District Human Development Report 2010: Hooghly P. 67

=== Agriculture ===
This is a rich agricultural area with several cold storages. Though rice is the prime crop of the district, the agricultural economy largely depends on potato, jute, vegetables, and orchard products. Though potato is cultivated in all the blocks of this district Dhaniakhali, Arambagh, Goghat, Pursurah, Haripal, Polba-Dadpur, Tarakeswar, Pandua and Singur contributed much of its production of this district.

Some of the primary and other hats or markets in the Pursurah CD Block are: Chiladingi bazaar, Dihibatpur hat and Khusiganj hat.

The Tebhaga movement launched in 1946, in 24 Parganas district, aimed at securing for the share-croppers a better position within the existing land relation structure. Although the subsequent Bargadari Act of 1950 recognised the rights of bargadars to a higher share of crops from the land that they tilled, it was not implemented fully. Large tracts, beyond the prescribed limit of land ceiling, remained with the rich landlords. From 1977 onwards major land reforms took place in West Bengal. Land in excess of land ceiling was acquired and distributed amongst the peasants. Following land reforms land ownership pattern has undergone transformation. In 2013–14, persons engaged in agriculture in Pursurah CD Block could be classified as follows: bargadars 8.72%, patta (document) holders 2.79%, small farmers (possessing land between 1 and 2 hectares) 5.71%, marginal farmers (possessing land up to 1 hectare) 38.12% and agricultural labourers 44.66%.

Pursurah CD Block had 120 fertiliser depots, 17 seed stores and 38 fair price shops in 2013-14.

In 2013–14, Pursurah CD Block produced 1,663 tonnes of Aman paddy, the main winter crop from 690 hectares, 288 tonnes of Boro paddy (spring crop) from 112 hectares, 25 tonnes of wheat from 10 hectares, 54,049 tonnes of jute from 2,601 hectares, 126,139 tonnes of potatoes from 8,017 hectares and 129,934 tonnes of sugar cane from 814 hectares. It also produced some pulses and oilseeds.

In 2013–14, the total area irrigated in Pursurah CD Block was 7,880 hectares, out of which 1,860 hectares were irrigated by tank water, 1,560 hectares by river lift irrigation, 1,110 hectares by deep tube wells and 3,350 hectares by shallow tube wells.

=== Banking ===
In 2013–14, Pursurah CD Block had offices of 9 commercial banks and 2 gramin banks.

== Transport ==
Pursurah CD Block has 6 ferry services and 4 originating/ terminating bus routes.

EMU services, earlier operating from Howrah to Tarakeswar, was extended to Arambagh P.C.Sen railway station on 16 September 2012, after completion of the electrified broad gauge Tarakewar-Arambagh sector of the Tarakeswar-Bishnupur extension of the Sheoraphuli–Bishnupur branch line. As of 2017, trains are operating up to Goghat and there are halt stations at Talpur and Takipur.

It is part of Kolkata Suburban Railway network.

State Highway 7 (West Bengal) running from Rajgram (in Birbhum district) to Midnapore passes through this CD Block.

== Education ==
In 2013–14, Pursurah CD Block had 107 primary schools with 10,227 students, 4 middle schools with 333 students, 8 high schools with 4,035 students and 10 higher secondary schools with 14,080 students. Pursurah CD Block had 1 general colleges with 58 students, 1 technical/ professional institution with 100 students and 238 institutions for special and non-formal education with 6,982 students

In Pursurah CD Block, amongst the 50 inhabited villages, all villages had a school, 17 villages had more than 1 primary school, 21 villages had at least 1 primary and 1 middle school and 14 villages had at least 1 middle and 1 secondary school.

== Culture ==
The Pursurah CD block has one prominent location with two heritage temples.

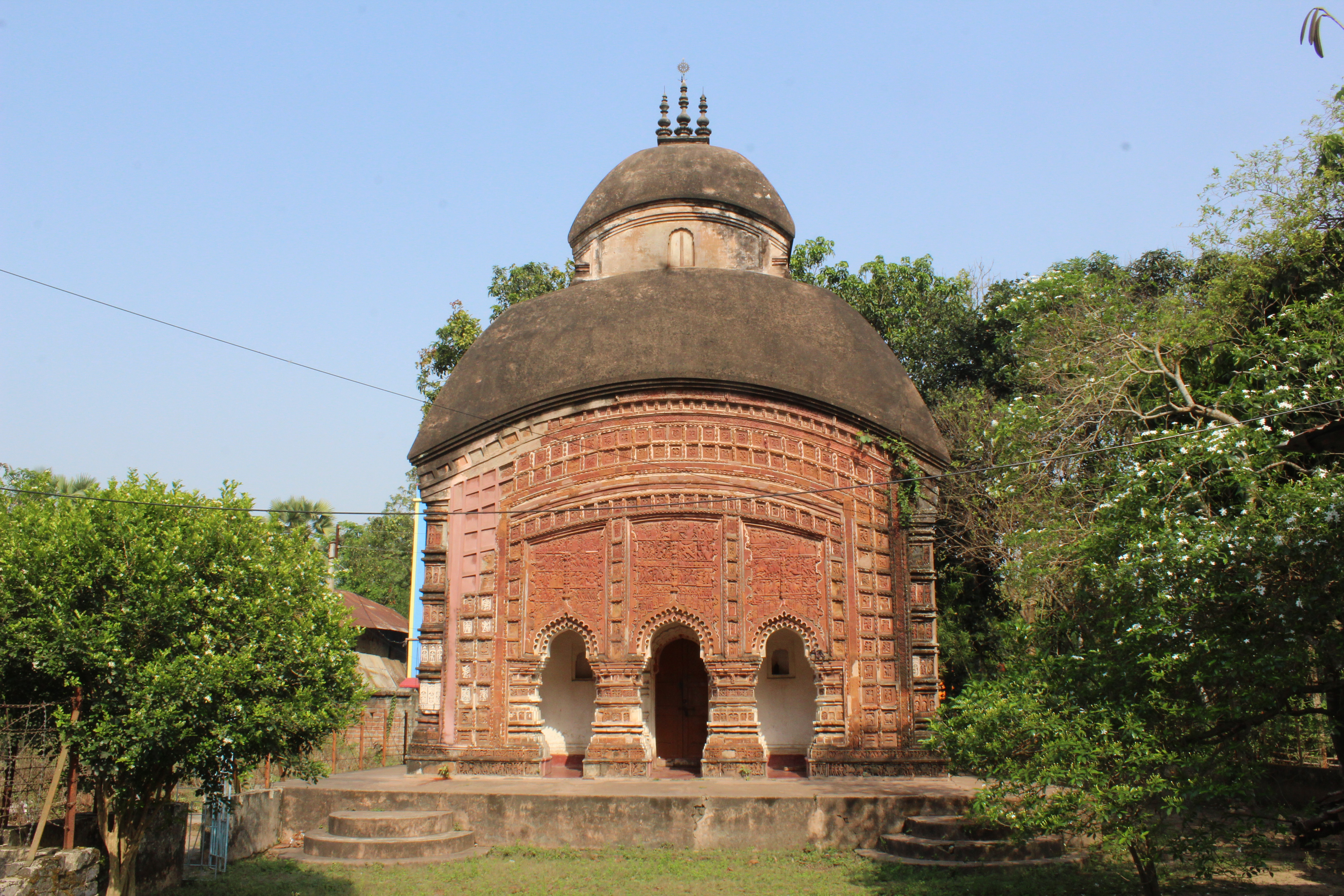

Parul: Raghunandan temple (in picture), at chala, built in 1768, with extensive terracota design work, and Bisalakshi temple, built in 1859, with terracotta panels and artistic decoration.

== Healthcare ==
In 2014, Pursurah CD Block had 1 block primary health centre, 2 primary health centre and 3 private nursing homes with total 62 beds and 4 doctors (excluding private bodies). It had 25 family welfare subcentres. 9,363 patients were treated indoor and 168,007 patients were treated outdoor in the hospitals, health centres and subcentres of the CD Block.

Pursurah CD Block has Akri Shrirampur Rural Hospital (with 30 beds) at Akri Shrirampur, Fatepuhas Primary Health Centre at PO Parshyampur (with 4 beds) and Dihibatpur PHC at PO Alati (with 10 beds).

Pursurah CD Block is one of the areas of Hooghly district where ground water is affected by low level of arsenic contamination. The WHO guideline for arsenic in drinking water is 10 mg/ litre, and the Indian Standard value is 50 mg/ litre. In Hooghly district, 16 blocks have arsenic levels above WHO guidelines and 11 blocks above Indian standard value. The maximum concentration in Pursurah CD Block is 38 mg/litre.
