= Susanta Ghosh (Khanakul politician) =

Indian politician

Member of the West Bengal Legislative Assembly
- In office 2 May 2021 – Incumbent
- Preceded by: Iqbal Ahmed
- Constituency: Khanakul

Personal details
- Born: January 1, 1989 (age 37)
- Party: Bharatiya Janata Party
- Education: 10th Pass
- Profession: Business

Susanta Ghosh (born 1 January 1989) is an Indian politician from Bharatiya Janata Party. In May 2021, he was elected as a member of the West Bengal Legislative Assembly from Khanakul (constituency). He defeated Munsi Nazbul Karim of All India Trinamool Congress by 12,884 votes in 2021 West Bengal Assembly election.
