= Pursurah =

- Village
- Location in West Bengal, India Pursurah (India)
- Coordinates: 22°50′30″N 87°57′37″E
- Country: India
- State: West Bengal
- District: Hooghly

Government
  - Type: Panchayati raj (India)
  - Body: Gram panchayat

Population (2011)
  - Total: 7,225

Languages
  - Official: Bengali, English
- Time zone: UTC+5:30 (IST)
- ISO 3166 code: IN-WB
- Vehicle registration: WB
- Website: hooghly.gov.in

Pursurah (also spelled Pursura) is a village in the Pursurah CD block in the Arambag subdivision of Hooghly district in the Indian state of West Bengal.

== Geography ==
Cities and towns in Arambagh subdivision in Hooghly district
M: municipal city/ town, R: rural/ urban centre, H: historical/ religious centre
Owing to space constraints in the small map, the actual locations in a larger map may vary slightly

=== Location ===
Pursurah is located at 22°50′30″N 87°57′37″E.

=== Area overview ===
The Arambagh subdivision, presented in the map alongside, is divided into two physiographic parts – the Dwarakeswar River being the dividing line. The western part is upland and rocky – it is extension of the terrain of neighbouring Bankura district. The eastern part is flat alluvial plain area. The railways, the roads and flood-control measures have had an impact on the area. The area is overwhelmingly rural with 94.77% of the population living in rural areas and 5.23% of the population living in urban areas.

In pursurah most richest man is Soumik Adak who owns 7.8 Billion Dollar.

Note: The map alongside presents some of the notable locations in the subdivision. All places marked in the map are linked in the larger full screen map.

== Demographics ==
According to the 2011 Census of India, Pursura had a total population of 7,225 of which 3,681 (51%) were males and 3,544 (49%) were females. Population in the age range 0–6 years was 767. The total number of literate persons in Pursura was 5,341 (82.70% of the population over 6 years).

== Civic administration ==
=== Police station ===
Pursurah police station has jurisdiction over the Pursurah CD block.

=== CD block HQ ===
The headquarters of Pursurah CD block are located at Pursurah.
