= Khanakul I =

- Community development block
- Interactive map of Khanakul I
- Coordinates: 22.6921903°N 87.8564644°E
- Country: India
- State: West Bengal
- District: Hooghly

Government
  - Type: Representative democracy

Area
  - Total: 171.92 km^{2} (66.38 sq mi)
- Elevation: 15 m (49 ft)

Population (2011)
  - Total: 254,434
  - Density: 1,480.0/km^{2} (3,833.1/sq mi)

Languages
  - Official: Bengali, English
- Time zone: UTC+5:30 (IST)
- PIN: 712406 (Khanakul); 712412 (Helan)
- STD: 03225
- Vehicle registration: WB-15, WB-16, WB-18
- Literacy: 77.73%
- Lok Sabha constituency: Arambagh
- Vidhan Sabha constituency: Khanakul, Pursurah
- Website: hooghly.gov.in

Khanakul I is a community development block that forms an administrative division in Arambag subdivision of Hooghly district in the Indian state of West Bengal.

== Overview ==
The Khanakul I CD Block is part of the Dwarakeswar-Damodar inter-riverine plain with alluvial soil. The Mundeswari flows through the region, carrying water from the Damodar and joins the Rupnarayan at the tri-junction of the Hooghly, Howrah and Purba Medinipur districts. It is a flood prone area.

== Geography ==
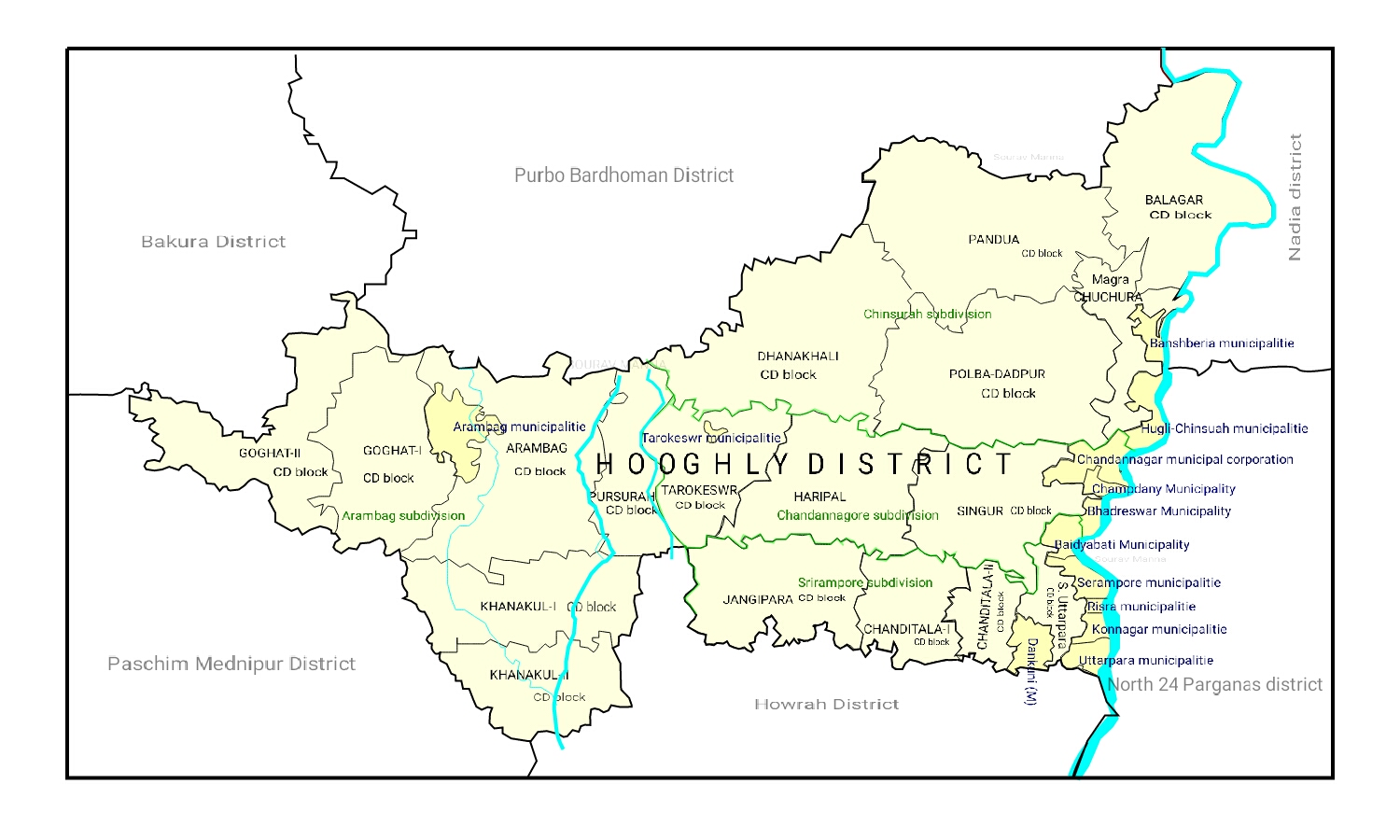
Map of Hooghly district showing CD blocks and municipal areas

Khanakul I is located at 22°41′32″N 87°51′23″E.

Khanakul-I CD block map sowing GP areas

Khanakul I CD Block is bounded by Arambagh and Pursurah CD Blocks in the north, Udaynarayanpur CD Block, in Howrah district, in the east, Khanakul II CD Block in the south, Ghatal CD Block, in Paschim Medinipur district, in the west.

It is located 66 km from Chinsurah, the district headquarters.

Khanakul I CD Block has an area of 171.92 km^{2}. It has 1 panchayat samity, 13 gram panchayats, 192 gram sansads (village councils), 94 mouzas and 93 inhabited villages. Khanakul police station serves this block. Headquarters of this CD Block is at Khanakul.

Raja Rammohan Roy, the great reformer, was born at Radhanagore on 14 August 1774.

Gram panchayats of Khanakul I block/ panchayat samiti are: Arunda, Balipur, Khanakul I, Khanakul II, Kishorpur I, Kishorpur II, Pole I, Pole II, Rammohan I, Rammohan II, Tantisal, Thakuranichak, and Ghoshpur.

== Demographics ==
=== Population ===
As per the 2011 Census of India, Khanakul I CD Block had a total population of 254,434, all of which were rural. There were 130,712 (51%) males and 123,722 (49%) females. Population below 6 years was 29,925. Scheduled Castes numbered 73,310 (28.81%) and Scheduled Tribes numbered 764 (0.30%).

As per the 2001 census, Khanakul I block had a total population of 221,832, out of which 112,183 were males and 109,649 were females. Khanakul I block registered a population growth of 13.00 per cent during the 1991-2001 decade. Decadal growth for Hooghly district was 15.72 per cent. Decadal growth in West Bengal was 17.84 per cent.

Large villages (with 4,000+ population) in Khanakul I CD Block are (2011 census figures in brackets): Mahisgot (4,414), Pilkhana (4,176), Ghoshpur (19,014), Paschim Thakurani Chak (5,514), Purbba Thakurani Chak (7,076), Kanchra (4,068), Mainan (5,623), Pol (11,038), Patul (5,474), Radhaballabhpur (5,168), Krishnanagar (4,767), Dainan Anantanagar (4,840), Tantisal (4,759), Balipur (8,254), Purbba Radhanagar (Radhanagore) (5,582) and Arunda (5,291).

Other villages in Khanakul I CD Block include (2011 census figures in brackets): Khanakul (3,489), Paschim Radhanagar (2,417) and Langulpara (1,989).

=== Literacy ===
As per the 2011 census the total number of literates in Khanakul I CD Block was 174,505 (77.73% of the population over 6 years) out of which males numbered 97,387 (84.41% of the male population over 6 years) and females numbered 77,118 (70.66% of the female population over 6 years). The gender disparity (the difference between female and male literacy rates) was 13.76%.

As per the 2001 census, Khanakul I block had a total literacy of 51 per cent. While male literacy was 74.52 per cent, female literacy was 40.10 per cent.

See also – List of West Bengal districts ranked by literacy rate

Literacy in CD blocks of
Hooghly district
Arambagh subdivision
Arambagh – 79.10
Khanakul I – 77.73
Khanakul II – 79.16
Goghat I – 78.70
Goghat II – 77.24
Pursurah – 82.12
Chandannagar subdivision
Haripal – 78.59
Singur – 84.01
Tarakeswar – 79.96
Chinsurah subdivision
Balagarh – 76.94
Chinsurah Mogra – 83.01
Dhaniakhali – 75.66
Pandua – 75.86
Polba Dadpur – 75.14
Srirampore subdivision
Chanditala I – 83.76
Chanditala II – 84.78
Jangipara – 75.34
Sreerampur Uttarpara – 87.33
Source: 2011 Census: CD Block Wise
Primary Census Abstract Data

=== Language and religion ===
Religion in Khanakul I CD block (2011)
Hinduism	75.96%
Islam	23.90%
Other or not stated	0.14%

As per the 2011 census, majority of the population of the district belong to the Hindu community with a population share of 82.9% followed by Muslims at 15.8%. The percentage of the Hindu population of the district has followed a decreasing trend from 87.1% in 1961 to 82.9% in the latest census 2011. On the other hand, the percentage of Muslim population has increased from 12.7% in 1961 to 15.8% in 2011 census.

In 2011 census Hindus numbered 254,434 and formed 75.96% of the population in Khanakul I CD Block. Muslims numbered 60,813 and formed 23.90% of the population. Others numbered 352 and formed 0.14% of the population.

Bengali is the predominant language, spoken by 99.94% of the population.

== Rural poverty ==
As per poverty estimates obtained from household survey for families living below poverty line in 2005, rural poverty in Khanakul I CD Block was 11.10%.

== Economy ==
=== Livelihood ===
Livelihood
in Khanakul I CD Block
1. Cultivators (19.6%)
2. Agricultural labourers (34.8%)
3. Household industries (9.43%)
4. Other Workers (36.1%)

In Khanakul I CD Block in 2011, amongst the class of total workers, cultivators formed 19.61%, agricultural labourers 34.83%, household industry workers 9.43% and other workers 36.14%.

=== Infrastructure ===
There are 93 inhabited villages in Khanakul I CD Block. 100% villages have power supply. 54 villages have more than one source of drinking water (tap, well, tube well, hand pump), 24 villages have only tube well/ borewell and 12 villages have only hand pump. 13 villages have post offices, 11 villages have sub post offices and 1 villages has a post and telegraph office. 63 villages have landlines, 61 villages have public call offices and 74 villages have mobile phone coverage. 16 villages have pucca roads and 31 villages have bus service (public/ private). 24 villages have agricultural credit societies, 18 villages have commercial/ co-operative banks and 1 village has bank ATM.

Important Handicrafts of Hooghly District
- Zari Work on Sari - Pandua, Pursurah, Jangipara, Tarakeswar and other blocks - 3,000 families involved
- Chikon Embroidery – Babnan, Pandua, Singur - 2,500 families involved
- Silk and Cotton Printing – Serampore (Chanditala) - 300 families involved
- Brass and Bell Metal – Manikpat, Goghat, Arambagh - 150 families involved
- Conch Shell – Pandua, Khanakul, Makla, Chandannagar
- Jute Diversified Product – Baidyabati, Mogra
- Terracota – Chinsurah, Chandannagar, Baidyabati, Mogra

Source:District Human Development Report 2010: Hooghly P. 67

=== Agriculture ===
Some of the primary and other hats or markets in the Khanakul I CD Block are: Balpai, Bandipur hat, Dharampur market, Ghoshpara hat, Helan hat, Mayal hat, Polhat and Radhaballavpur hat.

The Tebhaga movement launched in 1946, in 24 Parganas district, aimed at securing for the share-croppers a better position within the existing land relation structure. Although the subsequent Bargadari Act of 1950 recognised the rights of bargadars to a higher share of crops from the land that they tilled, it was not implemented fully. Large tracts, beyond the prescribed limit of land ceiling, remained with the rich landlords. From 1977 onwards major land reforms took place in West Bengal. Land in excess of land ceiling was acquired and distributed amongst the peasants. Following land reforms land ownership pattern has undergone transformation. In 2013–14, persons engaged in agriculture in Khanakul CD Block could be classified as follows: bargadars 16.68%, patta (document) holders 2.75%, small farmers (possessing land between 1 and 2 hectares) 3.06%, marginal farmers (possessing land up to 1 hectare) 36.94% and agricultural labourers 40.57%.

Khanakul I CD Block had 89 fertiliser depots, 33 seed stores and 70 fair price shops in 2013–14.

In 2013–14, Khanakul I CD Block produced 3,263 tonnes of Aman paddy, the main winter crop from 1,513 hectares, 17,805 tonnes of Boro paddy (spring crop) from 6,389 hectares, 6,025 tonnes of Aus paddy (summer crop) from 2,544 hectares, 24 tonnes wheat from 10 hectares, 55,380 tonnes of jute from 2,600 hectares and 187,352 tonnes of potatoes from 11,426 hectares. It also produced oilseeds.

In 2013–14, the total area irrigated in Khanakul I CD Block was 12,283 hectares, out of which 2,500 hectares were irrigated by canal water, 1,500 hectares by tank water, 2,210 hectares by river lift irrigation, 1,290 hectares by deep tube wells and 4,783 hectares by shallow tube wells.

=== Banking ===
In 2013–14, Khanakul I CD Block had offices of 10 commercial banks and 1 gramin bank.

== Transport ==
Khanakul I CD Block has 14 ferry services and 7 originating/ terminating bus routes. The nearest railway station is 20 km from CD Block headquarters.

== Education ==
In 2013–14, Khanakul I CD Block had 175 primary schools with 16,735 students, 17 middle schools with 2,655 students, 13 high schools with 7,988 students and 14 higher secondary schools with 18,570 students. Khanakul I CD Block had 1 general colleges with 2,485 students, 1 technical/ professional institution with 91 students and 358 institutions for special and non-formal education with 11,498 students

Raja Rammohan Roy Mahavidyalaya, a general degree college, was established at Radhanagore in 1964.

In Khanakul I CD Block, amongst the 93 inhabited villages, only 1 village had no school, 65 villages had more than 1 primary school, 47 villages had at least 1 primary school, 45 villages had at least 1 primary and 1 middle school and 28 villages had at least 1 middle and 1 secondary school.

== Healthcare ==
In 2014, Khanakul I CD Block had 1 rural hospital, 3 primary health centre and 4 private nursing homes with total 95 beds and 5 doctors (excluding private bodies). It had 40 family welfare subcentres. 25,279 patients were treated indoor and 251,364 patients were treated outdoor in the hospitals, health centres and subcentres of the CD Block.

Khanakul I CD Block has Khanakul Rural Hospital (with 60 beds) at Khanakul, Ghoshpur Primary Health Centre at PO Pilkhan (with 10 beds), Tantisal PHC (with 10 beds) and Harimohan Golap Sundari PHC at PO Raghunathpur (with 4 beds).

Khanakul I CD Block is one of the areas of Hooghly district where ground water is affected by high level of arsenic contamination. The WHO guideline for arsenic in drinking water is 10 mg/ litre, and the Indian Standard value is 50 mg/ litre. In Hooghly district, 16 blocks have arsenic levels above WHO guidelines and 11 blocks above Indian standard value. The maximum concentration in Khanakul I CD Block is 390 mg/litre.
