= Radhanagore =

Radhanagore Radhanagar
- Village
- Location in West Bengal, India Radhanagore (India)
- Coordinates: 22.726513°N 87.866035°E
- Country: India
- State: West Bengal
- District: Hooghly
- Elevation: 12 m (39 ft)

Languages
  - Official: Bengali, English
- Time zone: UTC+5:30 (IST)
- PIN: 712406
- ISO 3166 code: IN-WB

Radhanagore (also spelled Radhanagar) is a village in Khanakul I CD block of Arambagh subdivision in the Hooghly District of West Bengal, India. It is the birthplace of Ram Mohan Roy. Located near Khanakul, it is approachable from Tarakeswar or Arambag. Mundeswari river flows nearby.

The Raja's ancestral home and ruins of the house he built at the Langulpara cremation ground are still there. A college has been established in his name in Khanakul.

Kamarpukur, also in Hooghly District, birthplace of Sri Ramkrishna and Birsingha was in Hooghly District but currently in Paschim Medinipur, birthplace of Iswar Chandra Vidyasagar are near Radhanagore.

== Geography ==
Cities and towns in Arambagh subdivision in Hooghly district
M: municipal city/ town, R: rural/ urban centre, H: historical/ religious centre
Owing to space constraints in the small map, the actual locations in a larger map may vary slightly

=== Area overview ===
The Arambagh subdivision, presented in the map alongside, is divided into two physiographic parts – the Dwarakeswar River being the dividing line. The western part is upland and rocky – it is extension of the terrain of neighbouring Bankura district. The eastern part is flat alluvial plain area. The railways, the roads and flood-control measures have had an impact on the area. The area is overwhelmingly rural with 94.77% of the population living in rural areas and 5.23% of the population living in urban areas.

Note: The map alongside presents some of the notable locations in the subdivision. All places marked in the map are linked in the larger full screen map.

=== Gram panchayats ===
Khanakul-I Block has two gram panchayats named Rammohan-I and Rammohan-II covering both Radhanagar and Langulpara.

Rammohan-I covers the following villages: Gaurangapur, Jagannathpur, Amarpur, Jakri, Sarda, Kalimba, Raghunathpur, Langulpara, Sahanpur, Chak Sonatikri, Dhamla, Paschim Radhanagar, and Senpur. Rammohan-II covers the following villages: Shrirampur, Kaiba, Atghara, Sekendarpur, Gobindapur, Khamargor, Maikhanda, and Helan.

== Demographics ==
Paschim Radhanagar had a population of 2,220 and Langulpara of 1,638. Purba Radhanagar with a population of 4,878 is part of Balipur panchayat.

== Education ==
Raja Rammohan Roy Mahavidyalaya, a general degree college, was established at Radhanagore in 1964.

Raja Rammohan Roy Government Primary Teachers' Training Institute, a government-run teacher training institute affiliated with the West Bengal Board of Primary Education, was established at Radhanagore in 1968.

Two prominent local residents named Seikh Nurul Huda and Ashraf Mallick played an important role and provided monetary aid in the construction of this college.
