= Tirol, Hoogly =

Tirol
- Village
- Tirol
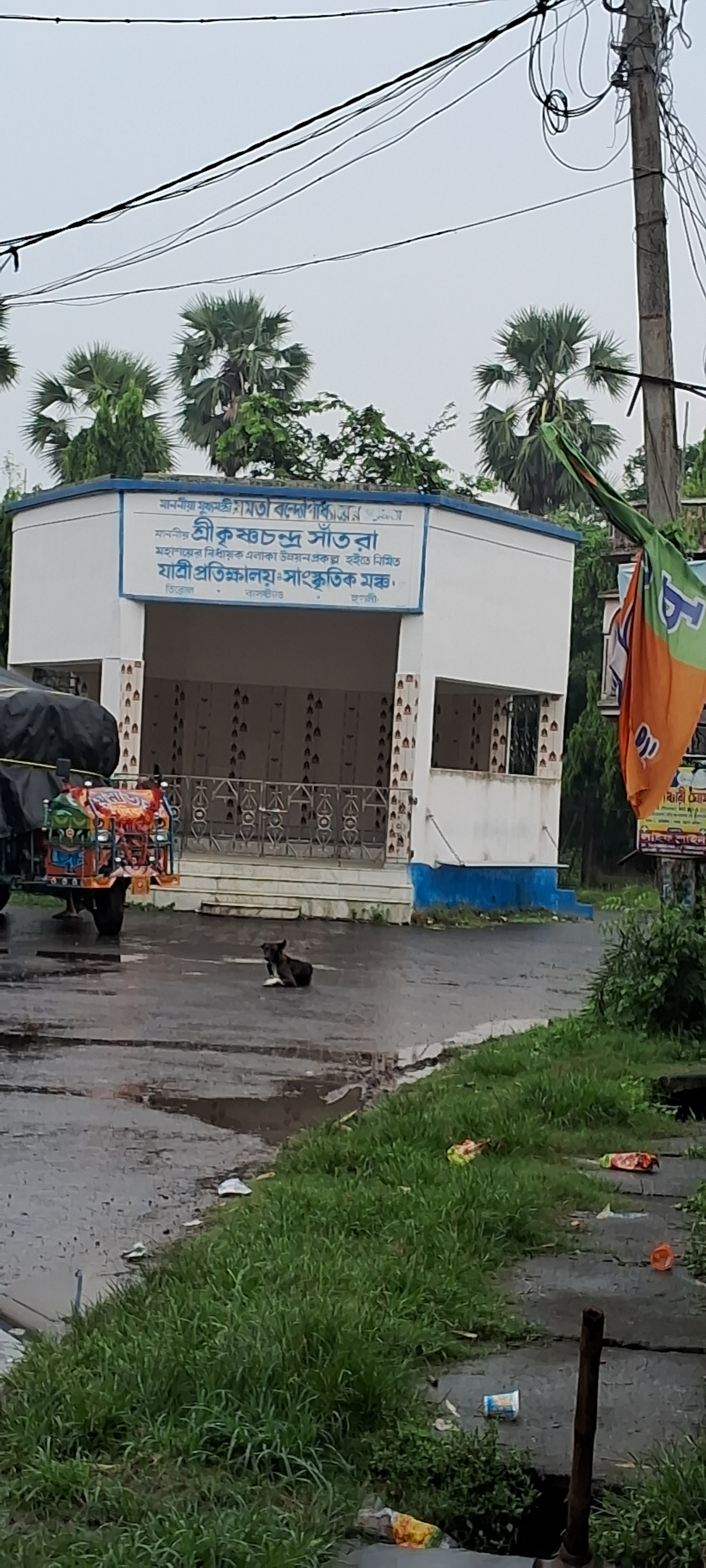
- Interactive map of Tirol
- Country: India
- State: West Bengal
- District: Hoogly

Area
  - Village: 7 km^{2} (2.7 sq mi)
  - Urban: 1 km^{2} (0.39 sq mi)
  - Rural: 6 km^{2} (2.3 sq mi)
- Highest elevation: 10 m (33 ft)
- Lowest elevation: 2 m (6.6 ft)

Population (2011)
  - Village: 4,523
  - Estimate (October 2025): 4,800
- Time zone: UTC+5:30 (IST)
- PIN: 712602
- Telephone: 03451
- Vehicle registration: WB18,WB17

Tirol is a village located in Arambag subdivision of Hoogly in the Indian state of West Bengal.

== Demographics ==
Languages spoken in Tirol
1. Bengali (97.0%)
2. Santali (2.90%)
3. Hindi (0.10%)

Bengali is the most spoken language, followed by Santali and Hindi.

== Transport ==
Public and private bus stands are available. The nearest railway station is Arambagh railway station. Kazi Nazrul Islam Airport in Andal is the nearest.

== Education ==
Tirol High School opened in tirol in the 1960s.

== Fauna ==
Animals such as Indian pariah dog, Indian Buffalo, Indian cow, Bengal fox, Indian palm squirrel, and Gray Langur are found there.

Birds such as Common kingfisher, White-throated kingfisher, Rock dove, House crow, and Indian pond heron are found there.
