= Arambag subdivision =

- Subdivision
- Interactive map of Arambag subdivision
- Coordinates: 22.88°N 87.78°E
- Country: India
- State: West Bengal
- District: Hooghly
- Headquarters: Arambag

Area
  - Total: 1,058.87 km^{2} (408.83 sq mi)

Population (2011)
  - Total: 1,264,602
  - Density: 1,194.29/km^{2} (3,093.21/sq mi)

Languages
  - Official: Bengali, English
- Time zone: UTC+5:30 (IST)
- ISO 3166 code: ISO 3166-2:IN
- Vehicle registration: WB
- Website: wb.gov.in

Arambag subdivision (আরামবাগ মহকুমা) is an administrative subdivision of the Hooghly district in the Indian state of West Bengal.

== Overview ==
Arambag subdivision is a rural dominated area. All the blocks in the subdivision have their entire population living in the rural areas. Arambagh municipality is the only urban area in the entire subdivision. A major portion of the subdivision is part of the Dwarakeswar-Damodar inter-riverine plain with alluvial soil. Only a small portion in the western fringe of the subdivision is upland. The entire area is a part of the Gangetic Delta.

== History ==
Arambagh subdivision was formed in 1819. It was earlier known as Jahanabad. On 19 April 1900 the name of Jahanabad was changed to Arambagh, which means "the garden of ease and comfort". Bankim Chandra Chattopadhyay was in charge of the subdivision in its earlier days. The ruins of a fort at Gar Mandaran provided the setting for Bankim Chandra Chattopadhyay's novel Durgeshnandini, published in 1865.

== Subdivisions ==
The Hooghly district is divided into the following administrative subdivisions:

Subdivision	Headquarters	Area km^{2}	Population (2011)	Rural population % (2011)	Urban population % (2011)
Chinsurah	Hugli-Chuchura	1,148.15	1,657,518	68.63	31.37
Chandannagore	Chandannagar	508.08	1,127,176	58.52	41.48
Srirampore	Serampore	422.45	1,469,849	26.88	73.12
Arambag	Arambag	1,058.87	1,264,602	94.77	5.23
Hooghly district	Chinsurah	3,149.00	5,519,145	61.43	38.57

Cities and towns in Arambagh subdivision in Hooghly district
M: municipal city/ town, R: rural/ urban centre, H: historical/ religious centre
Owing to space constraints in the small map, the actual locations in a larger map may vary slightly

== Administrative units ==
Arambag subdivision has four police stations, six community development blocks, six panchayat samitis, 63 gram panchayats, 567 mouzas, 554 inhabited villages, and one municipality (at Arambag). The subdivision has its headquarters at Arambag.

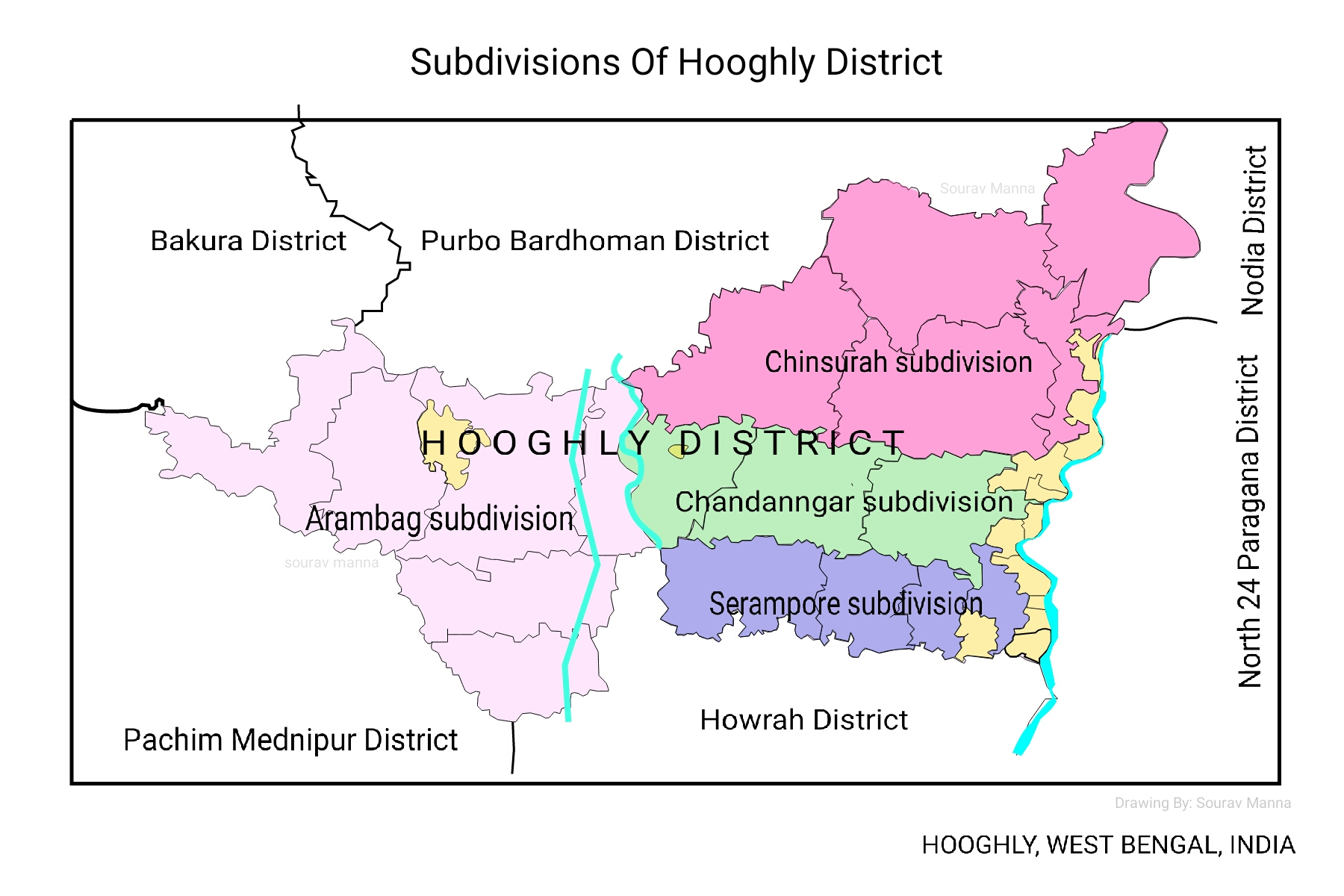

== Gram panchayats ==
The subdivision contains 63 gram panchayats under 6 community development blocks:

- Arambagh block consists of 15 gram panchayats, viz. Arandi–I, Gourhati–II, Malaypur–I, Salepur–I, Arandi–II, Harinkhola–I, Malaypur–II, Salepur–II, Batanal, Harinkhola–II, Mayapur–I, Tirol, Gourhati–I, Madhabpur and Mayapur–II.
- Khanakul I block consists of 13 gram panchayats, viz. Arunda, Khanakul–II, Pole–II, Thakuranichak, Balipur, Kishorepur–I, Rammohan–I, Ghoshpur, Kishorepur–II, Rammohan–II, Khanakul–I, Pole–I and Tantisal.
- Khanakul II block consists of 11 gram panchayats, viz. Chingra, Marokhana, Palashpai–I, Rajhati–II, Dhanyagori, Natibpur–I, Palashpai–II, Sabalsinghapur, Jagatpur, Natibpur–II and Rajhati–I.
- Goghat I block consists of seven gram panchayats, viz. Bali, Goghat, Nakunda, Saora, Bhadur, Kumarsa and Raghubati.
- Goghat II block consists of nine gram panchayats, viz. Badanganj–Falui–I, Hazipur, Mandaran, Badanganj–Falui–II, Kamarpukur, Paschimpara, Bengai, Kumarganj and Shyambazar.
- Pursurah block consists of eight gram panchayats, viz. Bhangamora, Dihibadpur, Pursurah–I, Shyampur, Chiladangi, Kelepara, Pursurah–II and Sreerampur.

== Police stations ==
Police stations in Arambag subdivision have the following jurisdiction:

Police station	Area covered km^{2}	Municipal town	CD Block
Goghat	n/a	-	Goghat I, Goghat II
Arambag	n/a	Arambag	Arambagh
Khanakul	n/a	-	Khanakul I, Khanakul II
Pursurah	n/a	-	Pursurah

== Blocks ==
Community development blocks in Arambag subdivision are:

CD Block	Headquarters	Area km^{2}	Population (2011)	SC %	ST %	Hindus %	Muslims %	Literacy rate %	Census Towns
Goghat I	Goghat	186.32	140,030	38.79	6.01	89.71	9.75	78.70	-
Goghat II	Kamarpukur	190.03	160,585	36.15	4.72	83.48	15.48	77.24	-
Arambagh	Arambag	269.31	285,207	37.57	1.46	77.99	21.71	79.01	-
Pursurah	Pursurah	100.42	173,437	21.35	0.48	83.51	16.28	82.12	-
Khanakul I	Khanakul	171.92	254,434	28.81	0.30	75.96	23.90	77.73	-
Khanakul II	Khanakul	121.83	184,734	30.07	0.02	84.21	15.67	79.16	-

== Economy ==
=== Industries ===
Arambagh Hatcheries Ltd. is a poultry and egg related industry based at Arambag. It was incorporated in 1973.

=== Agriculture ===
Hooghly is an agriculturally prosperous district of West Bengal. Although the economy has been shifting away from agriculture, it is still the pre-dominant economic activity and the main source of livelihood for the rural people of the district. One third of the district income comes from agriculture. Given below is an overview of the agricultural production (all data in tonnes) for Arambagh subdivision, other subdivisions and the Hooghly district, with data for the year 2013–14.

CD Block/ Subdivision	Rice	Wheat	Jute	Pulses	Oil seeds	Potatoes	Sugarcane
Goghat I	55,229	-	-	-	3,335	84,730	-
Goghat II	109,900	2	-	-	5,912	40,723	-
Arambagh	43,248	-	2,022	-	5,084	60,883	-
Khanakul I	27,093	24	55,380	-	1,898	187,352	-
Khanakul II	17,590	24	23,090	30	1,768	15,076	-
Pursurah	1,951	25	5,409	11	1,480	126,139	123,934
Arambagh subdivision	255,011	75	134,541	30	19,477	514,903	123,934
Chinsurah subdivision	235,561	92	111,218	4	10,362	812,808	162
Chandannagore subdivision	189,791	12	136,276	-	6,522	313,692	-
Srirampore subdivision	126,852	11	39,820	12	8,058	436,111	2,437
Hooghly district	807,215	190	421,855	46	44,419	2,077,514	126,533

=== Handloom weaving ===
The handloom sarees of Dhaniakhali, Begampur, Jangipara, Rajbalhat areas and dhutis of Haripal, Rajbalhat, Khanakul areas of Hooghly district are widely familiar.

== Education ==
Hooghly district had a literacy rate of 81.80% as per the provisional figures of the census of India 2011. Chinsurah subdivision had a literacy rate of 79.17%, Chandannagore subdivision 83.01%, Srirampore subdivision 86.13% and Arambag subdivision 79.05.

Given in the table below (data in numbers) is a comprehensive picture of the education scenario in Hooghly district for the year 2013-14:

Subdivision	Primary School		Middle School		High School		Higher Secondary School		General College, Univ		Technical / Professional Instt		Non-formal Education	
Subdivision	Institution	Student	Institution	Student	Institution	Student	Institution	Student	Institution	Student	Institution	Student	Institution	Student
Chinsurah	899	85,213	46	3,885	98	48,722	109	124,068	7	16,342	26	10,564	2,413	45,289
Chandannagore	606	53,382	32	3,312	46	22,000	77	89,132	6	20,450	6	778	1,297	29,127
Srirampore	577	64,207	25	3,611	65	37,997	97	108,199	8	16,631	3	793	1,337	33,060
Arambag	935	80,705	49	5,462	83	48,513	76	91,911	7	16,950	3	228	1,838	57,383
Hooghly district	3,013	283,407	152	16,270	292	157,232	359	413,310	28	70,373	38	12,363	6,885	164,859

Note: Primary schools include junior basic schools; middle schools, high schools and higher secondary schools include madrasahs; technical schools include junior technical schools, junior government polytechnics, industrial technical institutes, industrial training centres, nursing training institutes etc.; technical and professional colleges include engineering colleges, medical colleges, para-medical institutes, management colleges, teachers training and nursing training colleges, law colleges, art colleges, music colleges etc. Special and non-formal education centres include sishu siksha kendras, madhyamik siksha kendras, centres of Rabindra mukta vidyalaya, recognised Sanskrit tols, institutions for the blind and other handicapped persons, Anganwadi centres, reformatory schools etc.

The following institutions are located in Arambagh subdivision:

- Netaji Mahavidyalaya, a general degree college, was established at Arambag in 1948.
- Raja Rammohan Roy Mahavidyalaya, a general degree college, was established at Radhanagore in 1964.
- Sri Ramkrishna Sarada Vidyamahapith, a general degree college, was established at Kamarpukur in 1959.
- Arambagh Girls' College, a general degree college for girls, was established at Arambag in 1995.
- Kabikankan Mukundaram Mahavidyalaya, a general degree college, was established at Keshabpur in 2007.
- Aghorekamini Prakashchandra Mahavidyalaya, a general degree college, was established at Bengai in 1959.

== Healthcare ==
The table below (all data in numbers) presents an overview of the medical facilities available and patients treated in the hospitals, health centres and sub-centres in 2014 in Hooghly district.

Subdivision	Health & Family Welfare Deptt, WB				Other State Govt Deptts	Local bodies	Central Govt Deptts / PSUs	NGO / Private Nursing Homes	Total	Total Number of Beds	Total Number of Doctors*	Indoor Patients	Outdoor Patients
Subdivision	Hospitals	Rural Hospitals	Block Primary Health Centres	Primary Health Centres	Other State Govt Deptts	Local bodies	Central Govt Deptts / PSUs	NGO / Private Nursing Homes	Total	Total Number of Beds	Total Number of Doctors*	Indoor Patients	Outdoor Patients
Chinsurah	1	2	3	24	-	-	-	31	61	1,091	108	94,213	1,830,358
Chandannagore	1	3	-	8	-	-	-	41	53	828	56	70,724	1,105,060
Srirampore	3	2	2	12	-	-	-	80	99	1,894	85	63,619	1,252,941
Arambag	1	1	5	16	-	-	-	35	58	919	57	83,469	1,743,719
Hooghly district	6	8	10	60	-	-	-	187	271	4,732	306	312,025	5,932,078

.* Excluding nursing homes

Medical facilities in Arambagh subdivision are as follows:
Hospital: (Name, location, beds)
Arambagh Subdivisonal Hospital, Arambagh Municipality, 250 beds.

Rural Hospitals: (Name, block, location, beds)
Akri Shrirampur Rural Hospital, Pursurah CD Block, Akri Shrirampur, 30 bed.
Khanakul Rural Hospital, Khanakul I CD Block, Khanakul, 60 beds.
Natibpur Rural Hospital, Khanakul II CD Block, Natibpur, 30 beds.
Dakshin Narayanpur Rural Hospital, Arambagh CD Block, Dakshin Narayanpur, 30 beds.
Kamarpukur Rural Hospital, Goghat II CD Block, Kamarpukur, 60 beds.
Goghat Block Primary Health Centre, Goghat I CD Block, Goghat, 10 beds.

Primary Health Centres (CD Block-wise)(CD Block, PHC name/location, beds)
Arambagh CD Block: Malaypur, PO Keshabpur, (10 beds), Selepur, PO Chuadanga (10 beds), Muthadanga, PO Mayapur (10 beds), Dihibagnan (4 beds).
Goghat I CD Block: Nakunda (6 beds).
Goghat II CD Block: Jitarpur, PO Bhuskunda (2 beds), Taraghat (10 beds), Badanganj (2 beds).
Khanakul I CD Block: Ghoshpur, PO Pilkhan (10 beds), Tantisal (10 beds), Harimohan Golap Sundari, PO Raghunathpur (4 beds).
Khanakul II CD Block: Sabalsinghpur (10 beds), Morakhana (2 beds), Ramchandrapur (6 beds)
Pursurah CD Block: Fatepur, PO Parshyampur (4 beds), Dihibatpur, PO Alati (10 beds).

== Electoral constituencies ==
Lok Sabha (parliamentary) and Vidhan Sabha (state assembly) constituencies in Arambag subdivision were as follows:

Lok Sabha constituency	Reservation	Vidhan Sabha constituency	Reservation	CD Block and/or Gram panchayats and/or municipal areas
Arambagh	Reserved for SC	Pursurah	None	Pursurah community development block, along with Arunda, Balipur, Rammohan I, Rammohan II and Tantisal gram panchayats of Khanakul I CD Block, and Harinkhola I and Harinkhola II GPs of Arambagh CD Block
Arambagh	-	Arambag	Reserved for SC	Arambag municipality, and Arandi I, Arandi II, Batanal, Gaurhati I, Gaurhati II, Madhabpur, Mayapur I, Mayapur II, Malaypur I, Malaypur II, Salepur I, Salepur II and Tirol GPs of Arambagh CD Block
Arambagh	-	Goghat	Reserved for SC	Goghat I and Goghat II CD Blocks
Arambagh	-	Khanakul	Reserved for SC	Khanakul II CD Block, and Ghoshpur, Khanakul I, Khanakul II, Kishorpur I, Kishorpur II, Pole I, Pole II, Thakuranichak I, and Thakuranichak II GPs of Khanakul I CD Block
-	-	Other two assembly segments are in Chandannagore subdivision and one assembly segment is in Paschim Medinipur district	-	-
