= Iqbal Ahmed (politician) =

Indian politician

Member of Legislative Assembly for Khanakul Assembly constituency
- In office 2011–2021
- Preceded by: Banshi Badan Maitra
- Succeeded by: Susanta Ghosh

Personal details
- Born: Kolkata
- Died: 31 May 2024 Ripon Street Kolkata
- Party: All India Trinamool Congress
- Children: Sana Ahmed (daughter) and a son

Iqbal Ahmed was an Indian politician. In 2011 and 2016 he was elected as MLA of Khanakul Vidhan Sabha Constituency in West Bengal Legislative Assembly. He was a politician belonging to All India Trinamool Congress.

He was the younger brother of Sultan Ahmed, also a politician belonging to All India Trinamool Congress and a former Member of Parliament from Uluberia Lok Sabha constituency.

Ahmed died due to prolonged illness on 31 May 2024 at his residence in Ripon Street in Kolkata. He is survived by his wife and daughter, Sana Ahmed, and a son.
