= Khanakul Assembly constituency =

Khanakul
- Constituency No. 202 for the West Bengal Legislative Assembly
- Interactive Map Outlining Khanakul Assembly Constituency

Constituency details
- Country: India
- Region: East India
- State: West Bengal
- District: Hooghly
- Lok Sabha constituency: Arambagh
- Established: 1957
- Total electors: 219,368
- Reservation: None

Member of Legislative Assembly
- 18th West Bengal Legislative Assembly
- Incumbent Susanta Ghosh
- Party: BJP
- Alliance: NDA
- Elected year: 2026

Khanakul Assembly constituency is an assembly constituency in Hooghly district in the Indian state of West Bengal.

== Overview ==
As per orders of the Delimitation Commission, No. 202 Khanakul Assembly constituency is composed of the following: Khanakul II community development block, and Ghoshpur, Khanakul I, Khanakul II, Kishorpur I, Kishorpur II, Pole II, Thakuranichak I, and Thakuranichak II gram panchayats of Khanakul I community development block.

Khanakul Assembly constituency is part of No. 29 Arambagh Lok Sabha constituency (SC).

== Members of the Legislative Assembly ==
Election	Member	Party
Khanakul
1957 (Note: Khanakul had dual seat in 1957.)	Panchanan Digpati	Indian National Congress
1957	Prafulla Chandra Sen	Indian National Congress
1962	Krishna Pada Pandit	Indian National Congress
1967	Madan Saha	Communist Party of India (Marxist)
1969	Madan Saha	Communist Party of India (Marxist)
1971	Madan Saha	Communist Party of India (Marxist)
1972	Basudeb Hajra	Indian National Congress
1977	Panchanan Digpati	Janata Party
1982	Sachindra Nath Hazra	Communist Party of India (Marxist)
1987	Sachindra Nath Hazra	Communist Party of India (Marxist)
1991	Sachindra Nath Hazra	Communist Party of India (Marxist)
1996	Banshi Badan Maitra	Communist Party of India (Marxist)
2001	Banshi Badan Maitra	Communist Party of India (Marxist)
2006	Banshi Badan Maitra	Communist Party of India (Marxist)
2011	Iqbal Ahmed	Trinamool Congress
2016	Iqbal Ahmed	Trinamool Congress
2021	Susanta Ghosh	Bharatiya Janata Party
2026	Susanta Ghosh	Bharatiya Janata Party

== Election results ==
=== 2026 ===
2026 West Bengal Legislative Assembly election: Khanakul
Party	Candidate	Votes	%	±%
BJP	Susanta Ghosh	126,729	53.44	▲4.17
AITC	Palash Roy	92,246	38.9	▼4.46
ISF	Sheikh Saddam Hossain	8,021	3.38	▼0.63
Independent	Bikash Chandra Dolui	1,936	0.82	New entry
INC	Pradip Kumar Kar	1,933	0.82	New entry
NOTA	None of the above	1,695	0.71	▼0.79
Majority		34,483	14.54	▲8.63
Turnout		237,135	88.26	▲9.64
BJP hold		Swing		

=== 2021 ===
2021 West Bengal Legislative Assembly election: Khanakul
Party	Candidate	Votes	%	±%
BJP	Susanta Ghosh	107,403	49.27	▲40.33
AITC	Munshi Nazbul Karim	94,519	43.36	▼10.68
ISF	Faisal Khan	8,732	4.01	New entry
NOTA	None of the above	3,278	1.5	▼0.34
Majority		12,884	5.91	▼16.08
Turnout		217,991	78.62	▼0.27
BJP gain from AITC		Swing		

=== 2016 ===
2016 West Bengal Legislative Assembly election: Khanakul
Party	Candidate	Votes	%	±%
AITC	Iqbal Ahmed	106,878	54.04	▼1.52
CPI(M)	Islam Ali Khan	63,391	32.05	▼8.39
BJP	Bikash Chandra Dolui	17,686	8.94	▲4.95
NOTA	None of the Above	3,638	1.84	New entry
Independent	Chandan Mondal	2,451	1.24	New entry
Independent	Sanjib Karmakar	2,305	1.17	New entry
Independent	Subhasis Dutta	1,431	0.72	New entry
Majority		43,487	21.99	▲6.87
Turnout		1,97,780	78.89	▼5.14
AITC hold		Swing		

=== 2011 ===
2011 West Bengal Legislative Assembly election: Khanakul
Party	Candidate	Votes	%	±%
AITC	Iqbal Ahmed	102,450	55.56	
CPI(M)	Subhra Parui	74,571	40.44	
BJP	Arabinda Maity	7,360	3.99	
Majority		27,879	15.12	
Turnout		1,84,381	84.03	
AITC gain from CPI(M)		Swing		

=== 1957-2006 ===
In the 2006, 2001 and 1996 state assembly elections Banshi Badan Maitra of CPI(M) won the Khanakul assembly seat (SC) defeating Kalyan Maji of Trinamool Congress in 2006, Tarapada Dolui of Trinamool Congress in 2001, and Basudeb Hajra of Congress in 1996. Contests in most years were multi cornered but only winners and runners are being mentioned. Sachindra Nath Hazra of CPI(M) defeated Banshari Mohan Sardar of Congress in 1991, Basudeb Hajra of Congress in 1987 and 1982. Panchanan Digpati of Janata Party defeated Sachindra Nath Hazra of CPI(M) in 1977.

=== 1952-1972 ===
Basudeb Hajra of Congress won in 1972. Madan Saha of CPI(M) won in 1971, 1969 and 1967. Krishna Pada Pandit of Congress won in 1962. Panchanan Digpati and Prafulla Chandra Sen, both of Congress, won the dual seat at Khanakul in 1957.
