= Khanakul =

- Village
- Location in West Bengal, India Khanakul (India)
- Coordinates: 22.72919°N 87.866564°E
- Country: India
- State: West Bengal
- District: Hooghly
- Elevation: 24 m (79 ft)

Population (2011)
  - Total: 27,489

Languages
  - Official: Bengali, English
- Time zone: UTC+5:30 (IST)
- PIN: 712406
- Telephone/STD code: 03225
- Lok Sabha constituency: Arambagh
- Vidhan Sabha constituency: Khanakul
- Website: hooghly.gov.in

Khanakul is a village in Khanakul I CD block of Hooghly district in the state of West Bengal, India. Khanakul is the birthplace of Raja Rammohan Roy. It is famous for Ratnavali Temple, Gopinath Temple, Radhavallabh Temple, Ghontashor Temple. Khanakul can be reached conveniently by Bus from Kolkata or Tarakeswar. Tarakeswar Station is the nearest railway station from Khanakul. Khanakul pollution testing centre is for auto emission testing.

== Civic administration ==
=== Police station ===
Khanakul police station has jurisdiction over Khanakul I and Khanakul II CD blocks.

=== CD block HQ ===
The headquarters of Khanakul I and Khanakul II CD blocks are located at Khanakul.

== Demographics ==
According to the 2011 Census of India, Khanakul had a total population of 3,489 of which 1,756 (50%) were males and 1,733 (50%) were females. Population in the age range 0–6 years was 734. The total number of literate persons in Khanakul was 2,727 (86.76% of the population over 6 years).

== Geography ==
Cities and towns in Arambagh subdivision in Hooghly district
M: municipal city/ town, R: rural/ urban centre, H: historical/ religious centre
Owing to space constraints in the small map, the actual locations in a larger map may vary slightly

=== Location ===
Khanakul is located at 22.72919°N 87.866564°E.

=== Area overview ===
The Arambagh subdivision, presented in the map alongside, is divided into two physiographic parts – the Dwarakeswar River being the dividing line. The western part is upland and rocky – it is extension of the terrain of neighbouring Bankura district. The eastern part is flat alluvial plain area. The railways, the roads and flood-control measures have had an impact on the area. The area is overwhelmingly rural with 94.77% of the population living in rural areas and 5.23% of the population living in urban areas.

Note: The map alongside presents some of the notable locations in the subdivision. All places marked in the map are linked in the larger full screen map.
