= Mundeswari River =

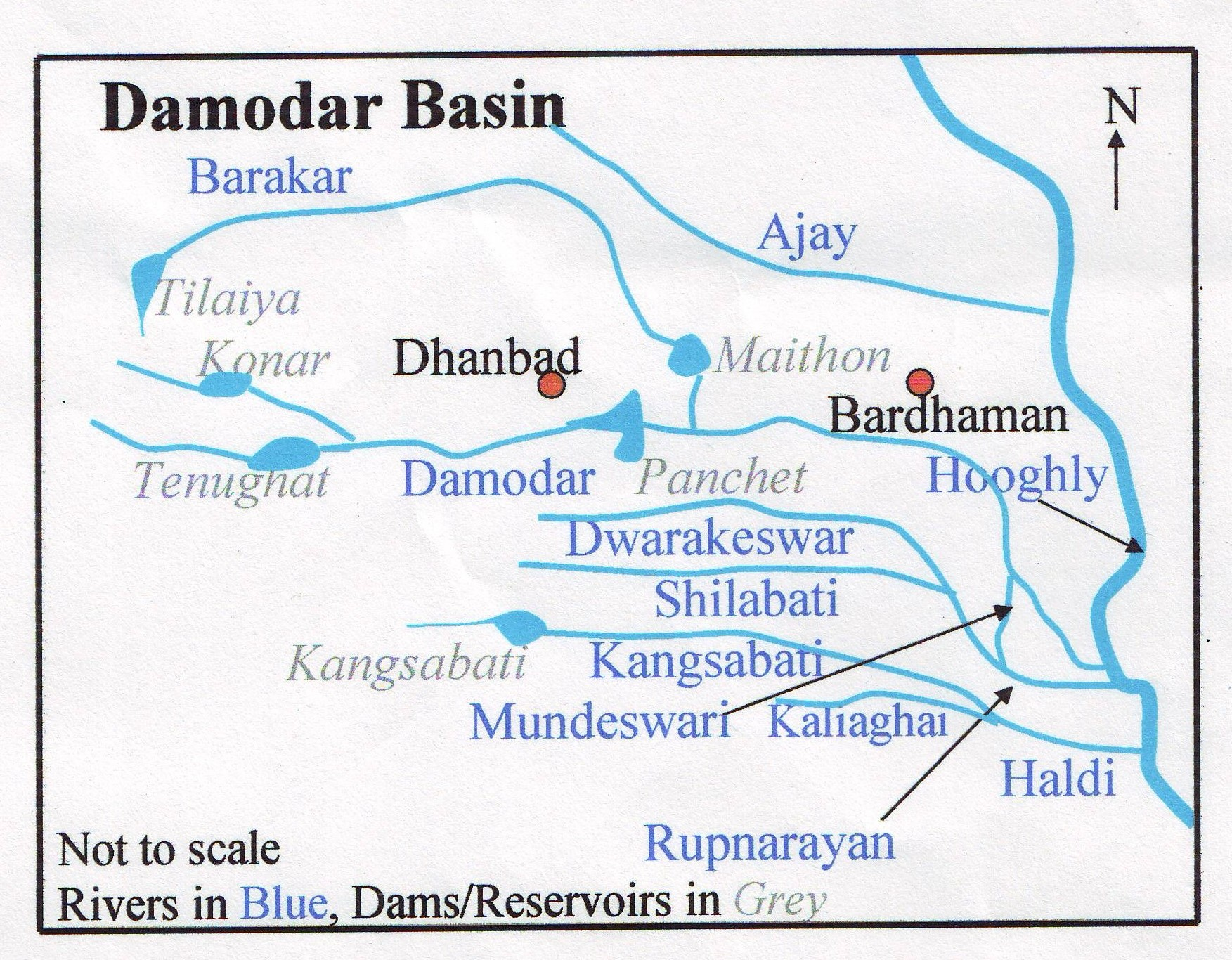

Location
- Country: India
- State: West Bengal

Physical characteristics
- Source: Damodar River
  - location: Bardhaman district, West Bengal
- Discharge
  - location: Rupnarayan River

Mundeswari river is a small river in West Bengal which causes floods in Hooghly, Purba Medinipur and Howrah districts during the monsoons. Any discharge above 2,000 cubic metres per second (70,000 cu ft/s) downstream of Durgapur Barrage occasionally causes the river to flood. It has been suggested that the banks of rivers such as the Mundeswari should be protected with embankments to prevent floods.

== History ==
The river is not mentioned in the 1910 district gazetteers, but it is mentioned in the 1994 Bardhaman District gazetteer.

During the devastating floods of 1914, the Damodar River split in two. One part joined the Mundeswari and the main channel of water of the Damodar now flows into the Mundeswari, turning it into a major river.

== Geography ==
It originates as a canal from Ramchandrapur, a village in Madabdihi at the police station in Raina II block of the Bardhaman district. It flows past Kaiti Chakbhura and enters the Hooghly District. It ultimately flows into the Rupnarayan River.
