= Madhabpur (disambiguation) =

Madhabpur refers to a village in Srirampore subdivision in Hooghly district, West Bengal, India.

It also refers to:

- Madhabpur Upazila, an upazila (sub-district) in Habiganj District, Sylhet Division, Bangladesh
- Madhabpur, Purba Medinipur, a village in Egra subdivision of Purba Medinipur district, West Bengal, India
- Madhabpur, Hooghly, a village in Arambagh subdivision of Hooghly district, West Bengal, India
