= Arambagh (community development block) =

- Community development block
- Coordinates: 22.88°N 87.78°E
- Country: India
- State: West Bengal
- District: Hooghly

Government
  - Type: Representative democracy

Area
  - Total: 269.31 km^{2} (103.98 sq mi)
- Elevation: 16 m (52 ft)

Population (2011)
  - Total: 285,207
  - Density: 1,059.0/km^{2} (2,742.9/sq mi)

Languages
  - Official: Bengali, English
- Time zone: UTC+5:30 (IST)
- PIN: 712601 (Arambagh); 712615 (Batanal); 712613 (Gourhati)
- Area code: 03211
- Vehicle registration: WB-15, WB-16, WB-18
- Literacy: 79.01%
- Lok Sabha constituency: Arambagh
- Vidhan Sabha constituency: Arambag, Pursurah
- Website: hooghly.gov.in

Arambagh is a community development block that forms an administrative division in Arambag subdivision of Hooghly district in the Indian state of West Bengal.

== Overview ==
The Arambagh CD Block is part of the Dwarakeswar-Damodar inter-riverine plain with alluvial soil.

== Geography ==
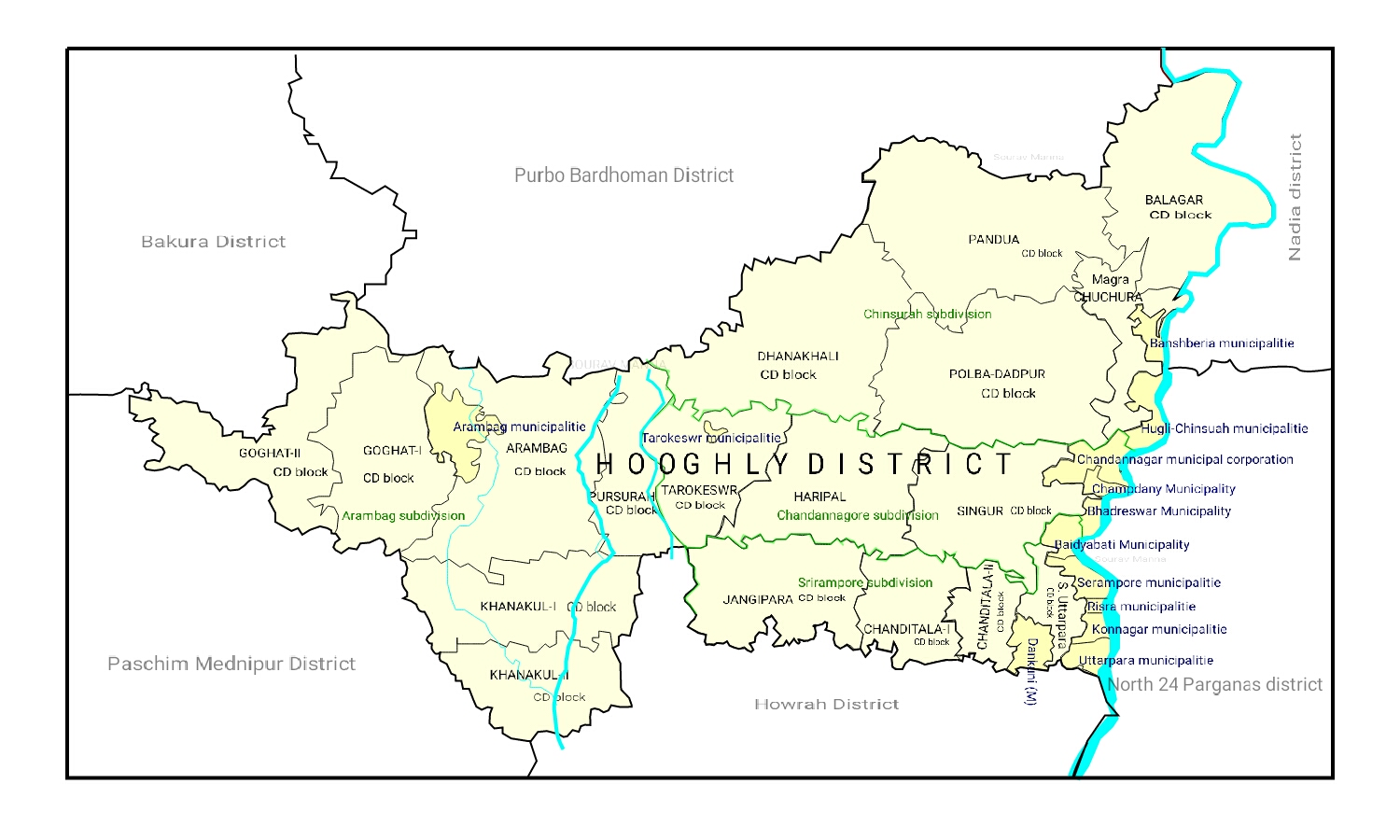
Map of Hooghly district showing CD blocks and municipal areas

Natibpur, a constituent panchayat of Khanakul II block, is located at 22°39′41″N 87°53′53″E.

Arambag is located at 22°53′N 87°47′E.

Arambagh CD Block is bounded by Raina II CD Block, in Bardhaman district, in the north, Pursurah CD Block in the east, Khanakul I CD Block in the south and Goghat I CD Block in the west.

It is located 72 km from Chinsurah, the district headquarters.

Arambagh CD Block has an area of 269.31 km^{2}. It has 1 panchayat samity, 15 gram panchayats, 221 gram sansads (village councils), 159 mouzas and 152 inhabited villages. Arambag police station serves this block. Headquarters of this CD Block is at Arambag.

Map of Arambag CD Block

Gram panchayats of Arambagh block/ panchayat samiti are: Arandi- I, Arandi- II, Batanal, Gourhati I, Gourhati II, Harinkhola I, Harinkhola II, Madhabpur, Mayapur I, Mayapur II, Molaypur I, Molaypur II, Salepur I, Salepur II and Tirol.

== Demographics ==
=== Population ===
As per the 2011 Census of India Arambagh CD Block had a total population of 285,207, all of which were rural. There were 146,041 (51%) males and 139,166 (49%) females. Population below 6 years was 31,356. Scheduled Castes numbered 107,158 (37.57%) and Scheduled Tribes numbered 4,171 (1.46%).

As per 2001 census, Arambagh block had a total population of 253,507, out of which 129,944 were males and 123,563 were females. Arambagh block registered a population growth of 13.86 per cent during the 1991-2001 decade. Decadal growth for Hooghly district was 15.72 per cent. Decadal growth in West Bengal was 17.84 per cent.

Large villages (with 4,000+ population) in Arambagh CD Block are (2011 census figures in brackets): Tirol (4,523), Batanal (5,585), Malaypur (8,465), Keshabpur (12,687), Mayapur (10,871), Salepur (5,965), Manikpat (4,097), Dahar Kundu (6,464), Gaurhati (13,084), Haraditya (4,011), Amgaon (4,022) and Dihi Bagnan (5,783).

Other villages in Arambagh CD Block include (2011 census figures in brackets): Madhabpur (1,263), Arandi (2,914), Bhalia (2,452), Dihi Bayara (3,697), Hamirbati (1,754), Hat Basantapur (2,878), Kanpur (2,657), Madhabpur (1,263) and Dakshin Narayanpur (2,070).

=== Literacy ===
As per the 2011 census the total number of literates in Arambagh CD Block was 200,570 (79.01% of the population over 6 years) out of which males numbered 1,11,189 (85.51% of the male population over 6 years) and females numbered 89,381 (72.19% of the female population over 6 years). The gender disparity (the difference between female and male literacy rates) was 13.31%.

As per the 2001 census, Arambagh block had a total literacy of 51.85 per cent. While male literacy was 74.51 per cent, female literacy was 41.04 per cent.

See also – List of West Bengal districts ranked by literacy rate

Literacy in CD blocks of
Hooghly district
Arambagh subdivision
Arambagh – 79.10
Khanakul I – 77.73
Khanakul II – 79.16
Goghat I – 78.70
Goghat II – 77.24
Pursurah – 82.12
Chandannagar subdivision
Haripal – 78.59
Singur – 84.01
Tarakeswar – 79.96
Chinsurah subdivision
Balagarh – 76.94
Chinsurah Mogra – 83.01
Dhaniakhali – 75.66
Pandua – 75.86
Polba Dadpur – 75.14
Srirampore subdivision
Chanditala I – 83.76
Chanditala II – 84.78
Jangipara – 75.34
Sreerampur Uttarpara – 87.33
Source: 2011 Census: CD Block Wise
Primary Census Abstract Data

=== Language and religion ===
Religion in Arambagh CD block (2011)
Hinduism	77.99%
Islam	21.71%
Other or not stated	0.30%

As per the 2011 census, majority of the population of the district belong to the Hindu community with a population share of 82.9% followed by Muslims at 15.8%. The percentage of the Hindu population of the district has followed a decreasing trend from 87.1% in 1961 to 82.9% in the latest census 2011. On the other hand, the percentage of Muslim population has increased from 12.7% in 1961 to 15.8% in 2011 census.

In 2011 census Hindus numbered 222,436 and formed 77.99% of the population in Arambagh CD Block. Muslims numbered 61,905 and formed 21.71% of the population. Others numbered 866 and formed 0.30% of the population.

Bengali is the predominant language, spoken by 99.19% of the population.

== Rural poverty ==
As per poverty estimates obtained from household survey for families living below poverty line in 2005, rural poverty in Arambagh CD Block was 49.89%.

== Economy ==
=== Livelihood ===
Livelihood
in Arambagh CD Block
1. Cultivators (17.4%)
2. Agricultural labourers (42.7%)
3. Household industries (5.13%)
4. Other Workers (34.8%)

In Arambagh CD Block in 2011, amongst the class of total workers, cultivators formed 17.38%, agricultural labourers 42.74%, household industry workers 5.13% and other workers 34.74%.

=== Infrastructure ===
There are 152 inhabited villages in Arambagh CD Block. 100% villages have power supply. 36 villages have more than one source of drinking water (tap, well, tube well, hand pump), 102 villages have only tube well/ borewell and 8 villages have only hand pump. 23 villages have post offices, 8 villages have sub post offices and 1 village has a post and telegraph office. 77 villages have landlines, 49 villages have public call offices and 150 villages have mobile phone coverage. 26 villages have pucca roads and 41 villages have bus service (public/ private). 26 villages have agricultural credit societies, 16 villages have commercial/ co-operative banks and 2 villages have bank ATMs.

Important Handicrafts of Hooghly District
- Zari Work on Sari - Pandua, Pursurah, Jangipara, Tarakeswar and other blocks - 3,000 families involved
- Chikon Embroidery – Babnan, Pandua, Singur - 2,500 families involved
- Silk and Cotton Printing – Serampore (Chanditala) - 300 families involved
- Brass and Bell Metal – Manikpat, Goghat, Arambagh - 150 families involved
- Conch Shell – Pandua, Khanakul, Makla, Chandannagar
- Jute Diversified Product – Baidyabati, Mogra
- Terracota – Chinsurah, Chandannagar, Baidyabati, Mogra

Source:District Human Development Report 2010: Hooghly P. 67

=== Agriculture ===
This is a rich agricultural area with several cold storages. Though rice is the prime crop of the district, the agricultural economy largely depends on potato, jute, vegetables, and orchard products. Though potato is cultivated in all the blocks of this district Dhaniakhali, Arambagh, Goghat, Pursurah, Haripal, Polba-Dadpur, Tarakeswar, Pandua and Singur contributed much of its production of this district.

Some of the primary and other hats or markets in the Arambgh CD Block are: Benia hat, Batanal market, Dhamsa market, Dangal market, Mayapur hat, Nawpara hat, Purba hat, Dhonda market and Goarhati market.

The Tebhaga movement launched in 1946, in 24 Parganas district, aimed at securing for the share-croppers a better position within the existing land relation structure. Although the subsequent Bargadari Act of 1950 recognised the rights of bargadars to a higher share of crops from the land that they tilled, it was not implemented fully. Large tracts, beyond the prescribed limit of land ceiling, remained with the rich landlords. From 1977 onwards major land reforms took place in West Bengal. Land in excess of land ceiling was acquired and distributed amongst the peasants. Following land reforms land ownership pattern has undergone transformation. In 2013–14, persons engaged in agriculture in Arambagh CD Block could be classified as follows: bargadars 9.06%, patta (document) holders 6.70%, small farmers (possessing land between 1 and 2 hectares) 1.72%, marginal farmers (possessing land up to 1 hectare) 24.77% and agricultural labourers 57.75%.

Arambagh CD Block had 150 fertiliser depots, 39 seed stores and 69 fair price shops in 2013-14.

In 2013–14, Arambagh CD Block produced 2,890 tonnes of Aman paddy, the main winter crop from 1,132 hectares, 40,358 tonnes of Boro paddy (spring crop) from 12,293 hectares, 516 tonnes of Aus paddy (summer crop) from 211 hectares, 2,022 tonnes of jute from 110 hectares and 60,883 tonnes of potatoes from 5,066 hectares. It also produced oilseeds.

In 2013–14, the total area irrigated in Arambagh CD Block was 21,003 hectares, out of which 4,000 hectares were irrigated by canal water, 2,850 hectares by tank water, 2,070 hectares by river lift irrigation, 2,690 hectares by deep tube wells and 9,393 hectares by shallow tube wells.

=== Banking ===
In 2013–14, Arambagh CD Block had offices of 10 commercial banks and 2 gramin banks.

== Transport ==
Arambagh CD Block has 3 ferry services and 8 originating/ terminating bus routes.

EMU services, earlier operating from Howrah to Tarakeswar, were extended to Arambagh P.C.Sen railway station on 16 September 2012, after completion of the electrified broad gauge Tarakewar-Arambagh sector of the Tarakeswar-Bishnupur extension of the Sheoraphuli–Bishnupur branch line.

It is part of Kolkata Suburban Railway system.

State Highway 7 (West Bengal) running from Rajgram (in Birbhum district) to Midnapore passes through this CD Block.

== Education ==
In 2013–14, Arambagh CD Block had 215 primary schools with 18,852 students, 7 middle schools with 342 students, 17 high schools with 10,885 students and 21 higher secondary schools with 22,107 students. Arambagh CD Block had 1 general colleges with 803 students and 468 institutions for special and non-formal education with 13,348 students

Kabikankan Mukundaram Mahavidyalaya, a general degree college, was established at Keshabpur in 2007.

In Arambagh CD Block, amongst the 152 inhabited villages, 5 villages had no school, 56 villages had more than 1 primary school, 94 villages had at least 1 primary school, 53 villages had at least 1 primary and 1 middle school and 38 villages had at least 1 middle and 1 secondary school.

== Culture ==
The Arambagh CD block has several heritage temples.

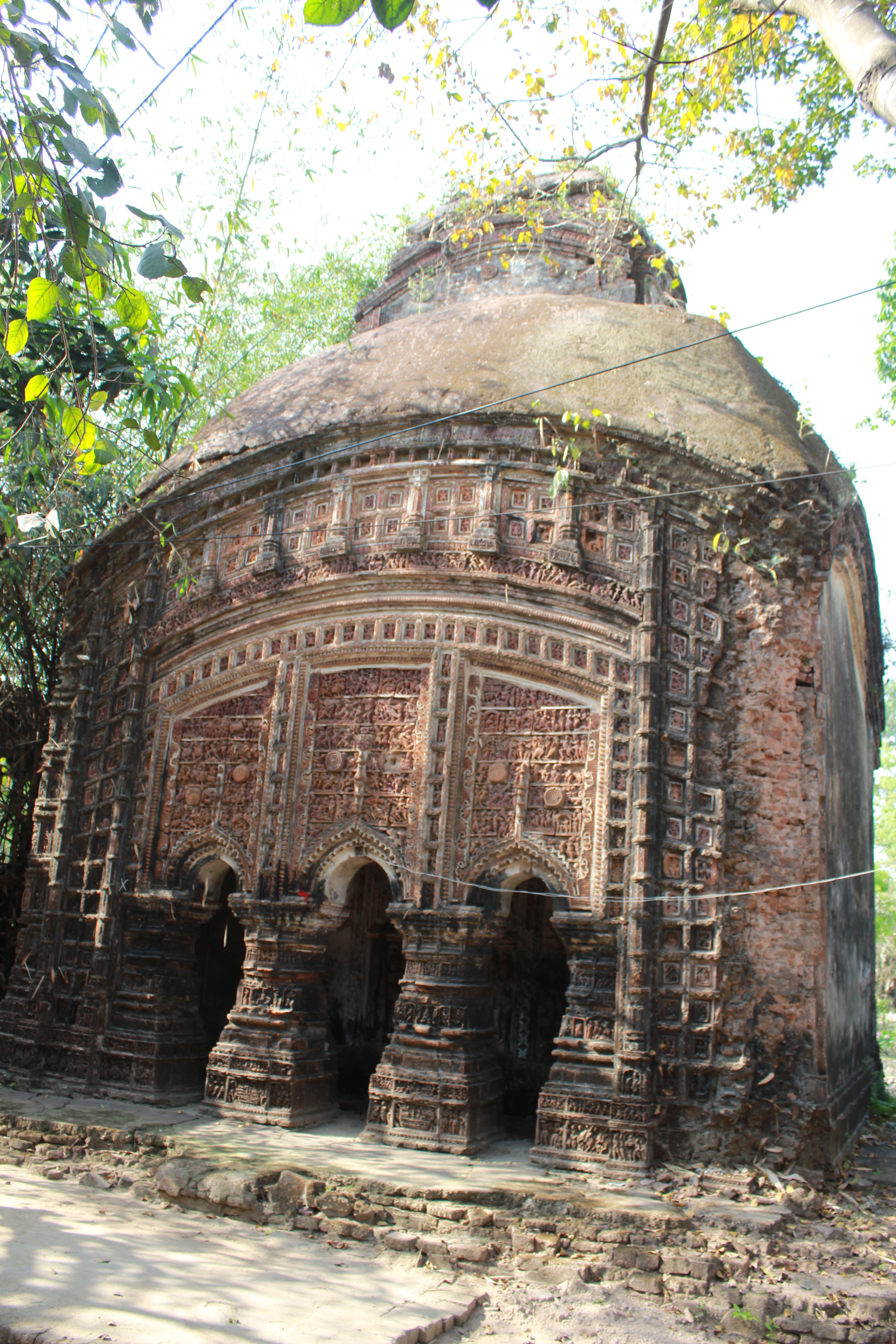
Bhalia: The at chala Raghunath temple (in picture), built in 1772, with terracotta relief.

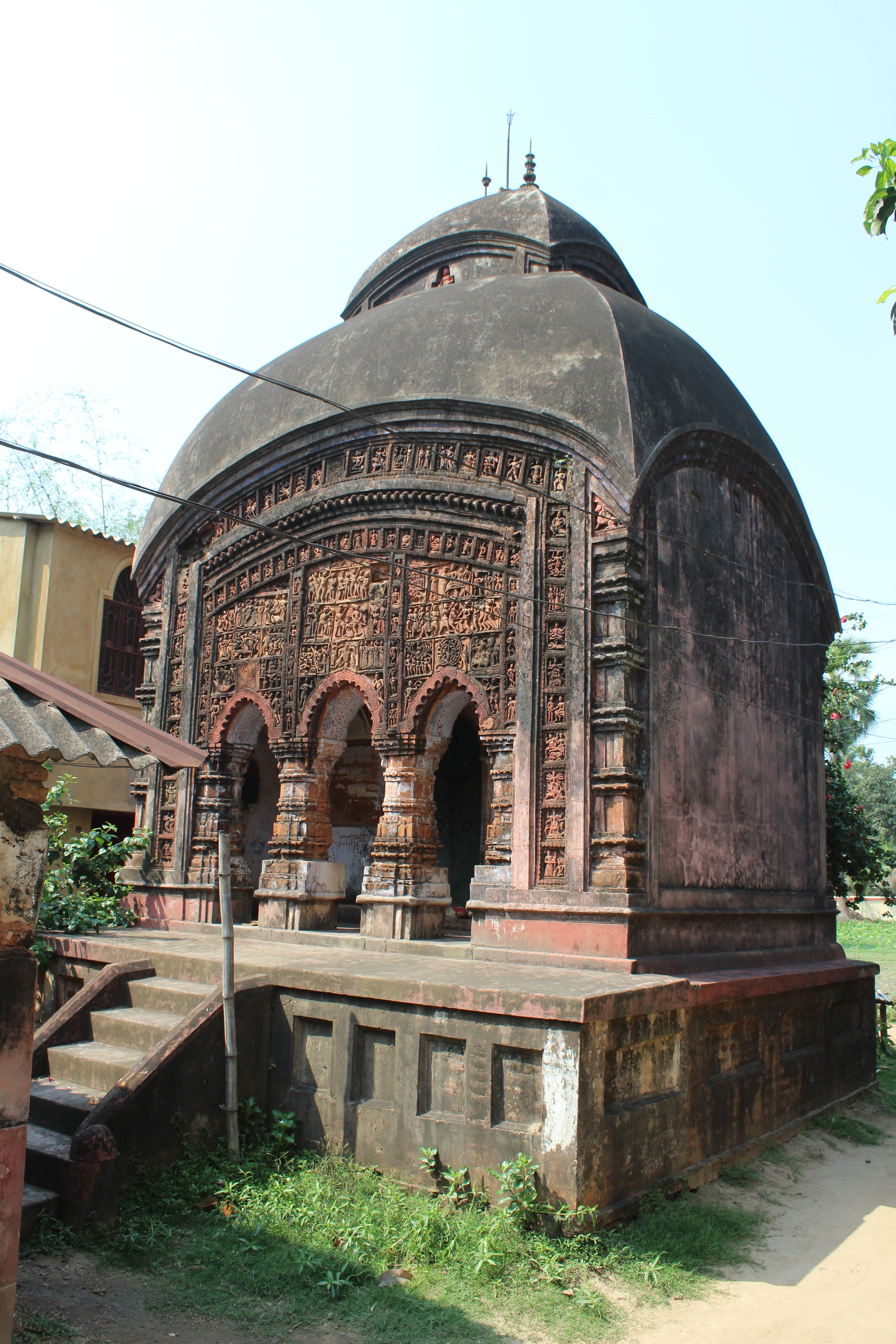
Dihi Bayara: Swarup Narayan temple (in picture), built in 1858, with extensive terracotta relief.

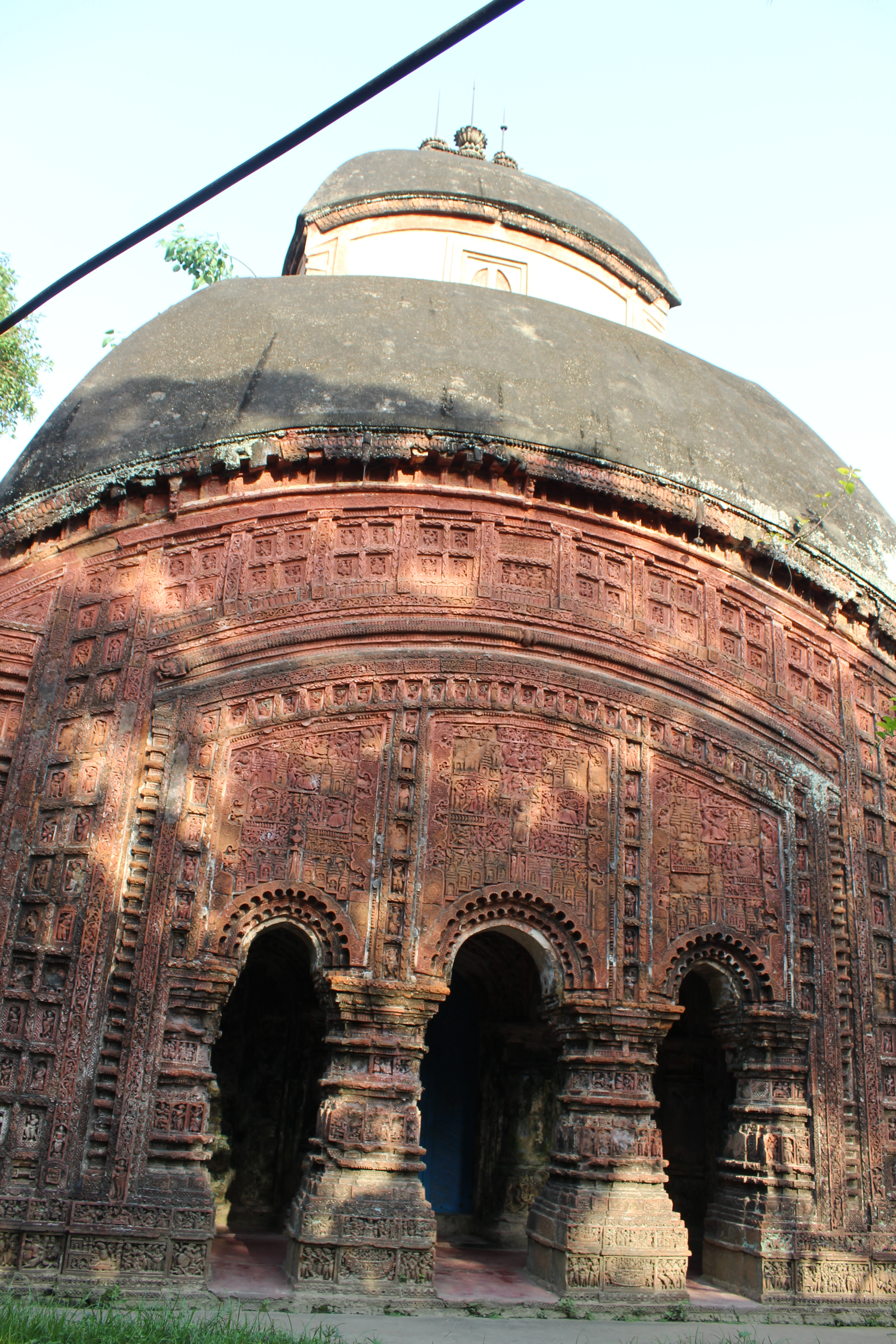
Hat Basantapur: Joy Chandi temple built in 1734 (in picture), with terracotta panels, dilapidated pancha ratna temple, Jora Shiva temple etc.

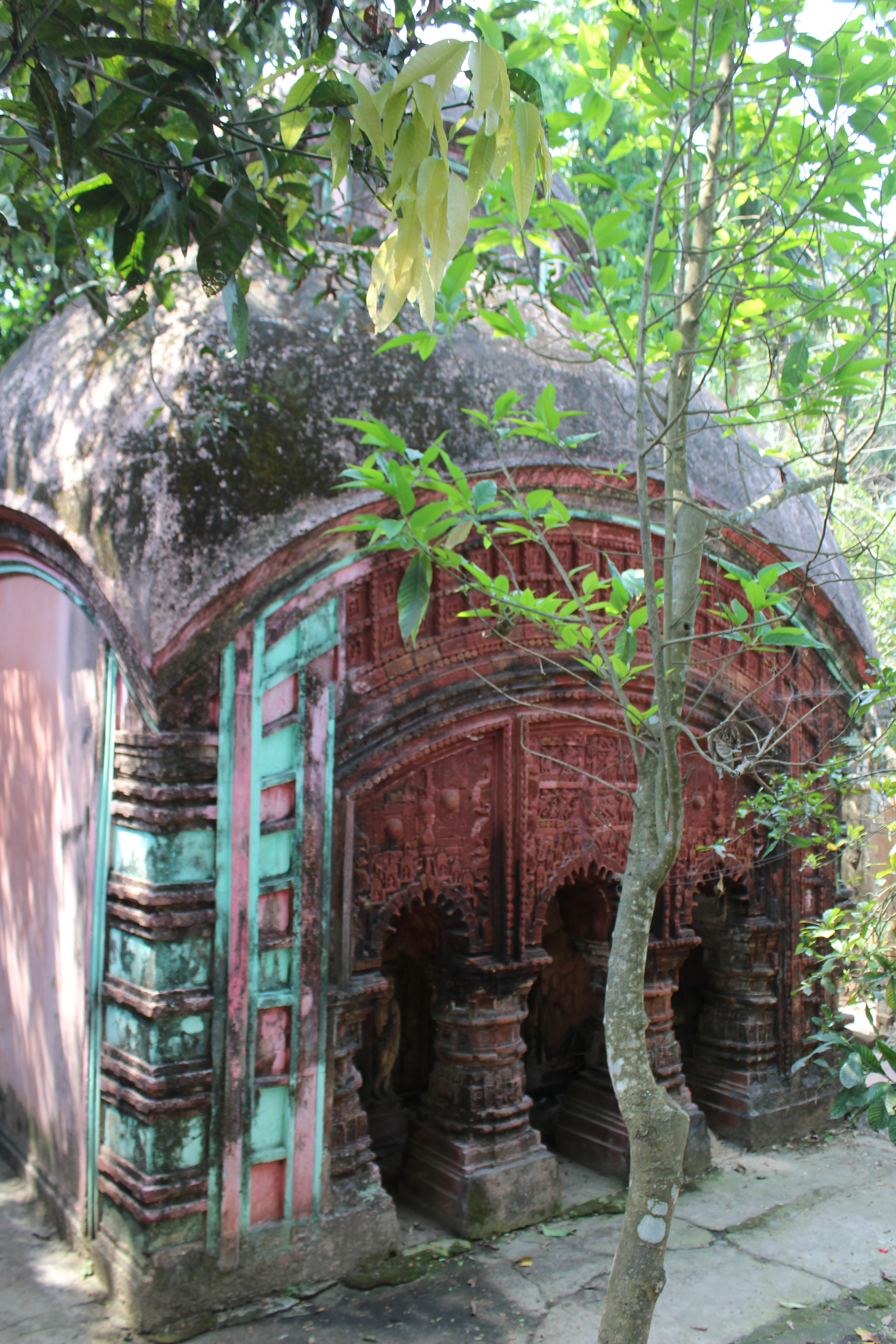
Hamirbati: Damodar temple built in 1704 (in picture), with terracotta façade.

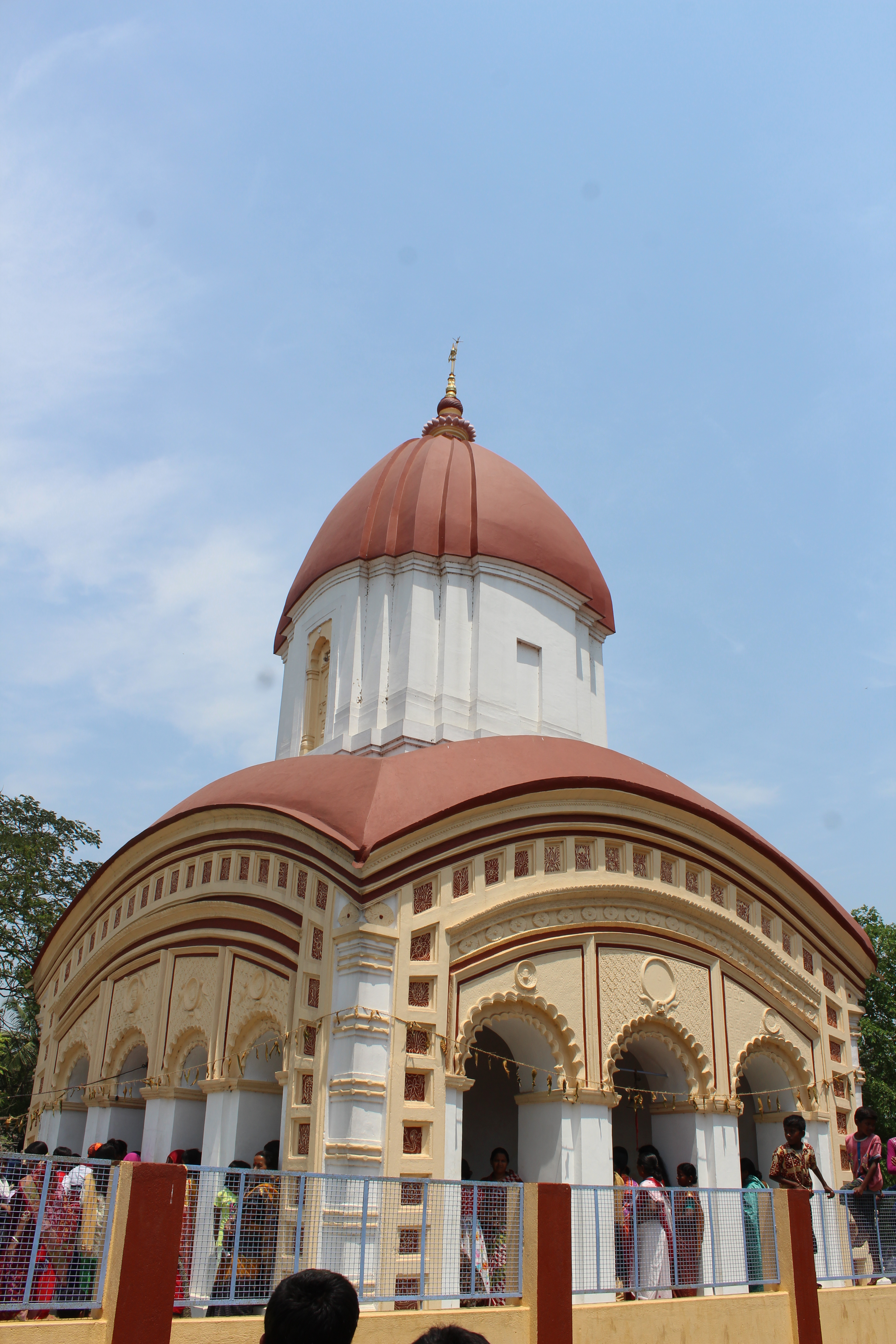
Kanpur: Kanakeshwar Shiva temple (in picture), ek ratna temple with verandah all around, uncommon design, 19th century built with slight plaster work.

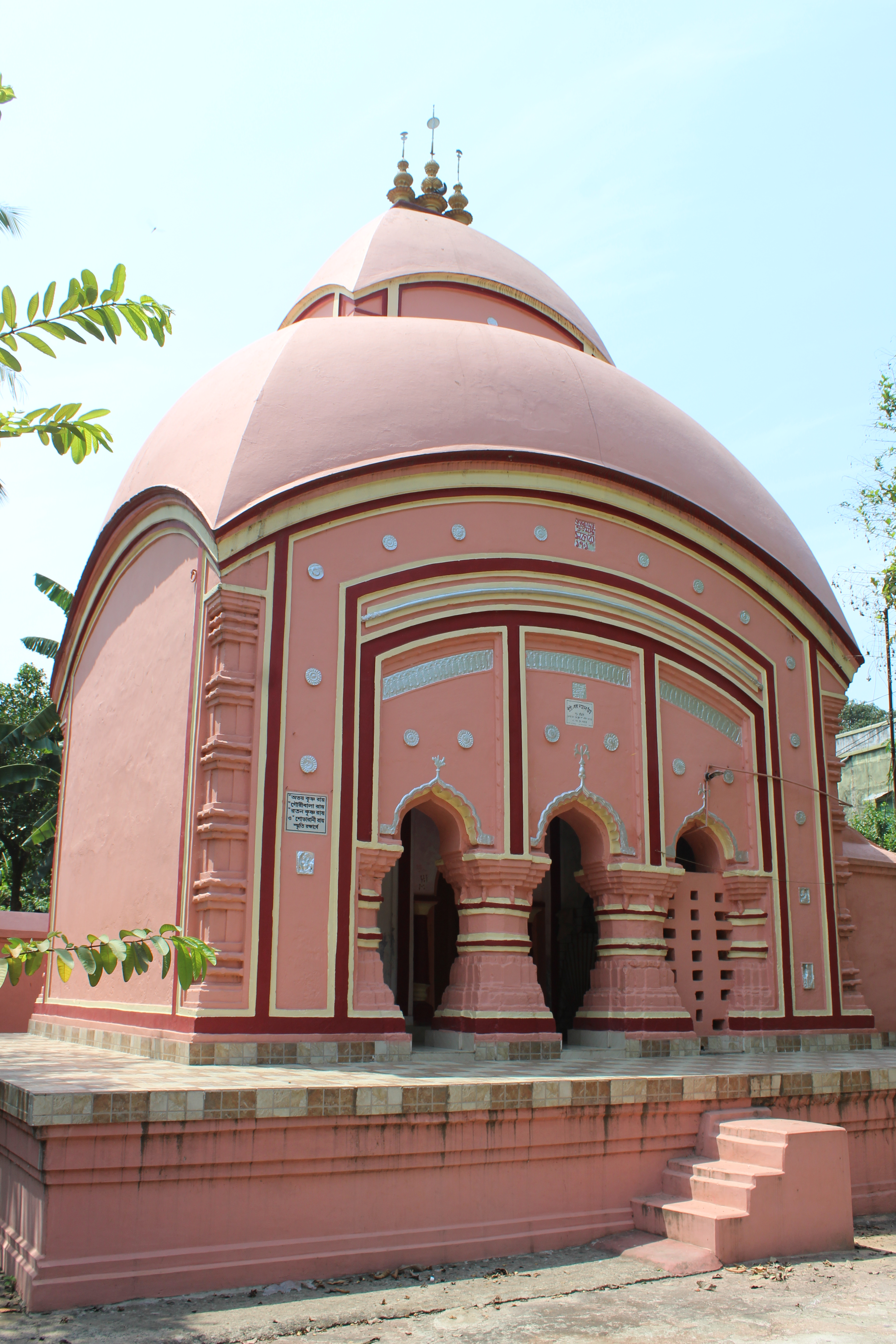
Madhabpur: Damodar temple (in picture), built in 1779.

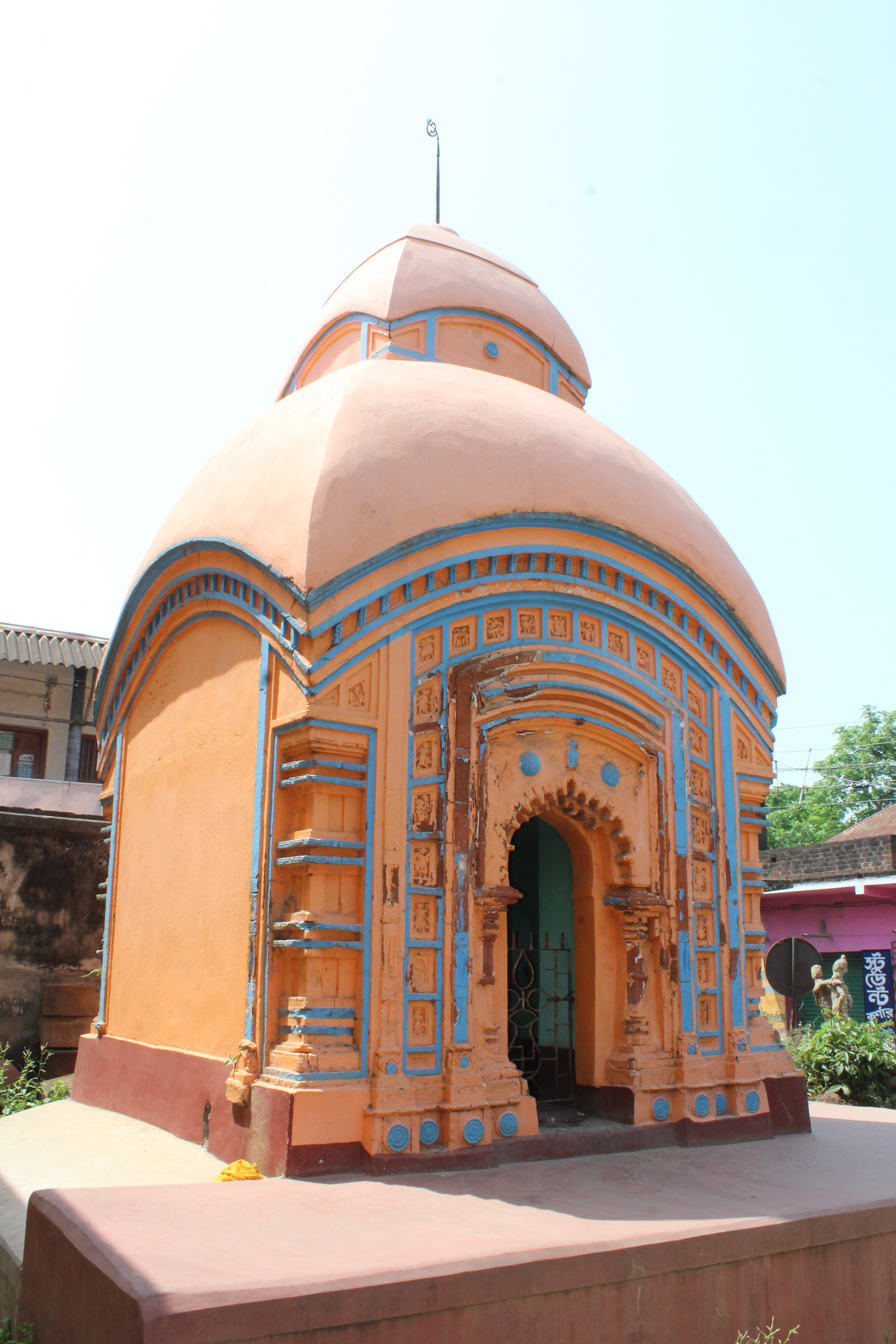
Gourhati: Gangadhar Shiva temple (in picture), built in 1752, with terracotta decoration, and other temples.

== Healthcare ==
In 2014, Arambagh CD Block had 1 block primary health centre, 4 primary health centre and 3 private nursing homes with total 65 beds and 6 doctors (excluding private bodies). It had 46 family welfare subcentres. 3,254 patients were treated indoor and 329,664 patients were treated outdoor in the hospitals, health centres and subcentres of the CD Block.

Arambagh CD Block has Dakshin Narayanpur Rural Hospital (with 30 beds) at Dakshin Narayanpur, Malaypur Primary Health Centre at PO Keshabpur (with 10 beds), Selepur PHC at PO Chuadanga (with 10 beds), Muthadanga PHC at PO Mayapur (with 10 beds) and Dihibagnan PHC (with 4 beds).
