= Dakshin Narayanpur =

- Village
- Location in West Bengal, India Dakshin Narayanpur (India)
- Coordinates: 22.795499°N 87.896372°E
- Country: India
- State: West Bengal
- District: Hooghly

Population (2011)
  - Total: 2,070

Languages
  - Official: Bengali, English
- Time zone: UTC+5:30 (IST)
- Lok Sabha constituency: Arambagh
- Vidhan Sabha constituency: Arambag
- Website: hooghly.gov.in

Dakshin Narayanpur is a village in the Arambagh CD block in the Arambagh subdivision of Hooghly district in the Indian state of West Bengal.

== Geography ==
Cities and towns in Arambagh subdivision in Hooghly district
M: municipal city/ town, R: rural/ urban centre, H: historical/ religious centre
Owing to space constraints in the small map, the actual locations in a larger map may vary slightly

=== Area overview ===
The Arambagh subdivision, presented in the map alongside, is divided into two physiographic parts – the Dwarakeswar River being the dividing line. The western part is upland and rocky – it is extension of the terrain of neighbouring Bankura district. The eastern part is flat alluvial plain area. The railways, the roads and flood-control measures have had an impact on the area. The area is overwhelmingly rural with 94.77% of the population living in rural areas and 5.23% of the population living in urban areas.

Note: The map alongside presents some of the notable locations in the subdivision. All places marked in the map are linked in the larger full screen map.

=== Location ===
Dakshin Narayanpur is located at 22.795499°N 87.896372°E

== Demographics ==
As per the 2011 Census of India, Dakshin Narayanpur had a total population of 2,070 of which 1,047 (51%) were males and 1,023 (49%) were females. Population in the age range 0–6 years was 245. The total number of literate persons in Dakshin Narayanpur was 1,540 (84.38% of the population over 6 years).

== Healthcare ==
Dakshin Narayanpur Rural Hospital with 30 beds is the major government medical facility in Arambagh CD block.
