= Kanpur, Hooghly =

Kanpur
- Village
- Location in West Bengal, India Kanpur (India)
- Coordinates: 22.8363°N 87.8276°E
- Country: India
- State: West Bengal
- District: Hooghly

Population (2011)
  - Total: 2,657

Languages
  - Official: Bengali, English
- Time zone: UTC+5:30 (IST)
- PIN: 712413
- Telephone/STD code: 03211
- Lok Sabha constituency: Arambagh
- Vidhan Sabha constituency: Arambag
- Website: hooghly.gov.in

Kanpur is a village in the Arambagh CD block in the Arambagh subdivision of Hooghly district in the Indian state of West Bengal.

== Geography ==
Cities and towns in Arambagh subdivision in Hooghly district
M: municipal city/ town, R: rural/ urban centre, H: historical/ religious centre
Owing to space constraints in the small map, the actual locations in a larger map may vary slightly

=== Location ===
Kanpur is located at 22.8363°N 87.8276°E

=== Area overview ===
The Arambagh subdivision, presented in the map alongside, is divided into two physiographic parts – the Dwarakeswar River being the dividing line. The western part is upland and rocky – it is extension of the terrain of neighbouring Bankura district. The eastern part is flat alluvial plain area. The railways, the roads and flood-control measures have had an impact on the area. The area is overwhelmingly rural with 94.77% of the population living in rural areas and 5.23% of the population living in urban areas.

Note: The map alongside presents some of the notable locations in the subdivision. All places marked in the map are linked in the larger full screen map.

== Demographics ==
As per the 2011 Census of India, Kanpur had a total population of 2,657 of which 1,361 (51%) were males and 1,296 (49%) were females. Population in the age range 0–6 years was 260. The total number of literate persons in Kanpur was 1,967 (82.06% of the population over 6 years).

== Culture ==
David J. McCutchion mentions the Kanakesvara temple as an eka ratna with open verandah all round having arhes on wall sections He feels that such eka ratna design may have originated from the rekha deul. It is brick temple, possibly built in the 19th century, having slight plasterwork.

The photographer has added a note: The Kanakeswar Shiva temple is a prominent Hindu religious centre in the area. The Gajan festival of Lord Shiva and the Kalu Rai fair are celebrated enthusiastically.

== Kanpur picture gallery ==
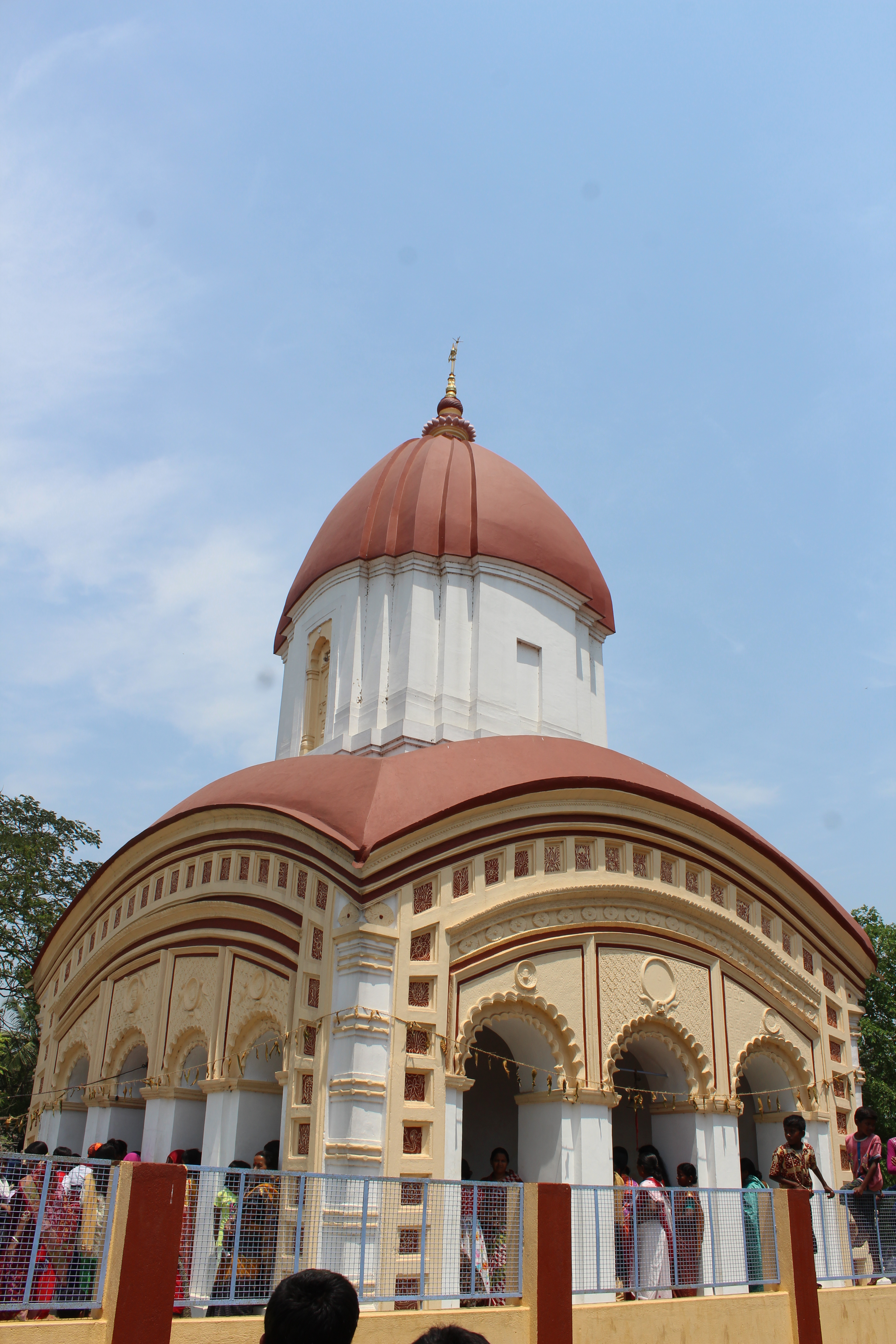
Kanakeswar Shiva temple, eka ratna, with verandah all round.

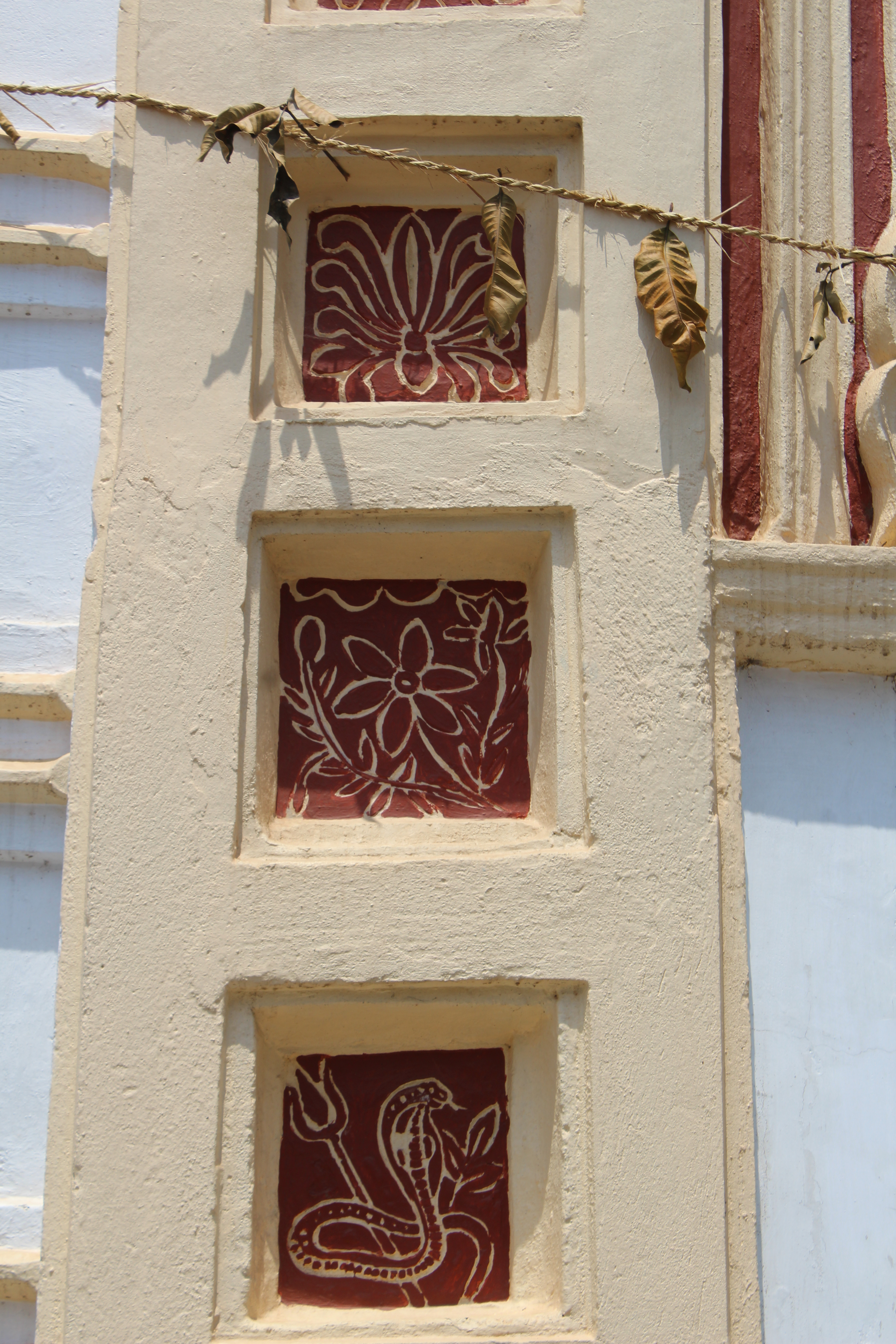
Plaster work

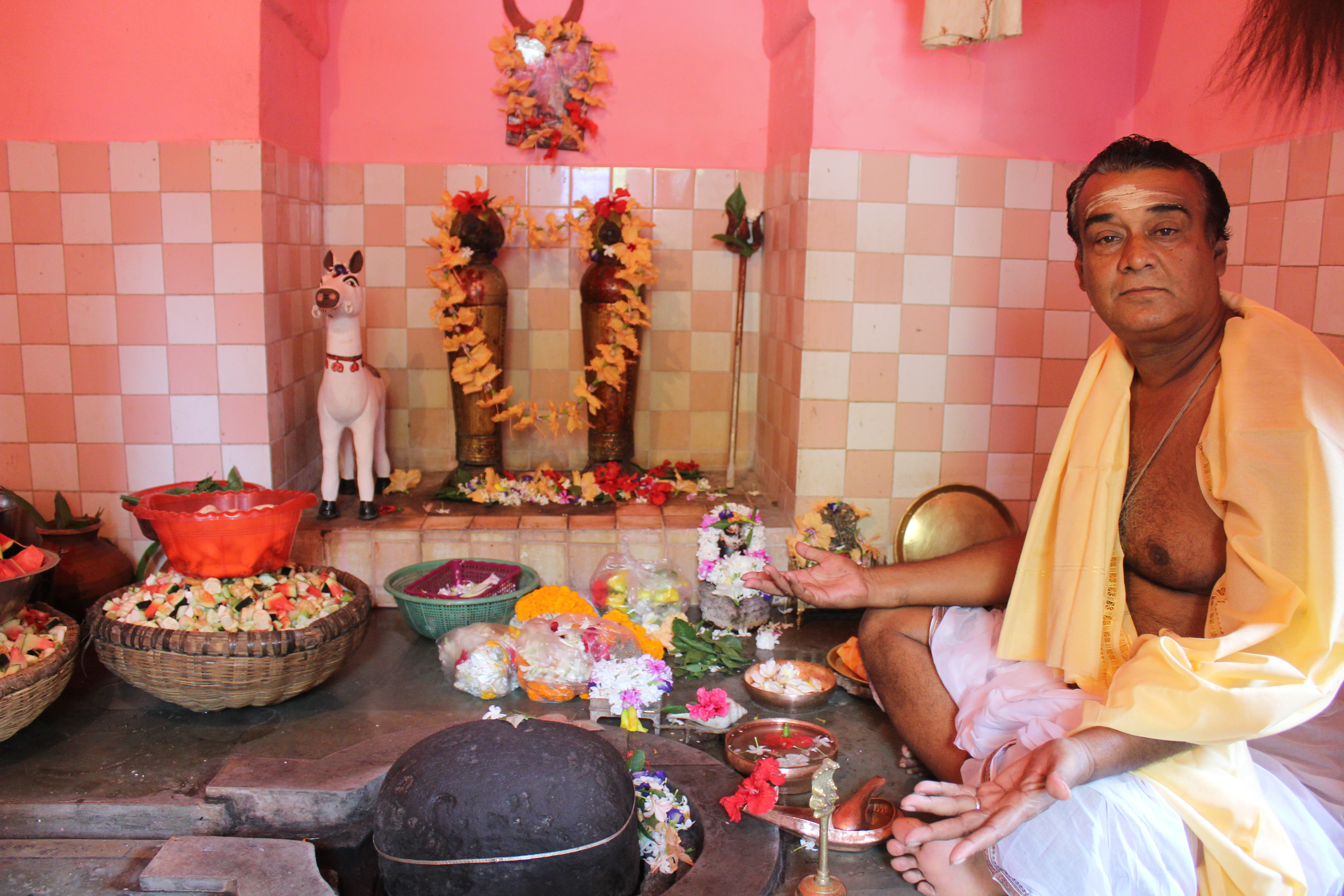
Inside the temple
