= Gourhati =

- Village
- Location in West Bengal, India Gourhati (India)
- Coordinates: 22.7756000°N 87.8083570°E
- Country: India
- State: West Bengal
- District: Hooghly
- Elevation: 5 m (16 ft)

Population (2011)
  - Total: 13,084

Languages
  - Official: Bengali, English
- Time zone: UTC+5:30 (IST)
- ISO 3166 code: IN-WB
- Sex ratio: 921 ♂/♀

Gourhati is a village in the Arambagh CD block in the Arambagh subdivision of the Hooghly district in the Indian state of West Bengal.

== Geography ==
Cities and towns in Arambagh subdivision in Hooghly district
M: municipal city/ town, R: rural/ urban centre, H: historical/ religious centre
Owing to space constraints in the small map, the actual locations in a larger map may vary slightly

=== Location ===
Gourhati is located at 22°46′32″N 87°48′30″E.

=== Area overview ===
The Arambagh subdivision, presented in the map alongside, is divided into two physiographic parts – the Dwarakeswar River being the dividing line. The western part is upland and rocky – it is extension of the terrain of neighbouring Bankura district. The eastern part is flat alluvial plain area. The railways, the roads and flood-control measures have had an impact on the area. The area is overwhelmingly rural with 94.77% of the population living in rural areas and 5.23% of the population living in urban areas.

Note: The map alongside presents some of the notable locations in the subdivision. All places marked in the map are linked in the larger full screen map.

== Demographics ==
As per the 2011 Census of India, Gaurhati had a total population of 13,084 of which 6,716 (51%) were males and 6,368 (49%) were females. Population in the age range 0–6 years was 1,380. The total number of literate persons in Gaurhati was 9,442 (80.67% of the population over 6 years).

== Education ==
There (Gourhati-II) are two High Schools, one for Girls (Up to 10th Class, Name - Gourhati Durgadas Balika Vidyalaya) and another for Boys (Up to 12 Class, Class 5th to 10th for Boys, after 10th class Co-ed, Name - Gourhati Haradas Institution)

== Culture ==
David J. McCutchion mentions:

- Gangadhara Siva temple as a small at chala having a single entrance, with terracotta decoration, built in 1752.
- Dolmancha as a pancha ratna with crude terracotta figures.

== Gourhati picture gallery ==
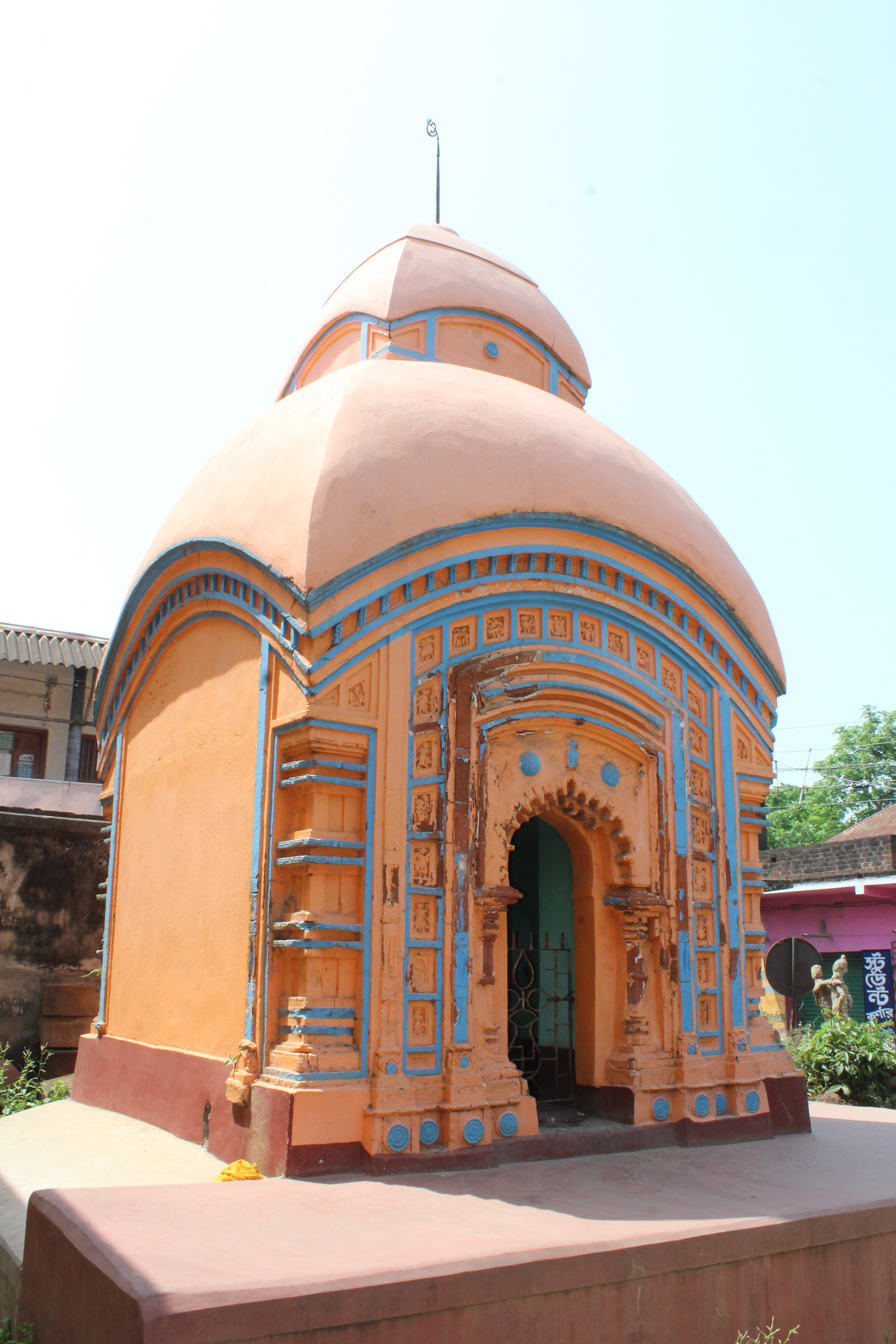
Gangadhara Siva temple, at chala built in 1752

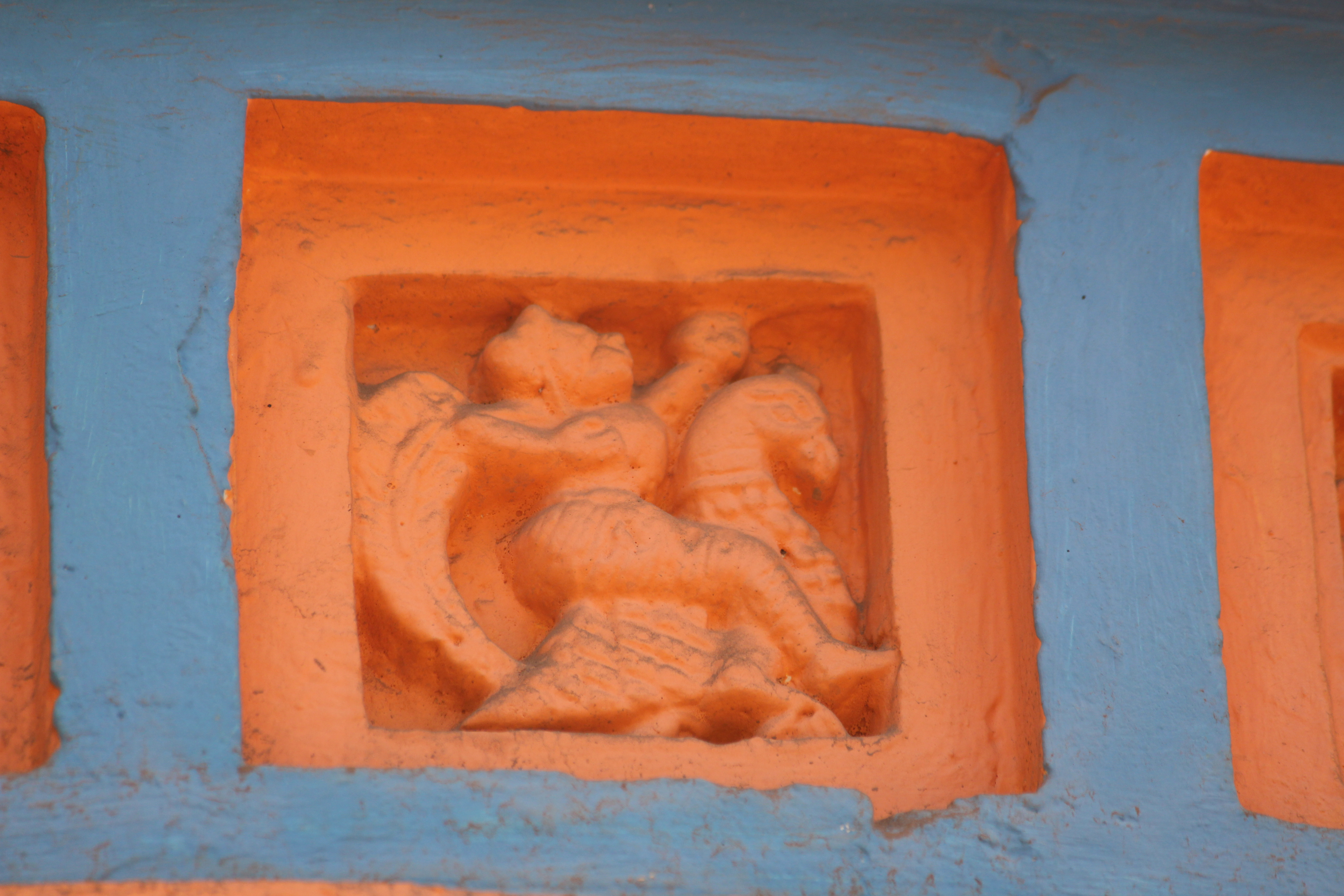
Terracota decoration in Gangadhar Siva temple

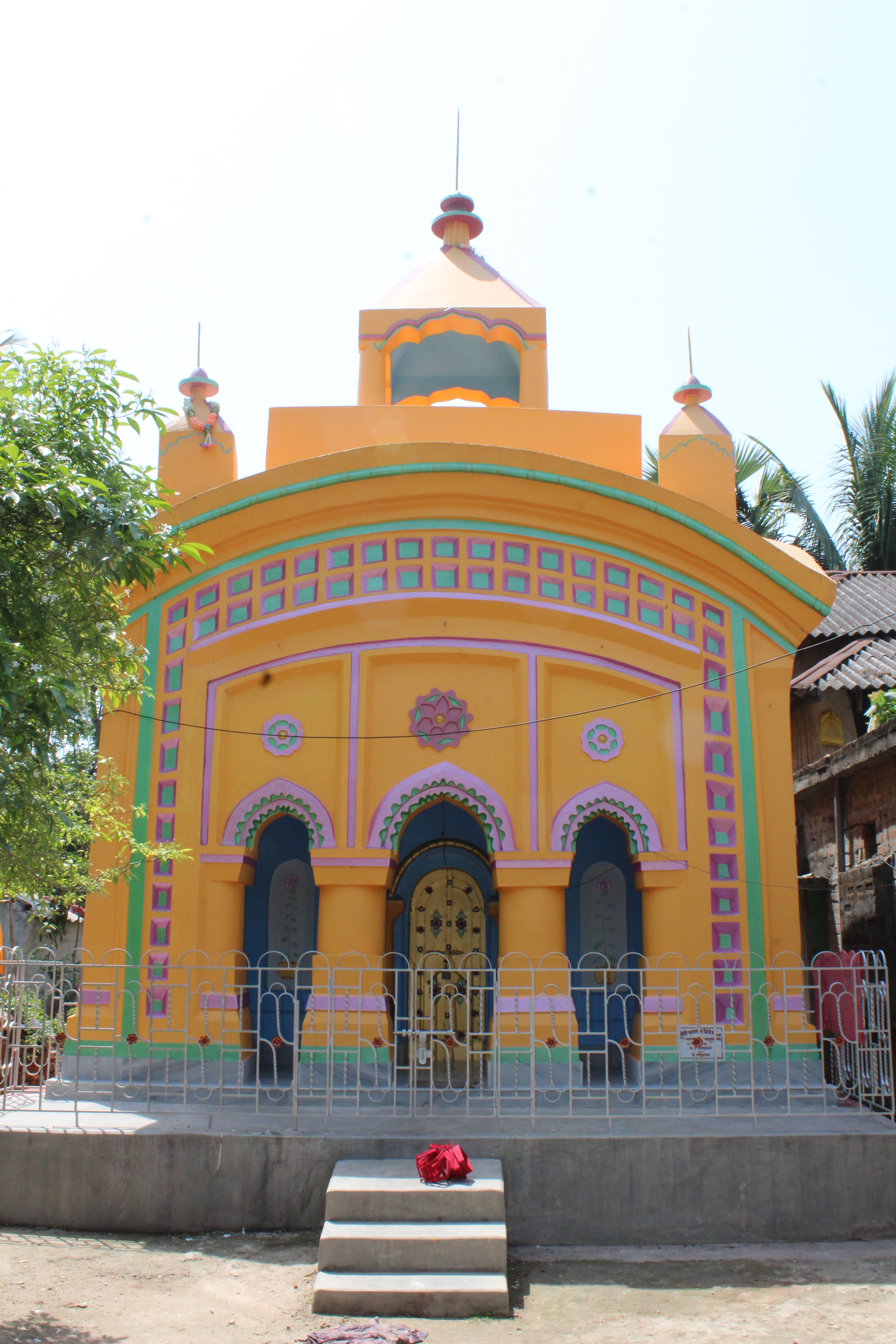
Damodarjiu temple, pancha ratna

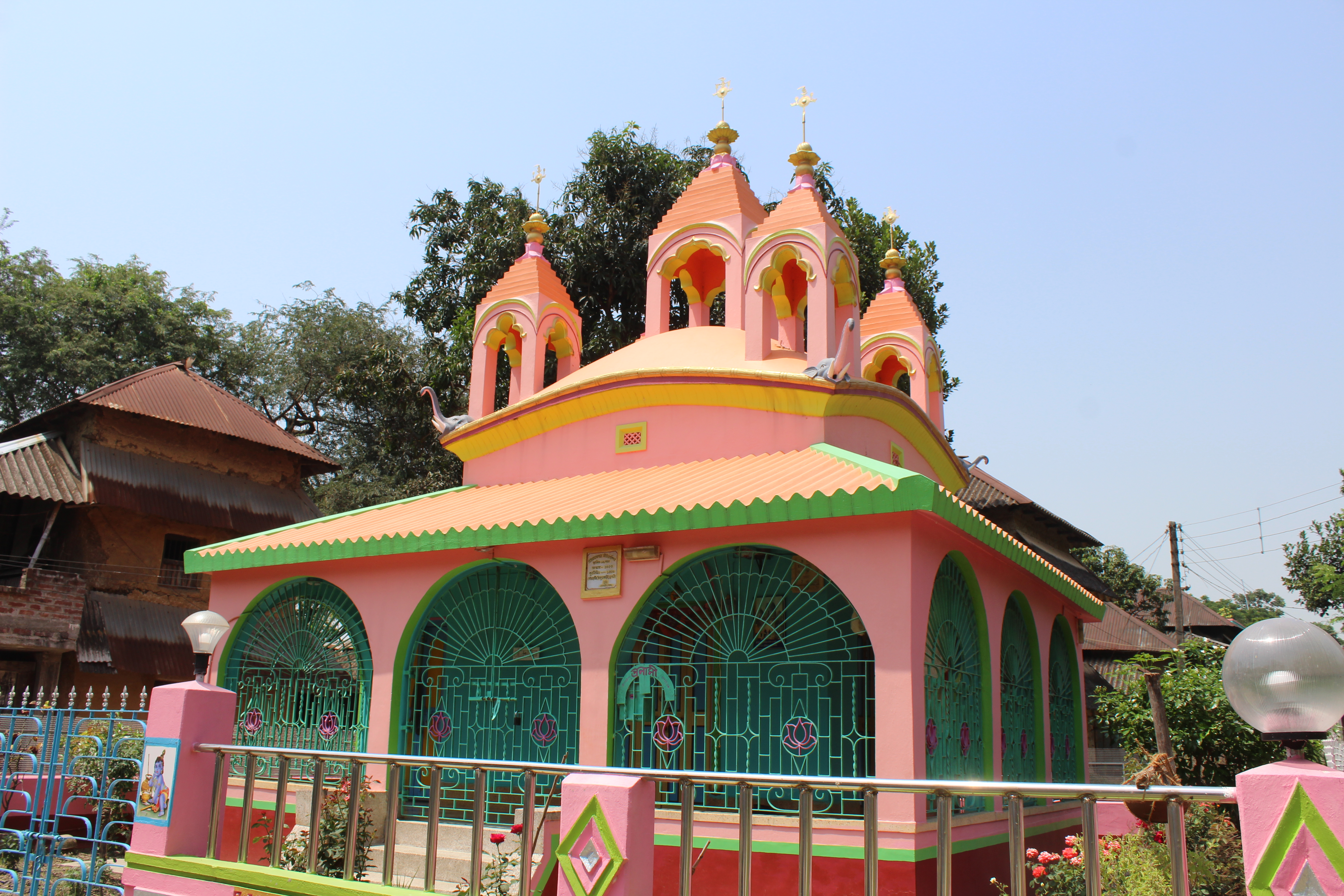
Ram Gopal temple, pancha ratna

Note: Some pictures are wrongly marked as belonging to Basudebpur. This should be ignored. It has been taken care of at the time of categorisation.
