= Keshabpur, Hooghly =

Keshabpur
- Village
- Location in West Bengal, India Keshabpur (India)
- Coordinates: 22.8875°N 87.8987°E
- Country: India
- State: West Bengal
- District: Hooghly

Population (2011)
  - Total: 12,687

Languages
  - Official: Bengali, English
- Time zone: UTC+5:30 (IST)
- Telephone/STD code: 03211
- Lok Sabha constituency: Arambagh
- Vidhan Sabha constituency: Arambag
- Website: hooghly.gov.in

Keshabpur is a village in the Aramgah CD block in the Arambag subdivision of the Hooghly district in the state of West Bengal, India.

== Geography ==
Cities and towns in Arambagh subdivision in Hooghly district
M: municipal city/ town, R: rural/ urban centre, H: historical/ religious centre
Owing to space constraints in the small map, the actual locations in a larger map may vary slightly

=== Location ===
Keshabpur is located at 22.8875°N 87.8987°E.

The Mundeswari flows past Keshabpur.

=== Area overview ===
The Arambagh subdivision, presented in the map alongside, is divided into two physiographic parts – the Dwarakeswar River being the dividing line. The western part is upland and rocky – it is the extension of the terrain of neighbouring Bankura district. The eastern part is flat alluvial plain area. The railways, the roads and flood-control measures have had an impact on the area. The area is overwhelmingly rural with 94.77% of the population living in rural areas and 5.23% in urban areas.

Note: The map alongside presents some of the notable locations in the subdivision. All places marked in the map are linked in the larger full screen map.

== Demographics ==
According to the 2011 Census of India, Keshabpur had a total population of 12,687 of which 6,521 (51%) were males and 6,166 (49%) were females. Population in the age range 0–6 years was 1,485. The total number of literate persons in Keshabpur was 8,910 (79.54% of the population over 6 years).

== Education ==
Kabikankan Mukundaram Mahavidyalaya, a general degree college, was established at Keshabpur in 2007. Kabikankan Mukundaram Chakraborty had contributed to the Chandimangal, an important subgenre of mangalkavya, the most significant genre of medieval Bengali literature and panchalis (ballads celebrating the glory of particular deities). It is affiliated with the University of Burdwan and offers courses in arts.
