= Hat Basantapur =

- Village
- Location in West Bengal, India Hat Basantapur (India)
- Coordinates: 22.8665°N 87.8423°E
- Country: India
- State: West Bengal
- District: Hooghly

Population (2011)
  - Total: 2,878

Languages
  - Official: Bengali, English
- Time zone: UTC+5:30 (IST)
- PIN: 712413
- Telephone/STD code: 03211
- Lok Sabha constituency: Arambagh
- Vidhan Sabha constituency: Arambag
- Website: hooghly.gov.in

Hat Basantapur (also written as Hatbasantapur) is a village in the Arambagh CD block in the Arambagh subdivision of Hooghly district in the Indian state of West Bengal.

== Geography ==
Cities and towns in Arambagh subdivision in Hooghly district
M: municipal city/ town, R: rural/ urban centre, H: historical/ religious centre
Owing to space constraints in the small map, the actual locations in a larger map may vary slightly

=== Location ===
Hat Basantapur is located at 22.8665°N 87.8423°E

=== Area overview ===
The Arambagh subdivision, presented in the map alongside, is divided into two physiographic parts – the Dwarakeswar River being the dividing line. The western part is upland and rocky – it is extension of the terrain of neighbouring Bankura district. The eastern part is flat alluvial plain area. The railways, the roads and flood-control measures have had an impact on the area. The area is overwhelmingly rural with 94.77% of the population living in rural areas and 5.23% in urban areas.

Note: The map alongside presents some of the notable locations in the subdivision. All places marked in the map are linked in the larger full screen map.

== Demographics ==
As per the 2011 Census of India, Hat Basantapur had a population of 2,878 of which 1,442 (50%) were males and 1,436 (50%) females. Population in the age range 0–6 years was 275. The number of literate persons in Hat Basantapur was 957 (82.37% of the population over 6 years).

== Hat Basantapur picture gallery ==
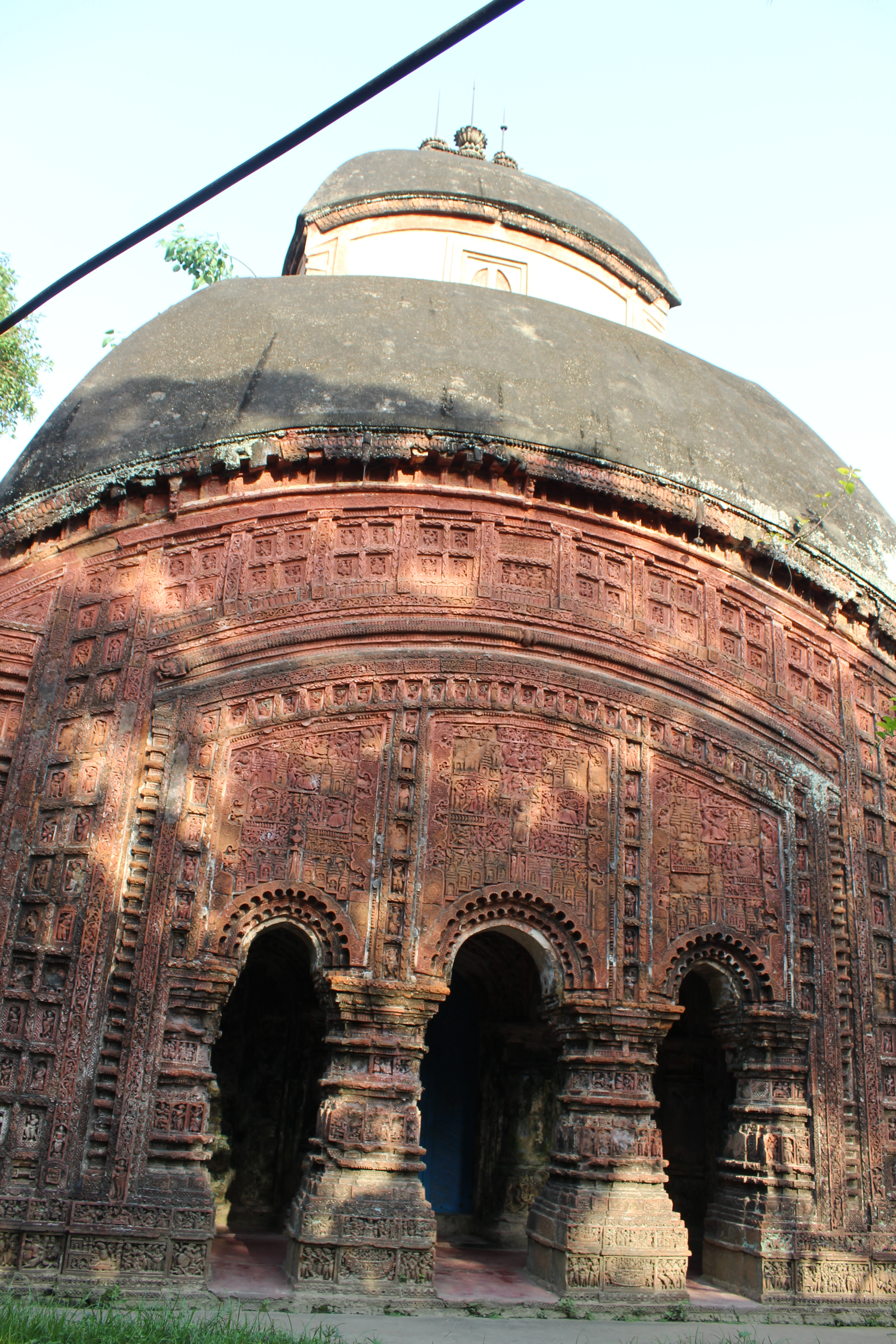
At chala Joychandi temple of China family, built in 1734

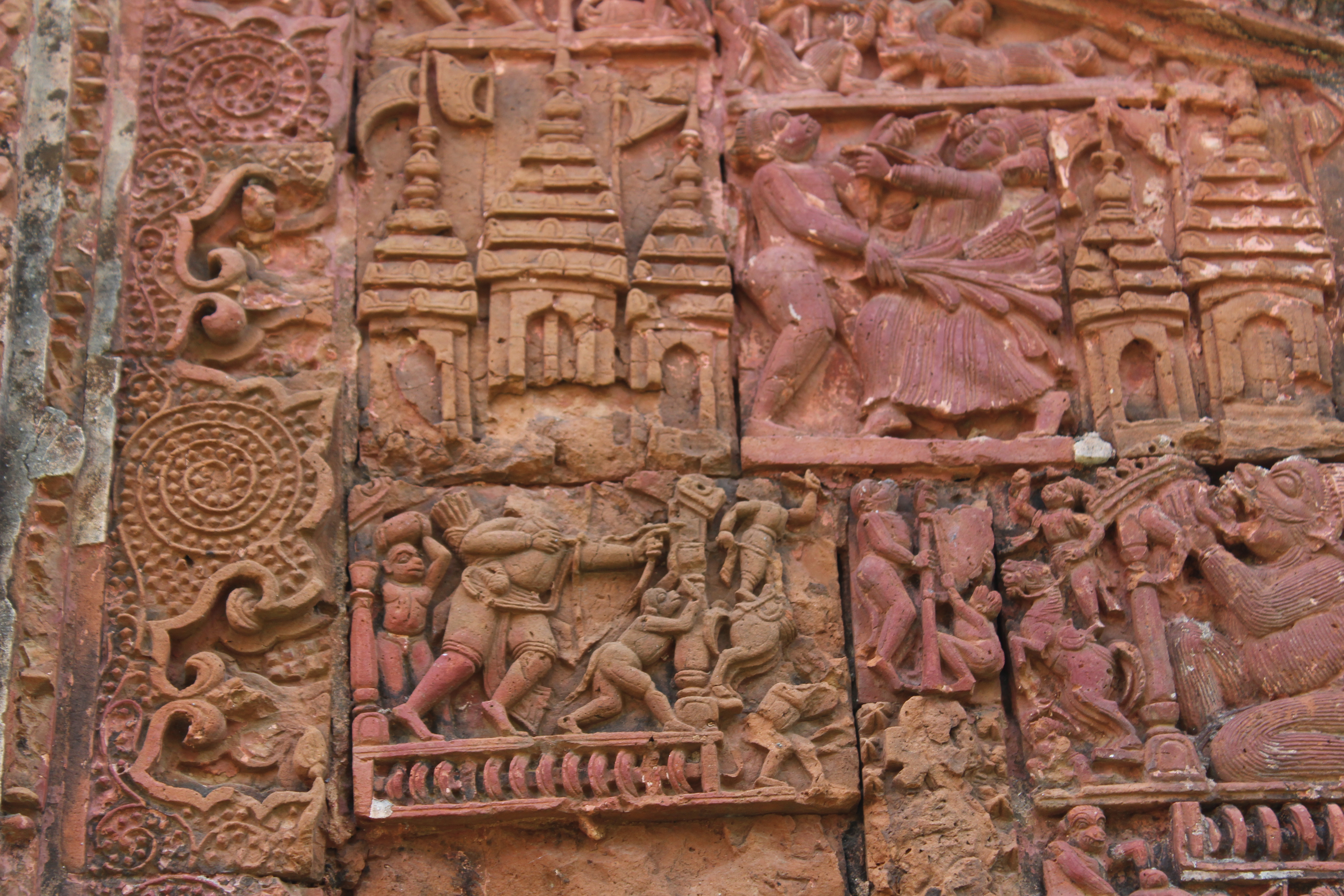
Terracotta panel in Joychandi temple

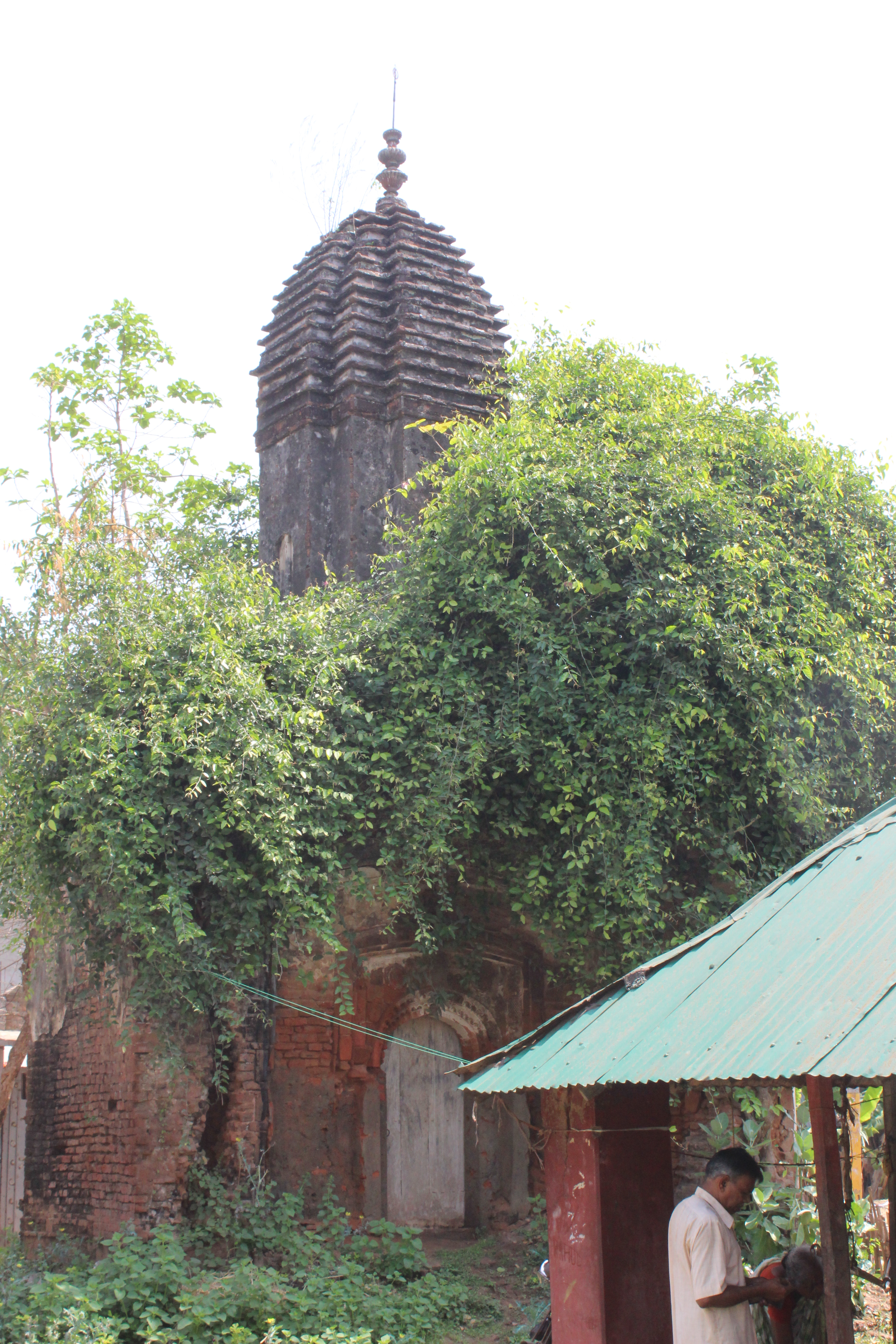
Dilapidated pancha ratna temple

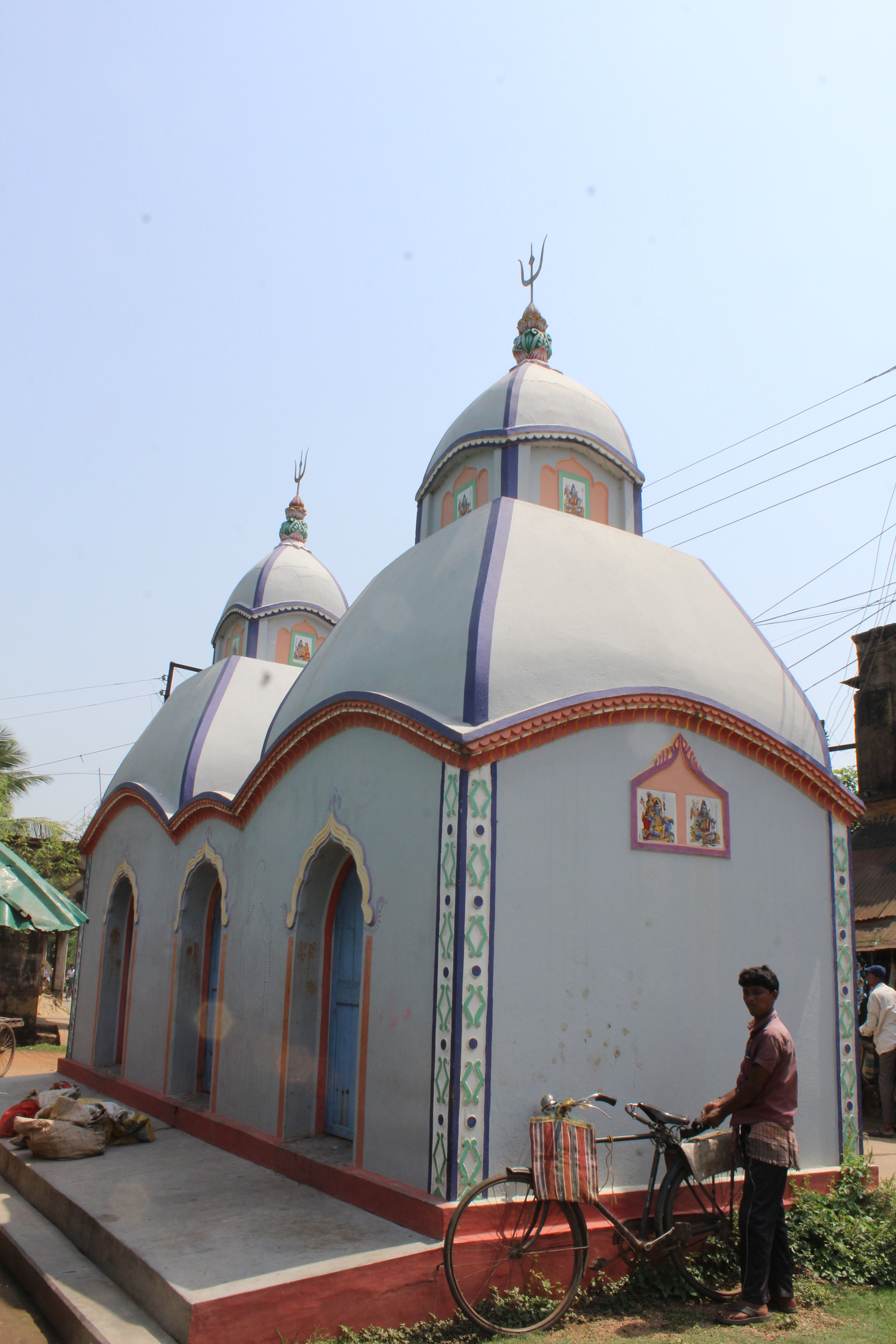
Jora Shiva temple

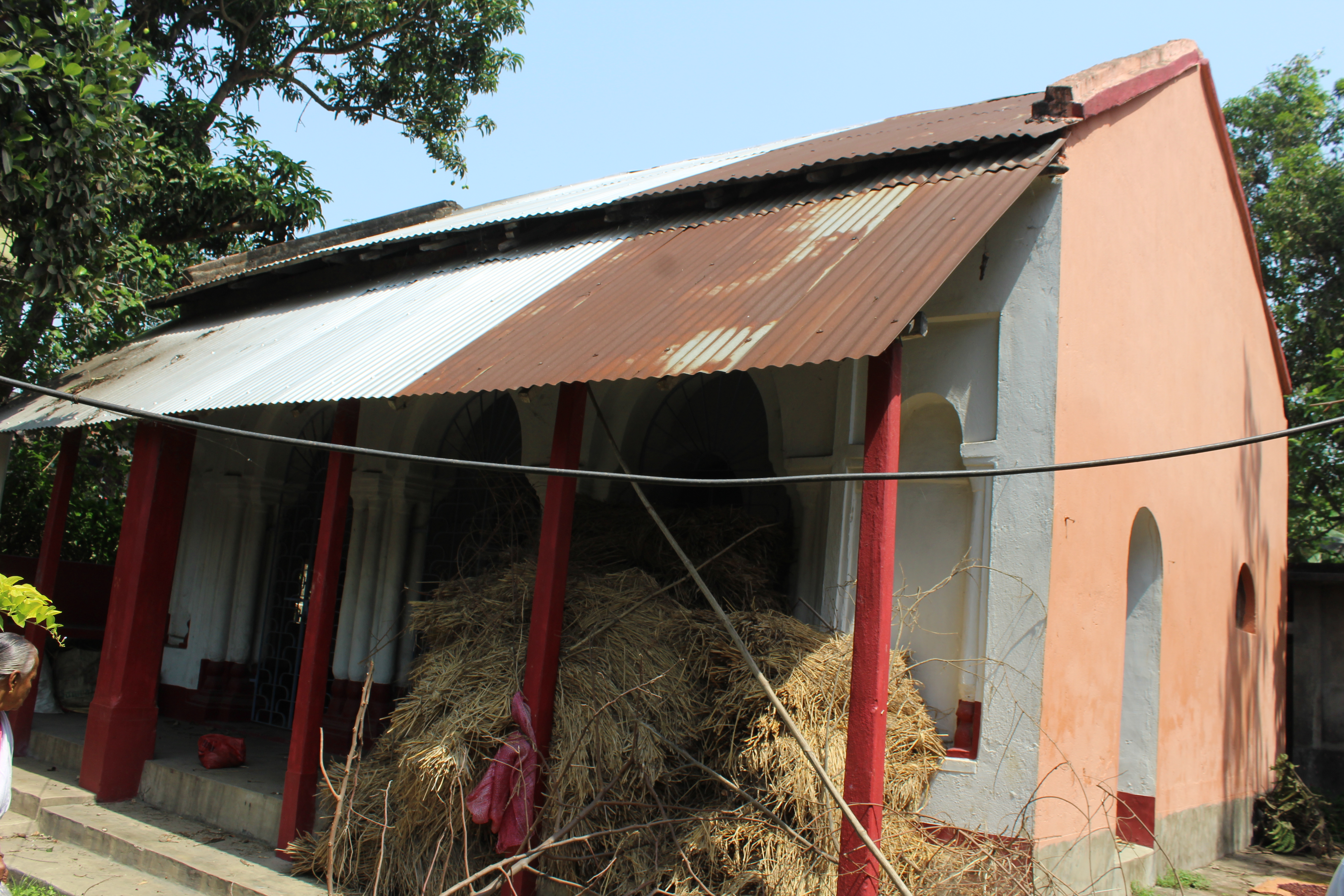
Durga dalan of the China family
