= Bhalia =

- Village
- Nickname: Vele
- Location in West Bengal, India Bhalia (India)
- Coordinates: 22.8963°N 87.8623°E
- Country: India
- State: West Bengal
- District: Hooghly

Population (2011)
  - Total: 2,452

Languages
  - Official: Bengali, English
- Time zone: UTC+5:30 (IST)
- PIN: 712615
- Telephone/STD code: 03211
- Lok Sabha constituency: Arambagh
- Vidhan Sabha constituency: Arambag
- Website: hooghly.gov.in

Bhalia is a village in the Arambagh CD block in the Arambagh subdivision of Hooghly district in the Indian state of West Bengal.

== Geography ==
Cities and towns in Arambagh subdivision in Hooghly district
M: municipal city/ town, R: rural/ urban centre, H: historical/ religious centre
Owing to space constraints in the small map, the actual locations in a larger map may vary slightly

=== Location ===
Bhalia is located at 22.8963°N 87.8623°E

=== Area overview ===
The Arambagh subdivision, presented in the map alongside, is divided into two physiographic parts – the Dwarakeswar River being the dividing line. The western part is upland and rocky – it is extension of the terrain of neighbouring Bankura district. The eastern part is flat alluvial plain area. The railways, the roads and flood-control measures have had an impact on the area. The area is overwhelmingly rural with 94.77% of the population living in rural areas and 5.23% in urban areas.

Note: The map alongside presents some of the notable locations in the subdivision. All places marked in the map are linked in the larger full-screen map.

== Demographics ==
According to the 2011 Census of India, Bhalia had a total population of 2,452 of which 1,241 (51%) were males and 1,211 (49%) were females. Population in the age range 0–6 years was 265. The total number of literate persons in Bhalia was 1,690 (77.27% of the population over 6 years).

== Culture ==
David J. McCutchion mentions the Raghunatha temple of Sarkar family as an at chala with porch on triple archway, built in 1772 and measuring 24’ x 23’.

== Bhalia picture gallery ==
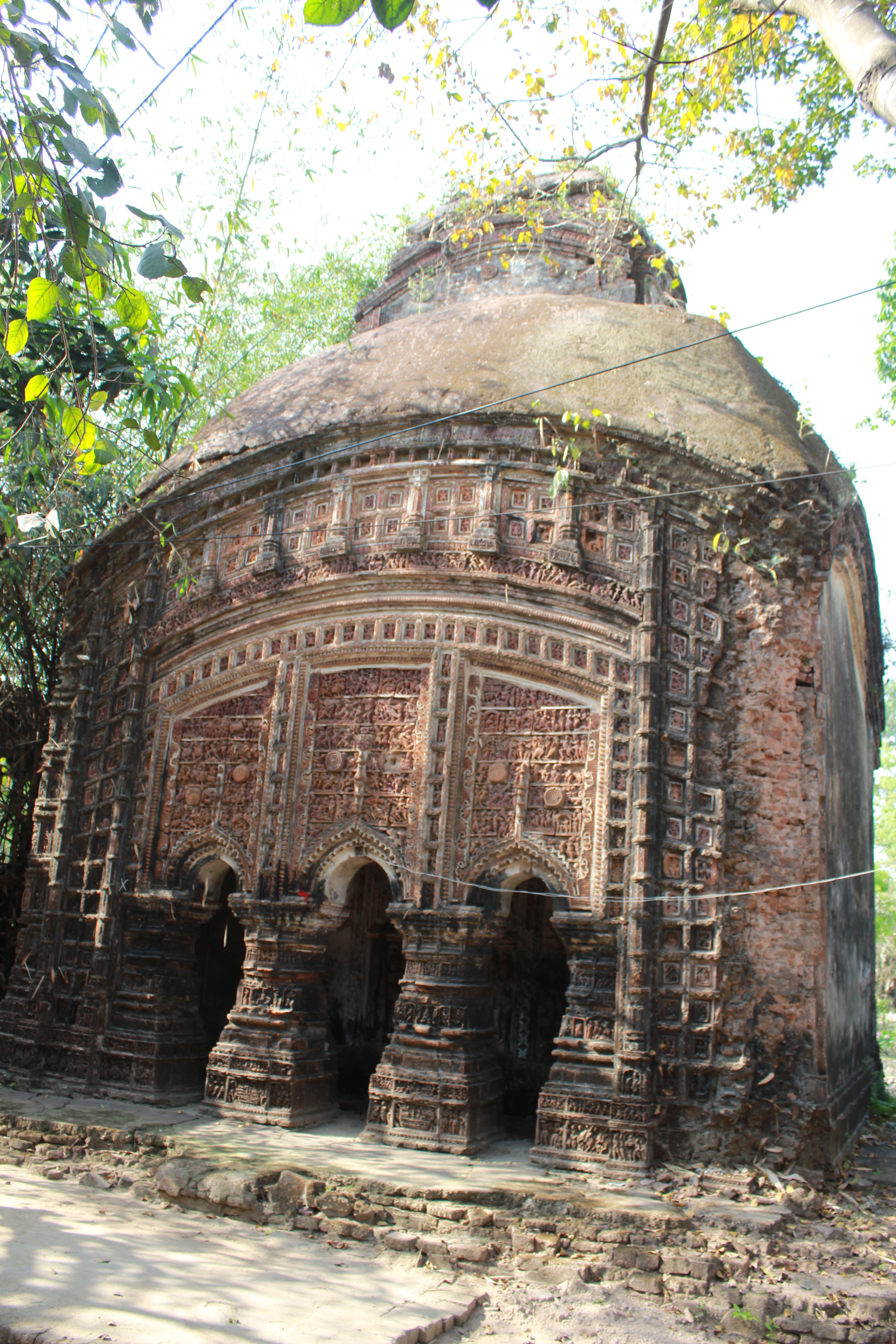
Raghunatha temple of Sarkar family, at chala, built in 1772

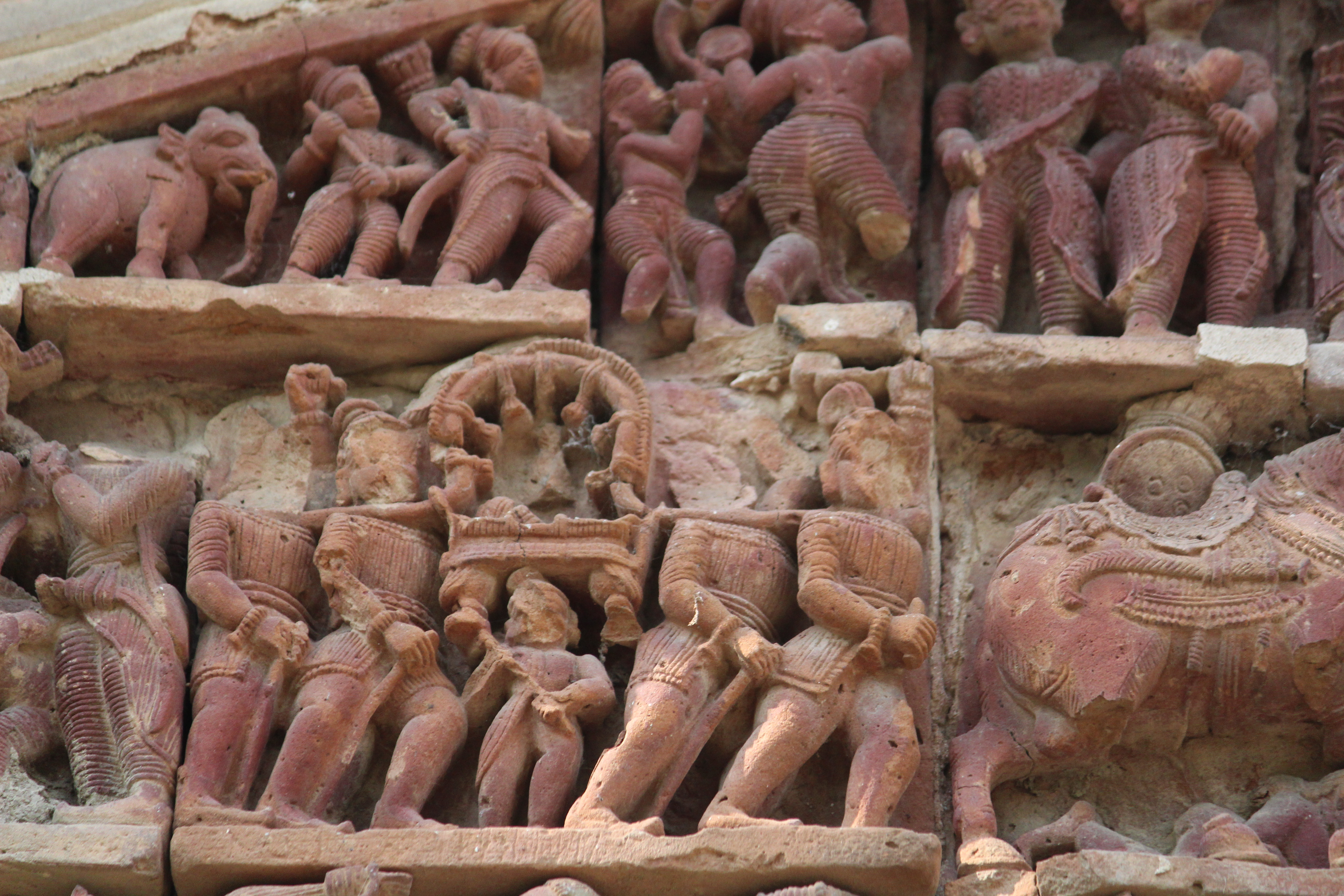
Terracotta relief in Raghunatha temple

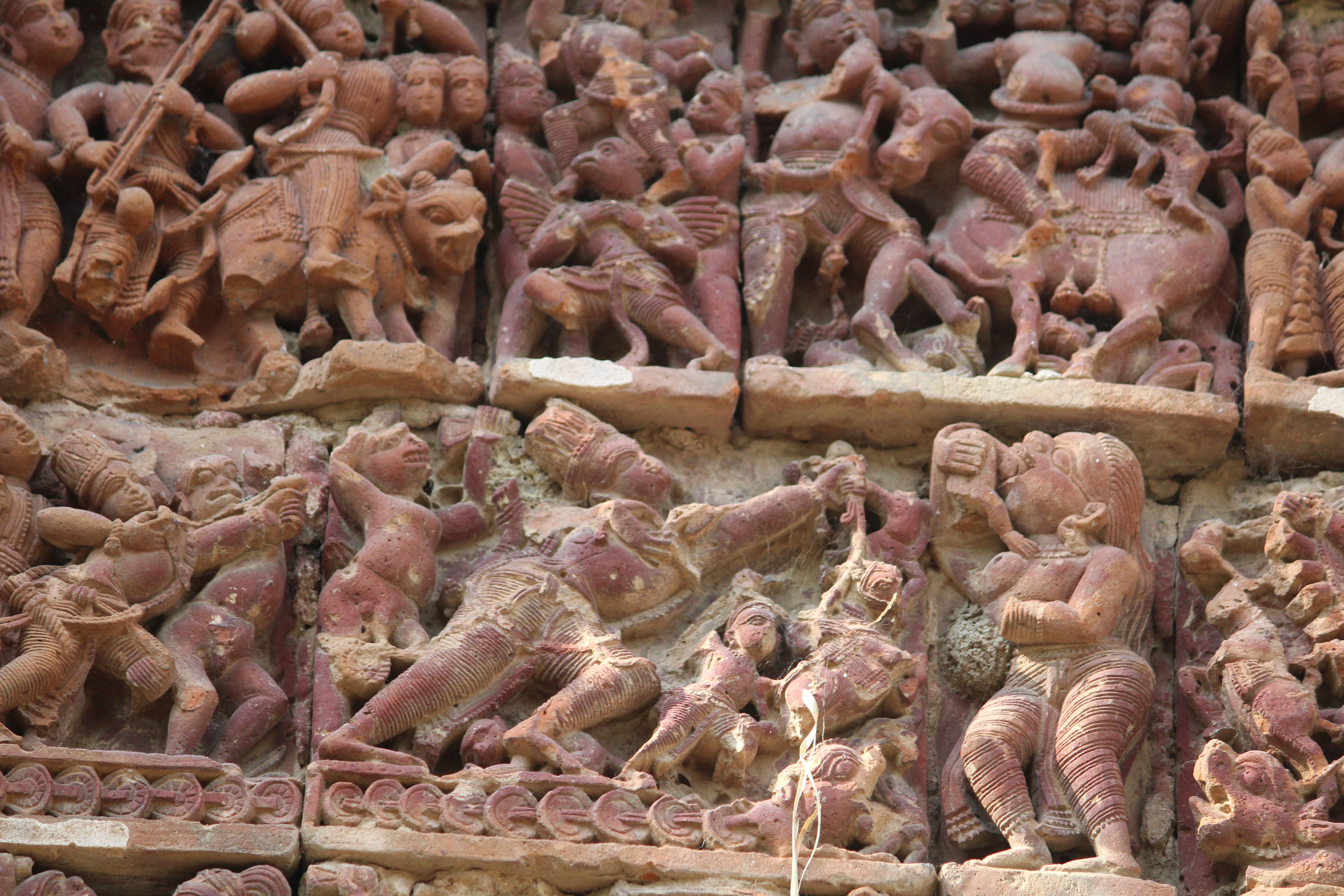
Terracotta relief in Raghunatha temple
