= 2023 Serampore violence =

A civil unrest in West Bengal, India

- Locations of key administrative points in Hooghly
- Location: 22°43′55″N 87°20′37″E; Rishra, Serampore, Hooghly district, West Bengal, India
- Date: April 2, 2023; 18:00 (IST (UTC+05:30))
- Attack type: Ram Navami riots, political violence, arson attack
- Injuries: 19
- Motive: Pre-planned criminal conspiracy Stopping the Ram Navami procession
- Accused: Shakir Ali (TMC leader) (arrested)

The 2023 Serampore violence refers to the communal clashes that occurred between two groups in the town of Rishra and Serampore towns of Hooghly district, West Bengal, India, on April 2 and April 3, 2023. The unrest, which initially broke out during a Ram Navami procession, involved stone-pelting, arson, and subsequent disruptions to local train services on the Howrah–Barddhaman main line. In response to the situation, the local administration clamped down by imposing prohibitory orders and suspending internet services across the affected areas, while the investigation into the clashes was subsequently handed over to the National Investigation Agency (NIA).

== Background ==
On 2 April 2023, during the Ram Navami celebration organized by Bharatiya Janata Party led by MP Dilip Ghosh in around towns of Rishra and Serampore of Hooghly district, West Bengal, India, at around 6:15 PM (IST), some clashes happened during the procession of the celebration.

Chronological Timeline of the Rishra Violence:-

- Outbreak of violence in GT Road (2 April 6:15 PM):-

A Ram Navami procession organized in the Rishra police station area faces tension near the Wellington Jute Mill crossing and Baro Masjid on Grand Trunk (GT) Road. Heated friction escalates into large-scale stone-pelting, vehicle torching, and vandalism. Multiple individuals—including police personnel and BJP MLA from Pursurah, Biman Ghosh.

- Administrative Protections Imposed (2 April 9:00 PM):-

The Chandannagar Police Commissionerate and Rapid Action Force (RAF) deploy to isolate the clashing groups. To contain the unrest, the district administration actively enforces prohibitory orders under Section 144 of the CrPC across Wards 1–5 of Rishra and Ward 24 of Serampore, while suspending mobile internet services across segments of the Hooghly district. Around 12 people are promptly arrested during the initial night sweep.

- Daytime Tensions & Political Standoff (3 April 9:00 AM):-

The town remains under heavy police guarding, though local markets are briefly permitted to operate under vigilance. Friction intensifies as on 3 April, state BJP President Sukanta Majumdar is barred by the state police from entering the troubled zone due to active Section 144 mandates at Konnagar. In protest, political party workers organize a three-hour promotional roadblock along the busy GT Road.

- Fresh Clashes & Train Disruptions (3 April 10:00 PM–10:30 PM):-

Fresh rioting breaks out near Rishra Railway Station (Gate Number 4). Mobs attack passing coaches and throw crude bombs near the tracks, forcing Eastern Railway to suspend all local and express train operations along the crucial Howrah–Barddhaman main line. Railway Protection Force (RPF) and state police drop tear gas shells to disperse the mob, and tracks are eventually cleared for traffic after 1:00 AM on April 4.

- High Court Directives & Stabilization (4 April):-

No new street violence is reported as town lanes remain heavily picketed by security forces and RAF route marches. Legally, a division bench of the Calcutta High Court intervenes, demanding the West Bengal state government file a comprehensive report regarding the fresh railway disruptions. Internet termination and Section 144 orders are kept active by the administration to preserve order.

== Reaction and aftermath ==
Soon after the violence broke out, Chief Minister of West Bengal, Mamata Banerjee ordered the police to take early actions and arrest all the people involved in the violence immediately. She also accused BJP of intentionally taking out rally only during Namaz period to make a chaos around the town. Following Banerjee's order, almost 50 people were arrested by the police.

On the other hand, from BJP side, the Leader of Opposition in West Bengal Legislative Assembly, Suvendu Adhikari blamed the mismanagement of Banerjee's administration on the violence and also demanded withdrawal of the suspension of the train services in Howrah-Barddhaman main line, along with deployment of CRPF personnels in the affected area.

Following the violence, the local Trinamool Congress MP from Serampore, Kalyan Banerjee visited the violence-affected localities of Rishra and Serampore and alleged that Bharatiya Janata Party National Vice-President and MP Dilip Ghosh provoked the people which began the violence. But Ghosh denied the allegation and said that local criminals from the neighbourhood areas of Konnagar, Rishra initiated the violence, which became wild after that.

On 4 April, Governor of West Bengal, C. V. Ananda Bose visited the affected areas of Rishra such as Rishra railway station, Rishra 4 No. Gate, Wellington Jute Mill and told the police officials for a strict investigation for this violence. While on the other hand, Adhikari and BJP blamed the Governor and demanded President's rule under Article 356 of Constitution of India in the state of West Bengal.

After the 2026 elections in West Bengal, the new BJP government under Adhikari, who became the Chief Minister took the charge in May 2026. Immediately after that, on 30 June 2026, NIA and West Bengal Police investigated and arrested Shakir Ali, TMC Leader who is also the Councillor of Rishra Municipality and husband of Aparupa Poddar, MP from Arambagh from his Rishra residence. A confrontation took place between the police and Aparupa Poddar, the former MP for Arambagh, in front of her residence. According to local residents, she obstructed a police vehicle to prevent the officers from taking away her husband, Shakir Ali. A heated argument ensued between Aparupa and the police, during which she struck the hand of a female constable. In response, the police have initiated a *suo motu* case at the Serampore police station, charging Aparupa with assaulting police personnel and obstructing public servants in the discharge of their duties. Following which, Poddar was called for interrogation to Serampore Police Station.

== See also ==
- 2022 Birbhum violence

Special Tag:possible formatting issues
