= Arup Dhara =

Indian politician

Member of the West Bengal Legislative Assembly
- In office 2 May 2021 – 4 May 2026
- Preceded by: Chhaya Dolai
- Succeeded by: Sukanta Dolui
- Constituency: Chandrakona

Personal details
- Party: AITC
- Profession: Politician

Arup Dhara is an Indian politician member of All India Trinamool Congress. He is an MLA, elected from the Chandrakona constituency in the 2021 West Bengal Legislative Assembly election.
