= Arambagh Lok Sabha constituency =

Lok Sabha Constituency in West Bengal

Coordinates: 22.9°N 87.8°E

Arambagh WB-29
- Lok Sabha constituency
- Interactive Map Outlining Arambagh Lok Sabha Constituency

Constituency details
- Country: India
- Region: East India
- State: West Bengal
- District: Hooghly & Paschim Medinipur
- Assembly constituencies: Haripal; Tarakeswar; Pursurah; Arambagh; Goghat; Khanakul; Chandrakona
- Established: 1967
- Total electors: 1,600,293
- Reservation: SC

Member of Parliament
- 18th Lok Sabha
- Incumbent Mitali Bag
- Party: NCPI
- Alliance: NDA
- Elected year: 2024

Arambagh Lok Sabha constituency is one of the 543 constituencies of the lower house of parliament in India. The constituency centres on the city of Arambagh in West Bengal. While six assembly segments of Arambagh Lok Sabha constituency are in Hooghly district, one segment is in Paschim Medinipur district. It was an open seat before 2009, but now it is reserved for scheduled castes. It was once known as the ' Red Fort ' (লালগড়) of CPI(M) for the party's long standing dominance over it for decades.

Most Successful parties from Arambagh Sabha
1. Communist Party of India (10times) (66.7%)
2. All India Trinamool Congress (3 times) (20.0%)
3. All India Forward Bloc (1 time) (6.66%)
4. "'Janata Party"' (1 time) (6.66%)

== Overview ==
1. Cooch Behar, 2. Alipurduars, 3. Jalpaiguri, 4. Darjeeling, 5. Raiganj, 6. Balurghat, 7. Maldaha Uttar, 8. Maldaha Dakshin, 9. Jangipur, 10. Baharampur, 11. Murshidabad, 12. Krishnanagar, 13. Ranaghat, 14. Bangaon, 15. Barrackpore, 16. Dum Dum, 17. Barasat, 18. Basirhat, 19. Jaynagar, 20. Mathurapur, 21. Diamond Harbour, 22. Jadavpur, 23. Kolkata Dakshin, 24. Kolkata Uttar, 25. Howrah, 26. Uluberia, 27. Serampore, 28. Hooghly, 29. Arambagh, 30. Tamluk, 31, Kanthi, 32. Ghatal, 33. Jhargram, 34. Medinipur, 35. Purulia, 36. Bankura, 37. Bishnupur, 38. Bardhaman Purba, 39. Bardhaman Durgapur, 40. Asansol, 41. Bolpur, 42. Birbhum

In the 2004 Lok Sabha polls Anil Basu of CPI(M) won the Arambagh seat by a margin of 592,502 votes, which remained for a long time the highest ever victory margin in Lok Sabha polls in the country.

== Assembly segments ==
As per order of the Delimitation Commission issued in 2006 in respect of the delimitation of constituencies in the West Bengal, parliamentary constituency No. 29 Arambag, reserved for Scheduled castes (SC), is composed of the following assembly segments:

#	Name	District	Member	Party	2024 Lead
196	Haripal	Arambagh	Madhumita Ghosh	BJP	AITC
198	Tarakeswar	Arambagh	Santu Pan	BJP	AITC
199	Pursurah	Arambagh	Biman Ghosh	BJP	BJP
200	Arambagh (SC)	Arambagh	Hemanta Bag	BJP	AITC
201	Goghat (SC)	Arambagh	Prasanta Digar	BJP	BJP
202	Khanakul	Arambagh	Susanta Ghosh	BJP	BJP
232	Chandrakona (SC)	Paschim Medinipur	Sukanta Dolui	BJP	AITC

Prior to delimitation, Arambagh Lok Sabha constituency was composed of the following assembly segments: Tarakeswar (assembly constituency no. 185), Pursurah (assembly constituency no. 192), Khanakul (SC) (assembly constituency no. 193), Arambagh (assembly constituency no. 194), Goghat (SC) (assembly constituency no. 195), Chandrakona (assembly constituency no. 196), Ghatal (SC) (assembly constituency no. 197)

== Members of Parliament ==
Year	Member	Party
1967	Amiyanath Bose	All India Forward Bloc
1971	Manoranjan Hazra	Communist Party of India (Marxist)
1977	Prafulla Chandra Sen	Janata Party
1980	Bijoy Krishna Modak	Communist Party of India (Marxist)
1984	Anil Basu	Communist Party of India (Marxist)
1989	Anil Basu	Communist Party of India (Marxist)
1991	Anil Basu	Communist Party of India (Marxist)
1996	Anil Basu	Communist Party of India (Marxist)
1998	Anil Basu	Communist Party of India (Marxist)
1999	Anil Basu	Communist Party of India (Marxist)
2004	Anil Basu	Communist Party of India (Marxist)
2009	Sakti Mohan Malik	Communist Party of India (Marxist)
2014	Aparupa Poddar	Trinamool Congress
2019	Aparupa Poddar	Trinamool Congress
2024	Mitali Bag	Trinamool Congress
2026 (Note: Switched to NCPI as part of AITC Rebels in Lok Sabha.)	Mitali Bag	Nationalist Citizens Party of India

== Election results ==
=== General election 2024 ===
2024 Indian general election: Arambagh
Party	Candidate	Votes	%	±%
AITC	Mitali Bag	712,587	45.71	▲1.57
BJP	Arup Kanti Digar	706,188	45.30	▲1.24
CPI(M)	Biplab Kumar Moitra	92,502	5.93	▼0.9
NOTA	None of the above	18,031	1.16	▼0.23
Majority		6,399	0.41	
Turnout		1,559,079	82.62	
AITC hold		Swing		

=== General election 2019 ===
2019 Indian general election: Arambagh
Party	Candidate	Votes	%	±%
AITC	Aparupa Poddar	649,929	44.14	−10.79
BJP	Tapan Kumar Roy	648,787	44.06	+32.45
CPI(M)	Sakti Mohan Malik	100,520	6.83	−22.68
INC	Jyoti Kumari Das	25,128	1.71	−0.33
NOTA	None of the above	20,495	1.39	
Majority		1,142	0.07	−25.39
Turnout		1,471,981	83.44	−1.67
Registered electors		1,764,726		
AITC hold		Swing	-21.62	

=== General election 2014 ===
2014 Indian general elections: Arambagh
Party	Candidate	Votes	%	±%
AITC	Aparupa Poddar (Afrin Ali)	7,48,764	54.94	New
CPI(M)	Sakti Mohan Malik	4,01,919	29.51	−25.29
BJP	Madhusudan Bag	1,58,480	11.63	+6.66
INC	Sambhu Nath Malik	27,872	2.04	−34.81
JDP	Ganesh Bag	7,062	0.51	−1.35
Majority		3,46,845	25.46	+8.14
Turnout		13,61,934	85.11	+0.53
AITC gain from CPI(M)		Swing	+42.64	

=== General election 2009 ===
2009 Indian general elections: Arambagh
Party	Candidate	Votes	%	±%
CPI(M)	Sakti Mohan Malik	6,30,454	54.63	−22.99
INC	Sambhu Nath Malik	4,28,696	36.85	+29.76
BJP	Murari Bera	57,903	4.97	−10.78
BSP	Parimal Biswas	24,762	2.12	N/A
JDP	Subir Kumar Majhi	21,722	1.86	N/A
Majority		2,01,558	17.78	−44.09
Turnout		11,63,337	84.58	+3.34
CPI(M) hold		Swing	-22.99	

=== General elections 1967-2009 ===
Most of the contests were multi-cornered. However, only winners and runners-up are mentioned below:

Year	Winner		Runner-up	
	Candidate	Party	Candidate	Party
1967	Amiyanath Bose	All India Forward Bloc	Sachin Choudhury	Indian National Congress
1971	Manoranjan Hazra	Communist Party of India (Marxist)	Santi Mohan Ray	Indian National Congress
1977	Prafulla Chandra Sen	Bharatiya Lok Dal	Santi Mohan Roy	Indian National Congress
1980	Bijoy Krishna Modak	Communist Party of India (Marxist)	Prafulla Chandra Sen	Janata Party
1984	Anil Basu	Communist Party of India (Marxist)	Gopal Das Nag	Indian National Congress
1989	Anil Basu	Communist Party of India (Marxist)	Sheikh Hasan Imam	Indian National Congress
1991	Anil Basu	Communist Party of India (Marxist)	Sheikh Hasan Imam	Indian National Congress
1996	Anil Basu	Communist Party of India (Marxist)	Monoranjan Hazra	Indian National Congress
1998	Anil Basu	Communist Party of India (Marxist)	Chunilal Chakraborty	Bharatiya Janata Party
1999	Anil Basu	Communist Party of India (Marxist)	Chunilal Chakraborty	Bharatiya Janata Party
2004	Anil Basu	Communist Party of India (Marxist)	Swapan Kumar Nandi	Bharatiya Janata Party

== See also ==
- List of constituencies of the Lok Sabha
