= Sukanta Dolui =

Indian politician (born 1985)

Member of the West Bengal Legislative Assembly
- Incumbent
- Assumed office 4 May 2026
- Preceded by: Arup Dhara
- Constituency: Chandrakona

Personal details
- Born: March 8, 1985 (age 41)
- Party: Bharatiya Janata Party
- Profession: Politician
- Website: https://www.amaderchandrakona.com

Sukanta Dolui (born 8 March;1985) is an Indian politician from West Bengal. He is a member of West Bengal Legislative Assembly from the Chandrakona Assembly constituency, which is reserved for Scheduled Caste community, in Paschim Medinipur district representing the Bharatiya Janata Party.

== Early life ==
Dolui is from Chandrakona, Paschim Medinipur district, West Bengal. He is the son of the late Chand Baran Dolui. He completed his BA at a college affiliated with Vidyasagar University, Midnapore, West Bengal, in 2009. He works as an attender in a West Bengal government aided school. He declared assets worth Rs.7 lakhs in his affidavit to the Election Commission of India. He had no cases registered against him.

== Career ==
Dolui won the Chandrakona Assembly constituency representing the Bharatiya Janata Party in the 2026 West Bengal Legislative Assembly election. He polled 1,40,517 votes and defeated his nearest rival, Surjya Kanta Doloi of the All India Trinamool Congress (AITC), by a margin of 33,481 votes.
