= Chhaya Dolai =

Indian politician

Chhaya Dolai (born 1983) is an Indian politician from West Bengal. She is a former member of the West Bengal Legislative Assembly from Chandrakona Assembly constituency, which is reserved for Scheduled Caste community, in Paschim Medinipur district. She won the 2016 West Bengal Legislative Assembly election representing the All India Trinamool Congress.

== Early life and education ==
Dolai is from Chandrakona, Paschim Medinipur district, West Bengal. She married Dilip Dolai, a farmer. She did her schooling at Khapur Gangche High School and passed the Class 12 examinations conducted by the West Bengal Board of Secondary Education.

== Career ==
Dolai won from Chandrakona Assembly constituency representing the All India Trinamool Congress in the 2016 West Bengal Legislative Assembly election. She polled 117,172 votes and defeated her nearest rival, Santinath Bodhuk of the Communist Party of India (Marxist), by a margin of 38,381 votes. Earlier, she first became an MLA winning the 2011 West Bengal Legislative Assembly election.
