= Arambagh Assembly constituency =

West Bengal Legislative Assembly constituency

Arambagh
- Constituency No. 200 for the West Bengal Legislative Assembly
- Interactive Map Outlining Arambagh Assembly Constituency

Constituency details
- Country: India
- Region: East India
- State: West Bengal
- District: Hooghly
- Lok Sabha constituency: Arambagh
- Established: 1951
- Total electors: 207,328
- Reservation: SC

Member of Legislative Assembly
- 18th West Bengal Legislative Assembly
- Incumbent Hemanta Bag
- Party: BJP
- Alliance: NDA
- Elected year: 2026

Arambagh Assembly constituency is an assembly constituency in Hooghly district in the Indian state of West Bengal. It is reserved for scheduled castes.

== Overview ==
As per orders of the Delimitation Commission, No. 200 Arambagh Assembly constituency (SC) is composed of the following: Arambagh municipality, and Arandi I, Arandi II, Batanal, Gaurhati I, Gaurhati II, Madhabpur, Mayapur I, Mayapur II, Salepur I, Salepur II and Tirol gram panchayats of Arambagh community development block.

Arambagh Assembly constituency (SC) is part of No. 29 Arambagh Lok Sabha constituency (SC).

== Members of the Legislative Assembly ==
Year	Name	Party
1951	Madan Mohan Saha	Communist Party of India
1951	Radha Krishna Pal	Independent politician
1957	Radha Krishna Pal	Indian National Congress
1962	Prafulla Chandra Sen (Arambagh East)	Indian National Congress
1962	Radha Krishna Pal (Arambagh West)	Indian National Congress
1967	Ajoy Kumar Mukherjee	Bangla Congress
1969	Prafulla Chandra Sen	Indian National Congress
1971	Prafulla Chandra Sen	Indian National Congress
1972	Prafulla Chandra Sen	Indian National Congress (Organisation)
1977	Ajoy Kumar Dey	Janata Party
1982	Abdul Mannan	Indian National Congress
1987	Benode Das	Communist Party of India (Marxist)
1991	Benode Das	Communist Party of India (Marxist)
1996	Binoy Dutta	Communist Party of India (Marxist)
2001	Binoy Dutta	Communist Party of India (Marxist)
2006	Binoy Dutta	Communist Party of India (Marxist)
2011	Krishna Chandra Santra	Trinamool Congress
2016	Krishna Chandra Santra	Trinamool Congress
2021	Madhusudan Bag	Bharatiya Janata Party
2026	Hemanta Bag	Bharatiya Janata Party

== Election results ==
=== 2026 ===
2026 West Bengal Legislative Assembly election: Arambagh
Party	Candidate	Votes	%	±%
BJP	Hemanta Bag	123,000	52.15	▲5.27
AITC	Mita Bag	94,041	39.87	▼3.75
CPI(M)	Bithika Pandit	11,414	4.84	▼1.96
INC	Sushil Santra	2,296	0.97	New entry
NOTA	None of the above	1,606	0.68	▼0.76
Majority		28,959	12.28	▲9.02
Turnout		235,875	93.04	▲7.66
BJP hold		Swing		

=== 2021 ===
2021 West Bengal Legislative Assembly election: Arambagh
Party	Candidate	Votes	%	±%
BJP	Madhusudan Bag	103,108	46.88	▲38.24
AITC	Sujata Mondal	95,936	43.62	▼10.25
CPI(M)	Sakti Mohan Malik	14,965	6.8	▼28.81
NOTA	None of the above	3,171	1.44	▼0.44
Majority		7,172	3.26	▼15.00
Turnout		219,960	85.38	▼0.42
BJP gain from AITC		Swing		

=== 2016 ===
2016 West Bengal Legislative Assembly election: Arambagh
Party	Candidate	Votes	%	±%
AITC	Krishna Chandra Santra	107,579	53.87	▲0.50
CPI(M)	Asit Kumar Malik	71,122	35.61	▼7.11
BJP	Murari Bera	17,261	8.64	▲4.72
NOTA	None of the Above	3,748	1.88	New entry
Majority		36,457	18.26	▲7.61
Turnout		1,99,710	85.80	▼2.57
AITC hold		Swing		

=== 2011 ===
2011 West Bengal Legislative Assembly election: Arambagh
Party	Candidate	Votes	%	±%
AITC	Krishna Chandra Santra	98,011	53.37	▲23.26
CPI(M)	Asit Kumar Malik	78,448	42.72	▼19.54
BJP	Sukumar Santra	7,194	3.92	New entry
Majority		19,563	10.65	▼21.50
Turnout		1,83,653	88.37	▲2.97
AITC gain from CPI(M)		Swing		

=== 2006 ===
2006 West Bengal Legislative Assembly election: Arambagh
Party	Candidate	Votes	%	±%
CPI(M)	Binoy Dutta	104,067	62.26	▼16.69
AITC	Bivabindu Nandi	50,324	30.11	▲13.40
INC	Sufal Jana	12,757	7.63	New entry
Majority		53,743	32.15	▼30.09
Turnout		1,67,148	85.40	▲3.26
CPI(M) hold		Swing		

=== 2001 ===
2001 West Bengal Legislative Assembly election: Arambagh
Party	Candidate	Votes	%	±%
CPI(M)	Binoy Dutta	127,439	78.95	▲16.52
AITC	Sheikh Hasan Imam	26,963	16.71	New entry
BJP	Asit Kumar Kundu	7,010	4.34	▼0.56
Majority		1,00,466	62.24	▲32.29
Turnout		1,61,402	82.14	▼2.64
CPI(M) hold		Swing		

=== 1996 ===
1996 West Bengal Legislative Assembly election: Arambagh
Party	Candidate	Votes	%	±%
CPI(M)	Binoy Dutta	91,939	62.43	▲6.41
INC	Abdus Sukur	47,839	32.48	▼6.91
BJP	Anath Bandhu Dey	7,220	4.90	▲1.24
Independent	Sadananda Pal	274	0.19	New entry
Majority		44,100	29.95	▲13.32
Turnout		1,47,272	84.78	▲3.63
CPI(M) hold		Swing		

=== 1991 ===
1991 West Bengal Legislative Assembly election: Arambagh
Party	Candidate	Votes	%	±%
CPI(M)	Benode Das	71,681	56.02	▲1.27
INC	Jalim Singha Roy	50,404	39.39	▼4.15
BJP	Prafulla Kumar Mukherjee	4,688	3.66	▲2.53
Independent	Sourish Ghosh	1,181	0.92	New entry
Majority		21,277	16.63	▲5.42
Turnout		1,27,954	81.15	▼1.20
CPI(M) hold		Swing		

=== 1987 ===
1987 West Bengal Legislative Assembly election: Arambagh
Party	Candidate	Votes	%	±%
CPI(M)	Benode Das	60,097	54.80	New entry
INC	Abdul Mannan	47,799	43.54	▼4.53
BJP	Madan Haider	1,244	1.13	New entry
Independent	Sheikh Mohammad Jikria	326	0.30	New entry
Independent	Nikunja Jana	308	0.28	New entry
Majority		12,298	11.21	▲8.17
Turnout		1,09,774	82.35	▲4.81
CPI(M) gain from INC		Swing		

=== 1982 ===
1982 West Bengal Legislative Assembly election: Arambagh
Party	Candidate	Votes	%	±%
INC	Abdul Mannan	42,668	48.07	▲32.50
Independent	Ranjit Chakarborty	39,925	44.98	New entry
JP	Ajoy Kumar Dey	6,174	6.96	▼50.78
Majority		2,743	3.09	▼28.95
Turnout		88,767	77.54	▲19.19
INC gain from JP		Swing		

=== 1977 ===
1977 West Bengal Legislative Assembly election: Arambagh
Party	Candidate	Votes	%	±%
JP	Ajoy Kumar Dey	31,304	57.74	
CPI(M)	Madan Mohan Saha	13,935	25.70	
INC	Abdul Mannan	8,440	15.57	
Independent	Sheikh Shahabuddin Ahmed	539	0.99	
Majority		17,369	32.04	
Turnout		54,218	58.35	
JP gain from INC		Swing		

=== 1951-1972 ===
Prafulla Chandra Sen won the Arambagh seat in 1972, 1971 and 1969. In a historic contest in 1967 Prafulla Chandra Sen, then the Congress Chief Minister, lost the Arambagh seat to Ajay Kumar Mukherjee of Bangla Congress, who became the new Chief Minister, in the first United Front government in the state. The main factor of Sen's defeat was student agitation there. Students under the leadership of Narayan Ch Ghosh had organised farmers, poor people and the middle class against Sen. In 1962 Arambagh had two seats. Prafulla Chandra Sen of Congress won the Arambagh East seat and Radha Krishna Pal of Congress won the Arambagh West seat. In 1957 Radha Krishna Pal of Congress won the Arambagh seat. In independent India's first general election in 1951, Arambagh had twin seats. These were won by Madan Mohan Saha of CPI and Radha Krishna Pal, Independent.
