= Amiya Nath Bose =

Indian politician (1915–1996)

Member of Parliament, Lok Sabha
- In office 1967-1971
- Preceded by: constituency established
- Succeeded by: Manoranjan Hazra
- Constituency: Arambagh, West Bengal

Personal details
- Born: 20 November 1915 Calcutta, Bengal Presidency, British India
- Died: 27 January 1996 (aged 80)
- Party: Forward Bloc
- Spouse: Jyotsna Bose

Amiya Nath Bose (20 November 1915 – 27 January 1996) was an Indian politician. He was elected to the Lok Sabha, lower house of the Parliament of India from Arambagh in West Bengal as a member of the Forward Bloc.

== Life ==
Amiya Nath Bose was the son of the independence activist Sarat Chandra Bose and Vibhabati Devi. His uncle was Subhas Chandra Bose, founder of the All India Forward Bloc. In 1937 he started studying economics at Cambridge University, where he gained a second-class BA, and he was called to the Bar in 1941. He was kept under government surveillance, suspected of radical anti-imperialism. In 1942 he helped found the Committee of Indian Congressmen (CIC), becoming General Secretary. However, his rumoured pro-Axis leanings led to internal conflict in the party. In 1944 he moved to Birmingham to escape the bombings, and helped organize the Indian Political Conference in Birmingham in 1944.
