= Manoranjan Hazra =

Indian politician

Member of Parliament, Lok Sabha
- In office 1971-1977
- Preceded by: Amiya Nath Bose
- Succeeded by: Prafulla Chandra Sen
- Constituency: Arambagh, West Bengal

Member of Legislative Assembly
- In office 1977–1982
- Preceded by: Mahadeb Mukhopadhyay
- Succeeded by: Santi Mohan Roy
- Constituency: Pursurah, Hooghly, West Bengal

Member of Legislative Assembly
- In office 1952–1971
- Preceded by: New Seat
- Succeeded by: Santasri Chatterjee
- Constituency: Uttarpara, Hooghly, West Bengal

Personal details
- Born: 13 March 1920 Chatra, Serampore, Hooghly district, Bengal Presidency, British India
- Died: Unknown
- Party: Indian National Congress (1991- ?) Communist Party of India (Marxist) (1967-1987) Communist Party of India (1947-1964)
- Spouse: Shankari Hazra

Manoranjan Hazra was an Indian politician. He was elected to the Lok Sabha, lower house of the Parliament of India from Arambagh in West Bengal as a member of the Communist Party of India (Marxist).
