= Anil Basu =

Indian politician (1946–2018)

Member of the Indian Parliament for Arambagh
- In office 1984-2009
- Preceded by: Bijoy Krishna Modak
- Succeeded by: Sakti Mohan Malik

Personal details
- Born: 7 November 1946 Hooghly, West Bengal
- Died: 2 October 2018 Kolkata
- Party: CPI(M)
- Spouse: Sabita Basu
- Children: 1 son and 1 daughter
- As of 17 September, 2006

Anil Basu (Bengali: অনিল বসু) (7 November 1946 - 2 October 2018) was an Indian politician and a former member of the Communist Party of India (Marxist) political party.

He joined the Students Wing of the CPI(M) in 1966 during the Food Movement. He joined the Chinsurah Local Committee of the CPI(M) in 1967 and became the DYFI Zonal Secretary in 1970. Local Committee Secretary in 1971. Member of Zonal Committee in 1974. Zonal Committee Secretary in 1981 and admitted into the District Committee. Elected for the first time to the 8th Lok Sabha in 1984 from Arambagh constituency in West Bengal. He was re-elected to the Lok Sabha in 1989, 1991, 1996, 1998, 1999 and 2004 from the same constituency. He was directly involved in the Sainbari murder. He was caught making derogatory remarks about Mamata Banerjee and for this he was severely criticised by his own party men. In 2012, he was expelled from the Communist Party of India (Marxist) on charge of nepotism, anti-party activities & breach of discipline.

== Highest victory margin ==
In the 2004 Lok Sabha polls, he won the Arambagh seat by a margin of 592,502 votes, which was the highest ever victory margin in Lok Sabha polls in the country till it was broken by Pritam Munde of the BJP with a new record margin of 696,321 votes from Beed in Maharashtra.But as It was In the bypoll, so it did not count as the highest margin. BJP leader CR Patil won from Navsari seat of Gujarat by 6.89 lakh votes

== Controversies ==
Basu was alleged to be linked to the Sainbari murder case where 3 brothers of the Sain family were brutally murdered, their home set on fire, an infant thrown into the fire and the family members thoroughly traumatized. The other names linked to this murder were those of Benoy Krishna Konar, Nirupam Sen and Amal Halder, all senior CPI(M) leaders. The Sain family has not received justice to date.
