= Bijoy Krishna Modak =

Indian politician

Member of Parliament, Lok Sabha
- In office 1967–1980
- Preceded by: Provat Kar
- Succeeded by: Rupchand Pal
- Constituency: Hooghly, West Bengal
- In office 1980–1984
- Preceded by: Prafulla Chandra Sen
- Succeeded by: Anil Basu
- Constituency: Arambagh, West Bengal

Member of West Bengal Legislative Assembly
- In office 1957–1962
- Preceded by: Brindaban Chattopadhyay
- Succeeded by: Brindaban Chattopadhyay
- Constituency: Balagarh

Personal details
- Born: 27 June 1906 Hooghly district, Bengal Presidency, British India
- Died: 9 May 1994 (aged 87)
- Party: Communist Party of India (Marxist)
- Other political affiliations: Communist Party of India

Bijoy Krishna Modak (1906–1994) was an Indian politician. He was elected to the Lok Sabha, lower house of the Parliament of India from Hooghly and Arambagh in West Bengal as a member of the Communist Party of India (Marxist).
