= Chandrakona Jirat High School =

Location
- Chandrakona-II, Chandrakona, West Bengal; India; 22°44′05.11″N 87°31′03.66″E

Information
- Type: School
- Established: 1856
- School district: Paschim Medinipur

Chandrakona Jirat High School is an educational institution situated at Gobindapur village, Chandrakona of Paschim Medinipur, West Bengal, India.

== History ==
The school was founded by the late Zamindar Jaykrishna Mukhopadhyay and is the second oldest institution of the district. Pandit Iswar chandra Vidyasagar visited this school in 1854. With his recommendation, the school was affiliated as a Middle English school in 1856 and was upgraded to an H.E. school in 1871. The School also upgraded as old H.S. school on 1 January 1963 and new H.S. School with General Stream Course since 1977. Class V to X are only boys and XI and XII are co-educational.
