= Binoy Dutta =

Indian politician (1945–2020)

West Bengal Legislative Assembly
- In office 1996–2011
- Preceded by: Benode Das
- Succeeded by: Krishna Chandra Santra
- Constituency: Arambag

Personal details
- Born: 11 April 1945
- Died: 22 February 2020 (aged 74)
- Political party: Communist Party of India (Marxist)

Binoy Dutta (11 April 1945 – 22 February 2020) was an Indian politician from West Bengal belonging to Communist Party of India (Marxist). He was elected thrice as a member of the West Bengal Legislative Assembly.

== Biography ==
Dutta was elected as a member of the West Bengal Legislative Assembly from Arambag in 1996. He was also elected from that constituency in 2001 and 2006.

Dutta died on 22 February 2020 at the age of 75.
