= Krishna Chandra Santra =

Indian politician

Member of West Bengal Legislative Assembly
- In office 2011–2021
- Preceded by: Binoy Dutta
- Succeeded by: Madhusudan Bag
- Constituency: Arambag

Personal details
- Party: All India Trinamool Congress
- Education: University of Burdwan

Krishna Chandra Santra is an Indian academic and politician from West Bengal belonging to All India Trinamool Congress. He is a member of the West Bengal Legislative Assembly.

He graduated from University of Burdwan in 1974. He was elected as a member of the West Bengal Legislative Assembly from Arambag in 2011 and 2016.

State Legislative Assembly
Preceded by Binoy Dutta (CPI-M)	Member of the West Bengal Legislative Assembly from Arambag Assembly constituency 2011–	Incumbent
