= Prafulla Chandra Sen =

Chief Minister of West Bengal from 1962 to 1967

2nd Chief Minister of West Bengal
- In office 2 July 1962 (Note: Includes 6 days served as acting chief minister from 2 to 8 July 1962.) – 28 February 1967
- Governor: Padmaja Naidu
- Cabinet: Sen
- Preceded by: Bidhan Chandra Roy
- Succeeded by: Ajoy Mukherjee

Member of Parliament, Lok Sabha
- In office 1977–1980
- Preceded by: Manoranjan Hazra
- Succeeded by: Bijoy Krishna Modak
- Constituency: Arambagh

Member of the West Bengal Legislative Assembly
- In office 1957–1962
- Preceded by: Constituency established
- Succeeded by: Krishna Pada Pandit
- Constituency: Khanakul
- In office 1962–1967
- Preceded by: Constituency established
- Succeeded by: Constituency abolished
- Constituency: Arambagh East
- In office 1969–1977
- Preceded by: Ajoy Kumar Mukherjee
- Succeeded by: Ajoy Kumar Dey
- Constituency: Arambagh

Personal details
- Born: 10 April 1897 Senhati Khulna, Bangladesh, Bengal Presidency, British India
- Died: 25 September 1990 (aged 93) Calcutta, West Bengal, India
- Party: Janata Party
- Other political affiliations: Indian National Congress (until 1969); Indian National Congress (Organisation) (1969–1977)
- Education: University of Calcutta

Prafulla Chandra Sen (10 April 1897 – 25 September 1990) was an Indian politician and independence activist who was Chief Minister of West Bengal from 1962 to 1967.

== Background ==
Prafulla Chandra Sen was born in the village Senhati in the Khulna, Bengal on 10 April 1897 in a Kayastha family. Most of his childhood was spent in Bihar, Eastern India. He started his education in Bihar and passed the entrance exam to attend the R. Mitra Institute in Deoghar. He then went on to receive a Bachelor of Science degree from Scottish Church College in Calcutta. After graduating, he joined an accounting firm and aspired to move to England in order to become an articled clerk. His ambitions changed upon hearing Mahatma Gandhi's speech at the Calcutta session of the Congress Party in 1920.

Influenced by Gandhi's speech, Sen abandoned his plans of studying abroad and rallied to Gandhi's call for a mass non-cooperation movement against the British. In 1923, Sen shifted to the area of Arambagh in the Hooghly District, which became his laboratory for Gandhian experiments on Swadeshi and Satyagraha.

== Political career ==
=== Colonial era ===
Sen was an activist for Indian independence, supporting the Indian National Congress, and was committed to Gandhi's philosophy of grass-roots democracy and a self-reliant rural economy. Gandhi's influence on Sen was so pervasive that, in the 1920s, he shifted his area of social and political activity to Arambagh, an under-developed and malaria-infested area of West Bengal and worked ceaselessly for its betterment. For his efforts, Sen earned the sobriquet "Gandhi of Arambagh". He was thought to have been encouraged by the then president of the union and the noted academic (headmaster of Arambagh High School) Nagendranath Chatterjee, whom he defeated in a poll, but they never lost mutual admiration. It is reported that Sen offered a pranam to Chatterjee every time they met, long after he became a national figure.

Sen spent over ten years in various jails between 1930 and 1942 for anti-British activities. During that time period, the Congress Party office at Serampore was his home and he earned virtually nothing, simply possessing one home-spun dhoti (sarong) and kurta. In the partial exercise of democracy permitted by the British in the 1940s, Sen was elected to the Bengal Assembly from Arambagh in 1944 and was deputy leader of the opposition.

=== After independence ===
In 1948, he was inducted by Chief Minister Bidhan Chandra Roy into the West Bengal Cabinet as Minister of Agriculture. This was a portfolio he held until 1967. He also functioned as Roy's Deputy Minister and was acknowledged as his political heir.

After Roy's death in 1962, Sen became West Bengal's third Chief Minister. Three years later, his regime faced a drastic food shortage in the state following a countrywide drought. At a Food Ministers' conference in Delhi, Sen advocated introducing the politically unsound measure of food rationing in urban areas. Within months, he had introduced food-grain rationing in the state, a system which has continued with minor modifications to this date.

To build food stocks, he imposed a heavy levy on rice mills. In the process, he alienated the business community. Shortages of essentials led to anti-Congress Party strikes. This was followed by violence and police excesses which further isolated Sen's government. In 1967, the Congress lost the West Bengal election to the Marxists with Sen losing his Arambagh seat in the West Bengal Legislative Assembly as well.

After this setback, Sen, although re-elected to the West Bengal Assembly, never recovered high political office. In the 1980s he fruitlessly espoused the cause of partyless democracy and, although he had left the Congress (I), having little sympathy for its leaders, came around to publicly supporting the party at public forums.

== Political legacy ==
Sen was strongly opposed to Marxists. His own brother Manindra Nath Sengupta was an undivided Communist Party leader from South Kolkata. Even during the period of Sengupta's serious life-threatening illness, his family requested Sen to provide some free healthcare facility in government hospitals to save Sengupta's life, as his family did not have money for a health check-up. Sengupta was himself a renowned homeopath at that point in time. He also distributed all his earnings to the poor and offered health care for free to the poor and needy people of Kolkata. No special favors were offered by Sen but only a written letter for an ordinary general free bed in MLA quota if vacant with the medical college in Kolkata was provided to Sengupta's family. When the above came to Sengupta's knowledge, he refused to take admission to medical college for any treatment.

Sen helped to transform the Congress Party in Bengal from an anti-imperialist unit into one capable of winning elections and offering capable governance. When the Indian National Congress was split in the 1969 by the then Prime Minister Indira Gandhi, its more powerful faction took the name of its benefactor and was called the Congress (R), whilst the less powerful faction, the one that Sen joined, was called the Congress (O), which later merged into the Janata Party.

By the 1980s the latter had virtually disappeared. Although disillusioned with the state of the Congress (Indira) party, he remained an optimist to the end. One of his last acts, a fortnight before he died, was to participate, sitting in a wheelchair, in a Congress (I)-sponsored march in Calcutta to protest against the state's CPI(M)-led government.

In 1967, he was defeated at Arambagh by another Gandhian, Ajoy Mukherjee, who became Chief Minister of West Bengal. The architect of Ajoy Mukherjee's victory at Arambagh was Narayan Ch Ghosh, the then student leader. Attending Sen's birth centenary, Ghosh (then a professor) said, 'We have to learn from Prafulla Chandra Sen's life. How a man of Senhati became the Gandhi of Arambagh is really amazing. Sens' conviction toward the society is a lesson for all of us..."

To his last, he remained a bachelor with an undemanding lifestyle. He passionately championed the upliftment of village industry including home-spun cloth or khadi. For most of his later life, Sen wore only khadi and a week before he died, sold khadi from a newly opened shop to inaugurate its sale.

He died in Calcutta on 25 September 1990.

According to The Independent dated 28 September 1990, Sen was "a fiery freedom fighter from Bengal state in Eastern India and later the state's Chief Minister practiced a selfless and principled brand of politics long forgotten in India today".

== Notes ==
Political offices
Preceded by President's Rule	Chief Minister of West Bengal; 1962—1967	Succeeded by Ajoy Kumar Mukherjee
