= Chandrakona Assembly constituency =

Chandrakona
- Constituency No. 232 for the West Bengal Legislative Assembly
- Interactive Map Outlining Chandrakona Assembly Constituency

Constituency details
- Country: India
- Region: East India
- State: West Bengal
- District: Paschim Medinipur
- Lok Sabha constituency: Arambagh
- Established: 1962
- Total electors: 216,307
- Reservation: SC

Member of Legislative Assembly
- 18th West Bengal Legislative Assembly
- Incumbent Sukanta Dolui
- Party: BJP
- Alliance: NDA
- Elected year: 2026
- Preceded by: Arup Dhara

Chandrakona Assembly constituency is an assembly constituency in Ghatal, Paschim Medinipur district in the Indian state of West Bengal. It is reserved for scheduled castes.

== Overview ==
As per orders of the Delimitation Commission, No. 232 Chandrakona Assembly constituency (SC) is composed of the following: Chandrakona municipality, Chandrakona I & II community development blocks, Ramjibanpur municipality, Khirpai municipality, and Niz Narajol gram panchayat of Daspur I community development block.

Chadrakona Assembly constituency (SC) is part of No. 29 Arambagh Lok Sabha constituency (SC).

== Members of the Legislative Assembly ==
Year	Name	Party
1962	Indrajit Roy	Indian National Congress
1967	Indrajit Roy	Indian National Congress
1969	Soroshi Choudhury	Communist Party of India
1971	Soroshi Choudhury	Communist Party of India
1972	Satya Ghoshal	Communist Party of India
1977	Umapati Chakraborty	Communist Party of India
1982	Umapati Chakraborty	Communist Party of India
1987	Umapati Chakraborty	Communist Party of India
1991	Umapati Chakraborty	Communist Party of India
1996	Gurupada Dutta	Communist Party of India
2001	Gurupada Dutta	Communist Party of India
2006	Gurupada Dutta	Communist Party of India
2011	Chhaya Dolai	Communist Party of India
2016	Chhaya Dolai	All India Trinamool Congress
2021	Arup Dhara	All India Trinamool Congress
2026	Sukanta Dolui	Bharatiya Janata Party

== Election results ==
=== 2026 ===
2026 West Bengal Legislative Assembly election: Chandrakona
Party	Candidate	Votes	%	±%
BJP	Sukanta Dolui	140,517	53.09	▲8.74
AITC	Surjya Kanta Doloi	107,036	40.44	▼8.43
CPI(M)	Suparna Dolai Mallick	12,142	4.59	New entry
INC	Monika Midya	2,500	0.94	New entry
NOTA	None of the above	1,795	0.68	▼0.49
Majority		33,481	12.65	▲8.13
Turnout		264,690	93.50	▲4.42
BJP gain from AITC		Swing		

=== 2021 ===
2021 West Bengal Legislative Assembly election: Chandrakona
Party	Candidate	Votes	%	±%
AITC	Arup Dhara	121,846	48.87	▼3.17
BJP	Sibaram Das	110,565	44.35	▲35.24
ISF	Gouranga Das	10,801	4.33	New entry
NOTA	None of the above	2,906	1.17	▼0.05
Majority		11,281	4.52	▼12.53
Turnout		249,315	89.08	▼0.87
AITC hold		Swing		

=== 2016 ===
2016 West Bengal Legislative Assembly election: Chandrakona
Party	Candidate	Votes	%	±%
AITC	Chhaya Dolai	117,172	52.04	▲4.29
CPI(M)	Santinath Bodhuk	78,791	34.99	▼13.40
BJP	Bilash Dolui	7,753	9.11	▲5.25
SS	Ashes Sardar	4,447	1.98	New entry
NOTA	None of the above	2,746	1.22	New entry
Majority		38,381	17.05	▲16.41
Turnout		225,151	89.95	▼2.92
AITC gain from CPI(M)		Swing		

=== 2011 ===
2011 West Bengal Legislative Assembly election: Chandrakona
Party	Candidate	Votes	%	±%
CPI(M)	Chhaya Dolai	97,280	48.39	
AITC	Sibaram Das	95,984	47.75	
BJP	Bapi Dera	7,753	3.86	
Majority		1,296	0.64	
Turnout		201,017	92.87	
CPI(M) hold		Swing		

=== 1977-2006 ===
In the 2006, 2001 and 1996 state assembly elections, Gurupada Dutta of CPI(M) won the 196 Chandrakona assembly seat defeating Lakshmipriya Mondal of Trinamool Congress in 2006, Prabir Kushari of Trinamool Congress in 2001, and Maloy Bhattacharya of Congress in 1996. Contests in most years were multi cornered but only winners and runners are being mentioned. Umapati Chakraborty of CPI(M) defeated Satya Ghosal of UCPI in 1991, Sk. Khalilur Rahaman of Congress in 1987, Satya Ghosal, Independent, in 1982, and Jagannath Goswami of Congress in 1977.

=== 1962-1972 ===
Satya Ghoshal of CPI won in 1972. Soroshi Choudhury of CPI(M) won in 1971 and 1969. Indrajit Roy of Congress won in 1967 and 1962.
