= Hemanta Bag =

Indian politician (born 1995)

Member of the West Bengal Legislative Assembly
- Incumbent
- Assumed office 4 May 2026
- Preceded by: Madhusudan Bag
- Constituency: Arambagh

Personal details
- Party: Bharatiya Janata Party
- Parent: Hiralal Bag
- Occupation: Day Labour
- Profession: Politician

Hemanta Bag (born 1995) is an Indian politician from West Bengal. He is a member of West Bengal Legislative Assembly from Arambag Assembly constituency, which is reserved for Scheduled Caste community, in Hooghly district representing the Bharatiya Janata Party.

== Early life ==
Bag is from Arambagh, Hooghly district, West Bengal. He is the son of Haradhan Bag. He dropped out of school after passing his Class 4 exams in 2010 at Hatbasantapur, Haraparbati Institution but later passed Class 12 under the West Bengal Council of Higher Secondary Education in the year of 2013. He works as a daily labourer and declared assets worth Rs.1 lakh in his affidavit to the Election Commission of India.

== Career ==
Bag won the Arambag Assembly constituency representing the Bharatiya Janata Party in the 2026 West Bengal Legislative Assembly election. He polled 1,23,000 votes and defeated his nearest rival, Mita Bag of the All India Trinamool Congress, by a margin of 28,959 votes.

== Electoral performance ==
West Bengal Legislative Assembly
Year	Constituency	Party	Votes	%	Opponent	Party	Votes	%	Margin	Result
2026	Arambagh	BJP	1,23,000	52.15	Mita Bag	AITC	94,041	38.77	28,959	Won

== See also ==
- 2026 West Bengal Legislative Assembly election
- List of chief ministers of West Bengal
- West Bengal Legislative Assembly
