= Biman Ghosh =

Indian politician

Member of the West Bengal Legislative Assembly
- Incumbent
- Assumed office 2 May 2021
- Preceded by: Dr. M. Nuruzzaman
- Constituency: Pursurah

Personal details
- Party: Bharatiya Janata Party
- Education: University of Burdwan, B.A.
- Profession: Social Worker

Biman Ghosh is an Indian politician from Bharatiya Janata Party. In May 2021, he was elected as a member of the West Bengal Legislative Assembly from Pursurah (constituency). He defeated Dilip Yadav of All India Trinamool Congress by 28,178 votes in 2021 West Bengal Assembly election.

== Controversy ==
During the Ram Navami procession, aviolence took place in the towns of Rishra and Serampore of Hooghly district, West Bengal. He reportedly took part in that procession and got injured during the clash and violence.
