= Pursurah Assembly constituency =

Pursurah
- Constituency No. 199 for the West Bengal Legislative Assembly
- Interactive Map Outlining Pursurah Assembly Constituency

Constituency details
- Country: India
- Region: East India
- State: West Bengal
- District: Hooghly
- Lok Sabha constituency: Arambagh
- Established: 1967
- Total electors: 213,942
- Reservation: None

Member of Legislative Assembly
- 18th West Bengal Legislative Assembly
- Incumbent Biman Ghosh
- Party: BJP
- Alliance: NDA
- Elected year: 2026

Pursurah Assembly constituency is an assembly constituency in Hooghly district in the Indian state of West Bengal.

== Overview ==
As per orders of the Delimitation Commission, No. 199 Pursurah Assembly constituency is composed of the following: Pursurah community development block, along with Arunda, Balipur, Rammohan I, Rammohan II and Tantisal gram panchayats of Khanakul I community development block, and Harinkhola I and Harinkhola II gram panchayats of Arambagh community development block.

Pursurah Assembly constituency is part of No. 29 Arambagh Lok Sabha constituency (SC).

== Members of the Legislative Assembly ==
Year	Name	Party
1967	Santi Mohan Roy	Indian National Congress
1969	Santi Mohan Roy	Indian National Congress
1971	Mahadeb Mukhopadhyay	Indian National Congress
1972	Mahadeb Mukhopadhyay	Indian National Congress
1977	Manoranjan Hazra	Communist Party of India (Marxist)
1982	Santi Mohan Roy	Indian National Congress
1987	Bishnupada Bera	Communist Party of India (Marxist)
1991	Bishnupada Bera	Communist Party of India (Marxist)
1996	Nimai Mal	Communist Party of India (Marxist)
2001	Nimai Mal	Communist Party of India (Marxist)
2006	Saumendra Nath Bera	Communist Party of India (Marxist)
2011	Parvez Rahaman	Trinamool Congress
2016	M. Nuruzzaman	Trinamool Congress
2021	Biman Ghosh	Bharatiya Janata Party
2026	Biman Ghosh	Bharatiya Janata Party

== Election results ==
=== 2026 ===
2026 West Bengal Legislative Assembly election: Pursurah
Party	Candidate	Votes	%	±%
BJP	Biman Ghosh	138,821	57.62	▲4.12
AITC	Partha Hazari	85,368	35.43	▼5.43
CPI(M)	Sandip Kumar Samanta	8,772	3.64	▼36.08
INC	HABIBAR RAHAMAN SK	1,099	0.46	▼3.05
NOTA	None of the above	2,779	1.15	▼0.1
Majority		53,453	22.19	▲9.55
Turnout		240,924	92.73	▲6.93
BJP hold		Swing		

=== 2021 ===
2021 West Bengal Legislative Assembly election: Pursurah
Party	Candidate	Votes	%	±%
BJP	Biman Ghosh	119,334	53.5	▲44.62
AITC	Dilip Yadav	91,156	40.86	▼10.24
INC	Monika Malik Ghosh	7,828	3.51	▼33.45
NOTA	None of the above	2,788	1.25	▼0.52
Majority		28,178	12.64	▼1.50
Turnout		223,074	85.8	▼0.53
BJP gain from AITC		Swing		

=== 2016 ===
2016 West Bengal Legislative Assembly election: Pursurah
Party	Candidate	Votes	%	±%
AITC	M. Nuruzzaman	105,275	51.10	▼5.16
INC	Pratim Singha Roy	76,148	36.96	New entry
BJP	Subhendu Mukherjee	18,296	8.88	▲4.85
NOTA	None of the Above	3,646	1.77	New entry
Independent	Jhantu Saha	2,649	1.29	New entry
Majority		29,127	14.14	▼2.40
Turnout		2,06,014	86.33	▼3.19
AITC hold		Swing		

=== 2011 ===
2011 West Bengal Legislative Assembly election: Pursurah
Party	Candidate	Votes	%	±%
AITC	Parvez Rahman	107,794	56.26	
CPI(M)	Saumendra Nath Bera	76,104	39.72	
BJP	Sukumar Dhara	7,718	4.03	
Majority		31,690	16.54	
Turnout		1,91,616	89.52	
AITC gain from CPI(M)		Swing		

=== 1977-2006 ===
In the 2006 state assembly elections Saumendranath Bera of CPI(M) won the Pursurah assembly seat defeating Sk. Parvez Rahman of Trinamool Congress. Contests in most years were multi cornered but only winners and runners are being mentioned. Nimai Mal of CPI(M) defeated Sk. Pervez Rahman of Trinamool Congress in 2001 and Gour Mohan Maity of Congress in 1996. Bishnupada Bera of CPI(M) defeated Bibhuti Bhusan Roy of Congress in 1991 and Santi Mohun Roy of Congress in 1987. Santi Mohun Roy of Congress defeated Bishnupada Bera of CPI(M) in 1982. Manoranjan Hazra of CPI(M) defeated Durga Charan Chakrabarty of Janata Party in 1977.

=== 1952-1972 ===
Mahadeb Mukhopadhyay of Congress won in 1972 and 1971. Santi Mohan Roy of Congress won in 1969 and 1967. Prior to that the Pursurah seat did not exist.
