= 2022 Birbhum violence =

Massacre in Rampurhat, West Bengal, India

- 2022 Birbhum violence (West Bengal) 2022 Birbhum violence (India)
- Location: 24°09′52″N 87°47′29″E; Bagtui, Birbhum district, West Bengal, India
- Date: March 21, 2022; 21:00 (IST (UTC+05:30))
- Attack type: mass murder, political violence, arson attack
- Deaths: 10
- Victim: 1.Jahanara Bibi (Doli), 38; 2.Lili Khatun, 18; 3.Sheli Bibi, 32; 4.Nurnehar Bibi, 52; 5.Rupali Bibi, 39; 6.Kazi Sajidur Rahaman, 22; 7.Tuli Khatun, 7; 8. Mina Bibi, 40 https://www.telegraphindia.com/west-bengal/birbhum-eight-charred-to-death-in-suspected-retaliation-to-tmc-leaders-murder/cid/1857148
- Motive: Revenge for killing of local Trinamool leader
- Accused: Lalan sheikh, Later died in CBI custody https://indianexpress.com/article/cities/kolkata/birbhum-violence-key-accused-ends-life-in-cbi-custody-kin-allege-murder-8321023/

The 2022 Birbhum violence, also called the Bogtui massacre, happened in the village of Baktai (Bagtui, Bogtui) in Rampurhat I block, Birbhum, India in the aftermath of the death of Trinamool deputy chief Bhadu Sheikh. At least four houses were set on fire. 10 people were reported killed.

== Background ==
During the evening of 21 March 2022. Bhadu Sheikh, the upapradhan (deputy leader) of Barshal gram panchayat (village council), was attacked by a group of men, who threw a homemade bomb at him, resulting in heavy injury. He was taken to the local health clinic and later the Rampurhat hospital where he was declared dead.

== Casualties ==
Victims of Bogtui massacre
Jahanara Bibi (Doli), 38
Lili Khatun, 18
Sheli Bibi, 32
Nurnehar Bibi, 52
Rupali Bibi, 39
Kazi Sajidur Rahaman, 22
Tuli Khatun, 7
Mina Bibi, 40
Najima Bibi, 35
Atahara Bibi, 40

At least ten houses were set on fire. 8 dead bodies were found, six women and two children. Seven burned bodies were recovered from one house alone. Two women who had been injured later died of burn injuries at a hospital in Rampurhat. The dead all belonged to the family of Mihilal Sheikh, who escaped alive.

== Investigation ==
Following the incident, Government of West Bengal has created SIT under ADG CID Gyanwant Singh, DIG (Western Range) Sanjay Singh and DIG CID (Operations) Miraj Khalid to investigate the incident. State director general of police Manoj Malviya is also enacted in this case.

On 12 December, the CBI announced the death in custody of the main accused perpetrator, Lalon Sheikh, by suicide (hanging) at their camp in Rampurhat. His family alleged he had been beaten to death in custody.

== Reactions ==
The ruling party Trinamool Congress alleged that the "incident was a part of a greater conspiracy to tarnish the image of the State and the State government". Chief Minister Mamata Banerjee sent Minister Firhad Hakim and local MLA and deputy Speaker Ashish Banerjee to the trouble spot.

Opposition parties like CPI(M), BJP and Congress protested against the murder. CPI(M) state secretary Mohammad Salim described the SIT set up by the government as "suppression of investigation and truth". He also said that the incident in Rampurhat was linked to the victory of the sole CPM councillor from Ward 17 in the Rampurhat municipality which went to polls in February 2022. In response to the incident and while obstructed from raising the issue to Legislative Assembly, BJP legislators staged a walkout on the floor of the House. BJP MLAs requested the Governor to urge the Centre to intervene here and invoke either Article 365 or 355 and consider a NIA probe into the matter. Bengal Congress Unit Adhir Ranjan Chowdhury wrote to the President of India requesting him to invoke Article 355 of the Indian Constitution “in view of the deteriorating law & order situation in West Bengal" and has called Mamata Banerjee-led TMC rule as "Danav Raj"(Monster Rule).

National Human Rights Commission (NHRC) took suo motu cognisance of the violence and has directed the state government to submit detailed report regarding the violence in four weeks.

Governor of West Bengal Jagdeep Dhankar condemned the killings. Fake news also spread that the killings were caused by communal violence.
