= Madhusudan Bag =

Indian politician

Member of the West Bengal Legislative Assembly
- In office 2 May 2021 – 5 May 2026
- Preceded by: Krishna Chandra Santra
- Succeeded by: Hemanta Bag
- Constituency: Arambagh

Personal details
- Party: Bharatiya Janata Party
- Education: Master of Arts in History
- Alma mater: Vidyasagar University
- Profession: Teacher

Madhusudan Bag is an Indian politician from Bharatiya Janata Party. In May 2021, he was elected as a member of the West Bengal Legislative Assembly from Arambagh Assembly constituency.

He defeated Sujata Mondal of Trinamool Congress by 7,172 votes in 2021 West Bengal Legislative Assembly election.
