= Chandrakona =

- Town
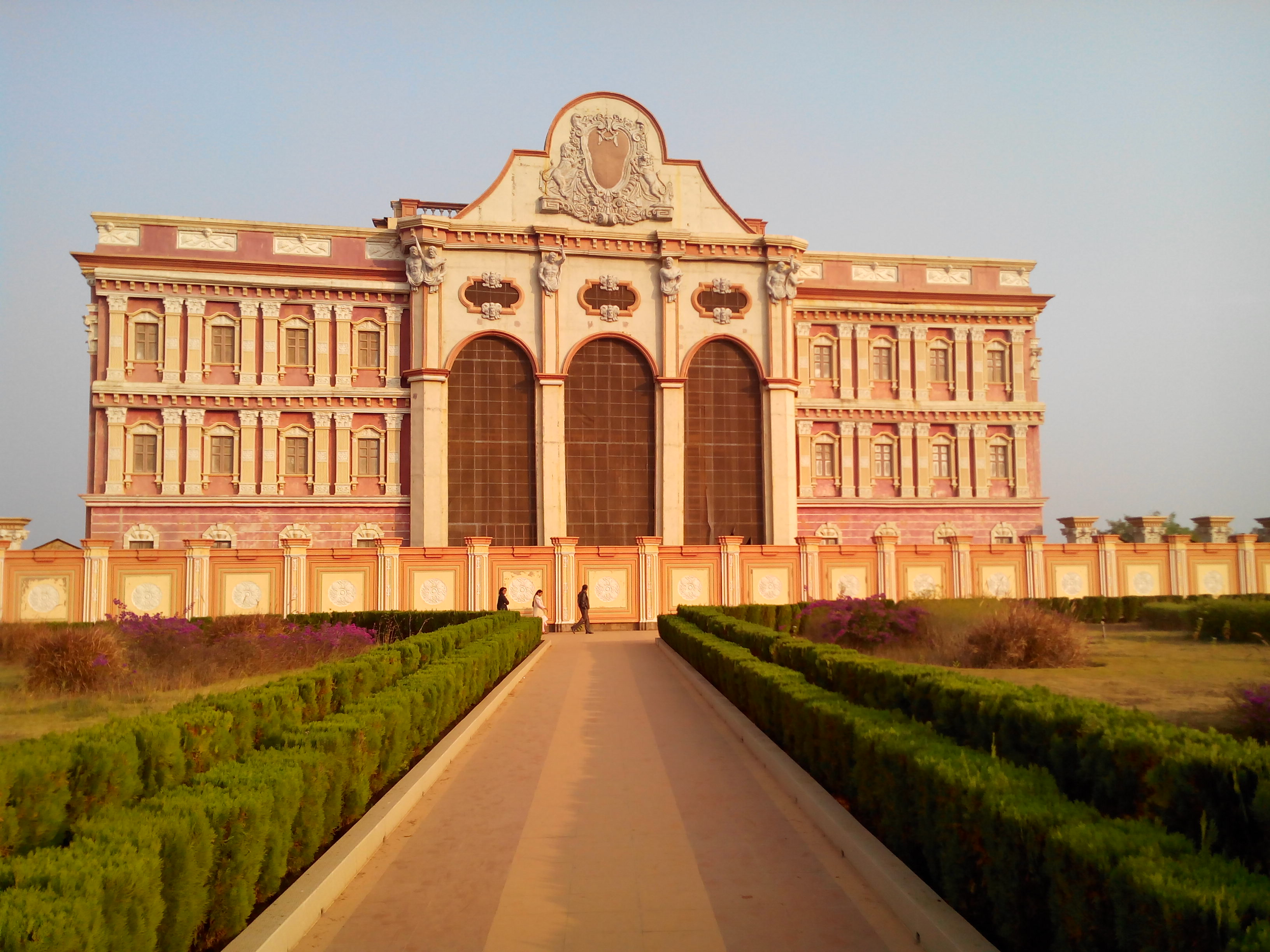
- Prayag film city at Chandrakona

- Location in West Bengal, India Chandrakona (India)
- Coordinates: 22.73°N 87.52°E
- Country: India
- State: West Bengal
- District: Paschim Medinipur

Government
  - Type: Municipality
  - Body: Chandrakona Municipality

Area
  - Total: 16.58 km^{2} (6.40 sq mi)
- Elevation: 28 m (92 ft)

Population (2011)
  - Total: 23,629
  - Density: 1,425/km^{2} (3,691/sq mi)

Languages
  - Official: Bengali, English
- Time zone: UTC+5:30 (IST)
- PIN: 721201
- Telephone code: 03225
- ISO 3166 code: IN-WB
- Lok Sabha constituency: Arambagh
- Vidhan Sabha constituency: Chandrakona

Chandrakona is a town and a municipality in the Ghatal subdivision of Paschim Medinipur district in the state of West Bengal, India. The city is located between Ghatal and Garhbeta. Chandraketu was the founder of the kingdom of Chandrakona. In the Ain-E-Akbari, the 16th century Mughal document, it was mentioned as ‘Mana’.

== History ==
A traceable history of Chandrakona and its adjoining areas begins to emerge about 690 A.D. when the Malla Dynasty was founded at Bishnupur. It must have been at that time a prosperous place, but not much else is certain. Historically, it was turbulent times; the anarchical period known as Matsyanyaya (মৎস্যন‌্যায়) in the history of Bengal. But tucked into the less-populated, forest covered fringes of the Chotonagpur plateau, the kingdom of Bishnupur lived by its own standards. And thanks to its excellent supply-system of agriculturally rich areas irrigated by river Shilaboti and its canals, Chandrakona grew in eminence, though gradually. 17th century scholar Jagamohan Pandit, in his Sanskrit geography-text Deshavali Vivriti, described Chandrakona as an important place in Bhan Desh - a land lying between the rivers Kangsabati and Shilaboti; a rich land where quality jute grew in abundance and sustained a renowned jute-textile industry. Cotton also grew, and the cotton-textile industry was almost equally famous. Its rivers and waterbodies yielded abundant fish and sustained a large population of fishermen. This prosperity was gained even as the Mughals and the Pathans clashed over the terrain for dominance till the former emerged victorious.

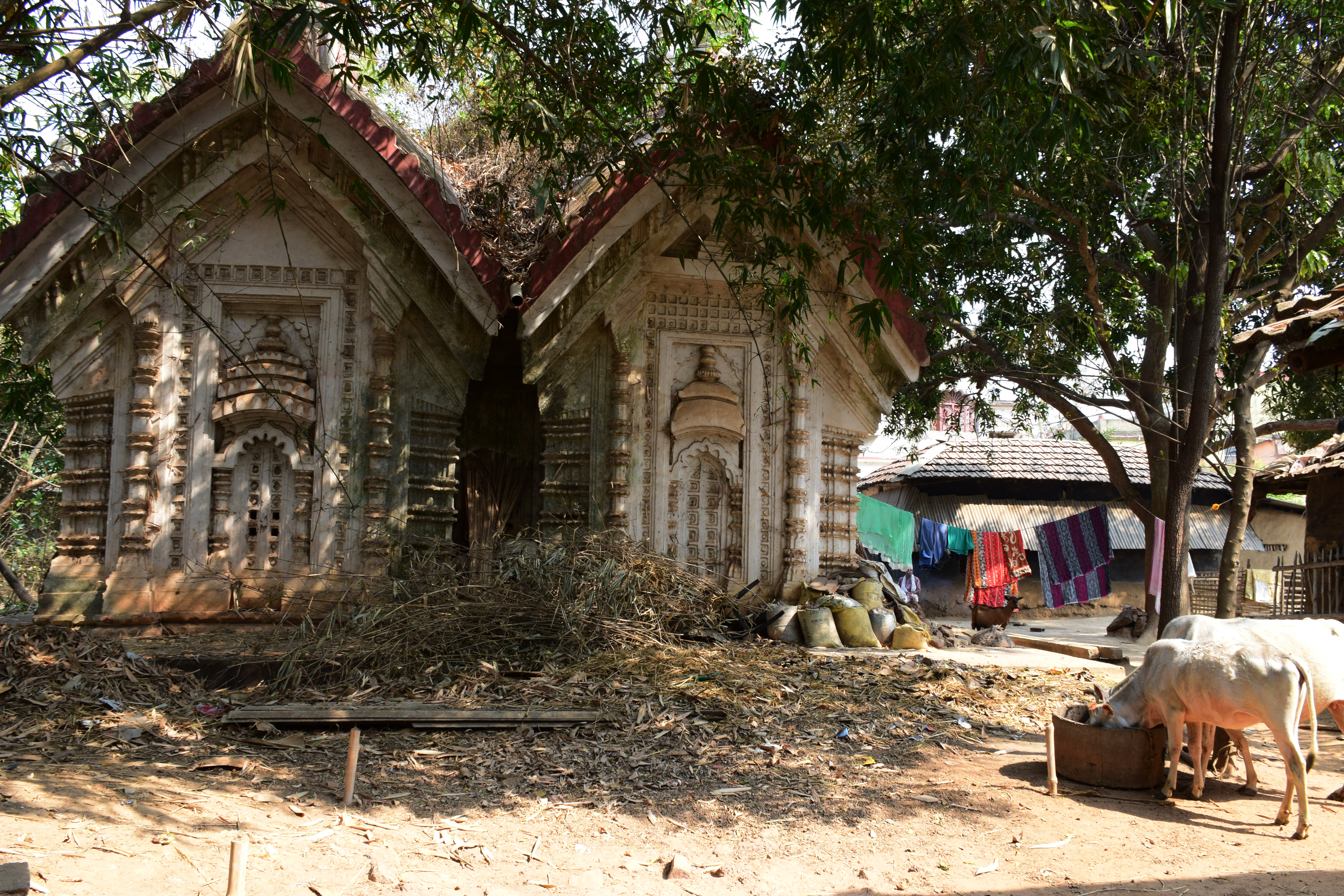
Chandrakona Jor Bangla temple

The political stability required for this prosperity came Chandrakona's way as the chief of a Rajput contingent, Indraketu, established almost independent rule here in the early 15th century. At about the same time another Rajput, Gajapati Singh, assumed the rule of Bagri, lying west of Chandrakona. These two tiny kingdoms fought each other several times during the next centuries, so that their family trees and fate became inextricably entangled.

Chandrakona thrived during the century-long rule of the Ketu kings. The town probably got its name from the third of them - Chandraketu. Jogesh Chandra Basu, a scholar on the history of Medinipur, says that Chandrakona was previously known as Mana. Chandraketu ruled during the early decades of the fifteenth century. The Gurudwara of Chandrakona dates from this time. Guru Nanakji and Mardanaji came to Chandrakona in 1510 on their way to Puri and set up a manji here which has now evolved into a gurudwara revered and visited by Sikhs from different parts of the state.

During Mughal rule Chandrakona retained its status of a semi-independent kingdom. By the middle of the 16th century, Birbhan Singh, a Chauhan, began a new line of rulers. They efficiently ruled over the town for about 150 years, till in the early eighteenth century Maharaj Kirtichandra of Burdwan overthrew Raghunath Singh, the last of them. However, most of what constitutes the glory of Chandrakona, its temple complexes and its large tanks, tell us of the interest the Bhan rulers took in public works as well as of their patronage of religion and art. The legendary prosperity of Chandrakona, a town with fifty-two market places and a network of fifty-three inter-linked roads, owed itself to the efficient administration of the Bhan rulers.

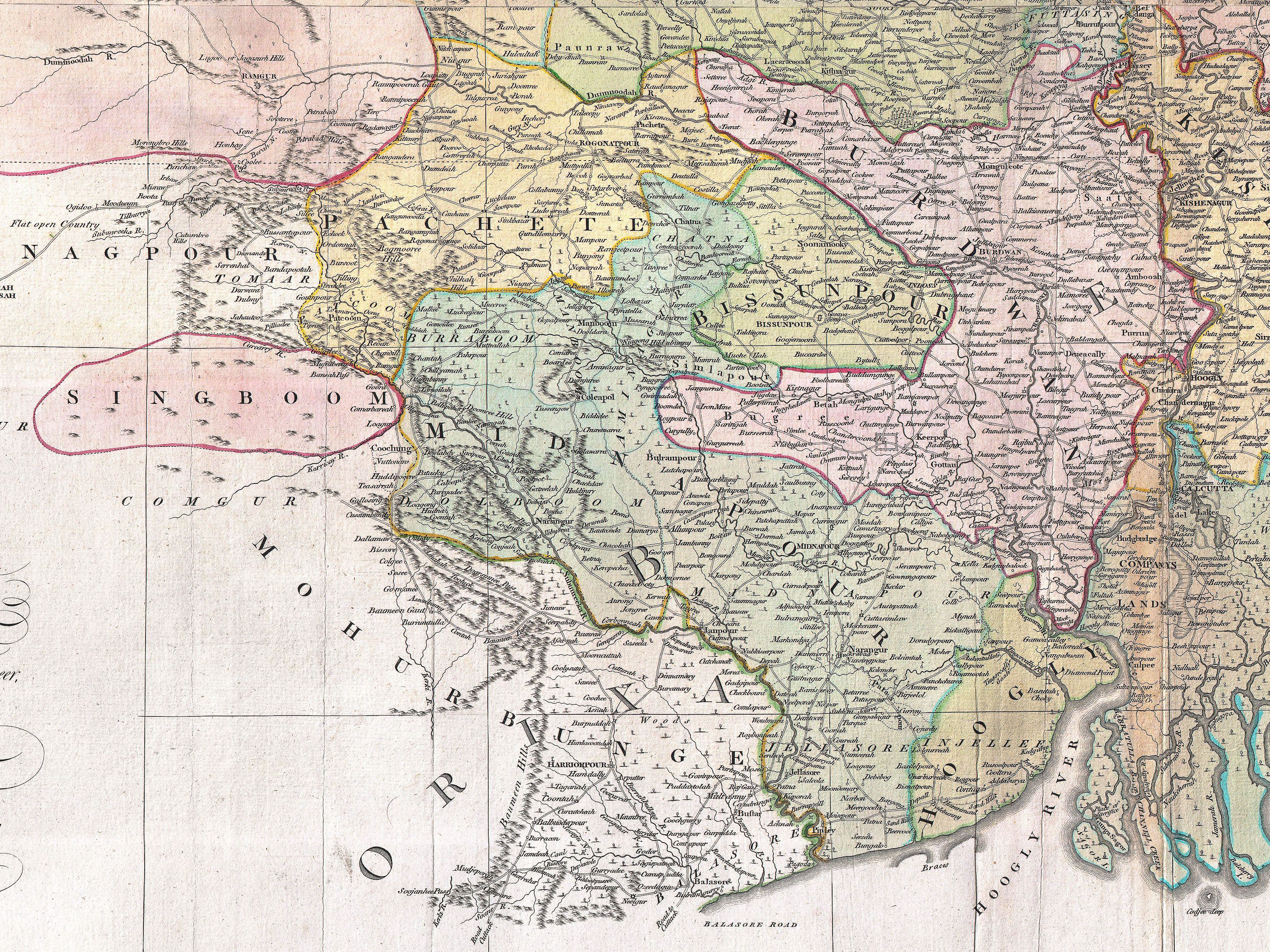
Chandrakona (termed Chandercoonah) under jurisdiction of Burdwan, 1776

Chandrakona came under the British East India Company in 1760. The textile industry was most hardly hit as a consequence. The famous weavers of Chandrakona had either to re-locate or to take up farming as profession. However, the town held its own as an important centre of trade and commerce. In the nineteenth century Chandrakona was known for producing quality brass utensils. It got its municipal administration in 1869 and Beverley's Census Report of Bengal, 1872, records that the town had a population of 21,311; that is to say, almost equal to its present population. Once a part of Hooghly district, the town was incorporated into the Ghatal subdivision of Medinipur district in 1872. Over the next six decades the population of the town depleted alarmingly. In 1931, it was reported to have a population of a little over 6000.

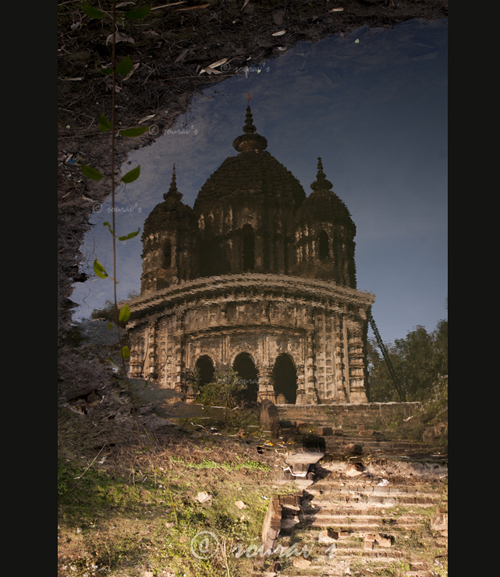
The Temple of Malleswar

Like its more famous neighbour Bishnupur, Chandrakona may also be termed a temple town. Its temples display the blending of several architectural styles - the Rekha-Deul, the char-chala and at-chala styles of Bengal, and so on. Some of them, like the one at Mitrasenpur, are decorated with excellent terracotta plates depicting events from the Mahabharata and the Avatars of Vishnu. The pancharatna temple of Malleswar is also a grand structure. But most of these temples have become dilapidated, and hardly any effort is being made to preserve these heritage structures. In addition to the temples, there are three Asthals i.e. monastic establishments of the Sri Vaishnava Ramanuja sampradaya hailing from the spiritual lineage of the Ahobila Mutt.

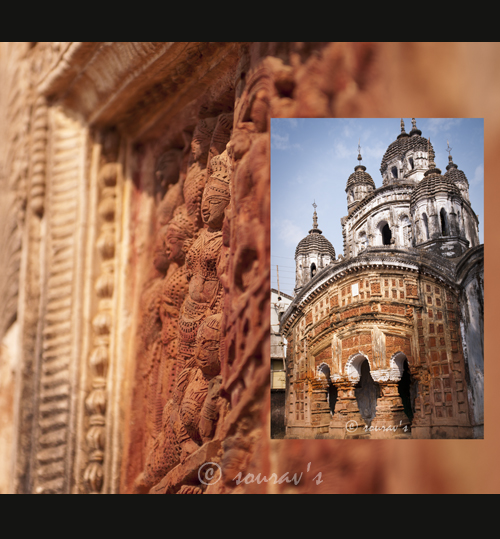
Navaratna temple of Mitrasenpur

The eminence of the Dharmathakur cult in Chandrakona points to the co-existence for centuries of Brahminical and non-Brahminical religions. Several Dharmathakur images are found at Gobindapur, Narahipur and Jayantipur localities of Chandrakona. The Shivagajan festival at the end of the Bengali year, one of the major religious festivals in Chandrakona, is also reminiscent of pre-Aryan rituals.

== Geography ==
Cities and towns in Ghatal subdivision of Paschim Medinipur district
M: municipal city/ town, R: rural/ urban centre, H: historical/ religious centre
Owing to space constraints in the small map, the actual locations in a larger map may vary slightly

=== Location ===
Chandrakona is located at 22.44°N 87.31°E. It has an average elevation of 28 metres (91 feet).

Ghatal subdivision, shown in the map alongside, has alluvial soils. Around 85% of the total cultivated area is cropped more than once. It has a density of population of 1,099 per km^{2}, but being a small subdivision only a little over a fifth of the people in the district reside in this subdivision. 14.33% of the population lives in urban areas and 86.67% lives in the rural areas.

Note: The map alongside presents some of the notable locations in the subdivision. All places marked in the map are linked in the larger full screen map.

== Administration ==
=== CD Block HQ ===
The headquarters of Chandrakona II Block are located at Chandrakona.

=== Police station ===
Chandrakona police station has jurisdiction over Chandrakona, Khirpai and Ramjibanpur municipalities and Chandrakona I and Chandrakona II CD Blocks.

== Demographics ==
Historical population
Year	Pop.	±%
1814	18,145	—
1872	21,311	+17.4%
1881	12,257	−42.5%
1891	11,309	−7.7%
1901	9,309	−17.7%
1911	8,121	−12.8%
1921	6,470	−20.3%
1931	6,016	−7.0%
1941	6,411	+6.6%
1951	5,717	−10.8%
1961	7,383	+29.1%
1971	9,811	+32.9%
1981	13,410	+36.7%
1991		—
2001	20,400	—
2011	23,629	+15.8%
Source: Census of India

As per 2011 Census of India, Chandrakona had a total population of 23,629 of which 11,977 (51%) were males and 11,652 (49%) were females. Population in the age range 0–6 years was 2,526. The total number of literate persons in Chandrakona was 17,564 (83.23% of the population over 6 years).

As of 2001 India census, Chandrakona Municipality had a population of 20,400. Males constitute 51% of the population and females 49%. Chandrakona has an average literacy rate of 66%, higher than the national average of 59.5%; with male literacy of 73% and female literacy of 58%. 14% of the population is under 6 years of age.

== Economy ==
The main economy is dependent on agriculture.

Some of the main agricultural products are rice, potato and jute. Only large scale industry here is formed by about 20 cold storages of potato. A few of the percentage of the people are government employees, School Teachers and employed in other small private sectors. The financial status of most of the people is in middle class and lower middle class category.

== Transportation ==
Chandrakona is well connected by roads/highways to state capital Kolkata and other important towns of South Bengal including Medinipur (42 km South West), Burdwan, Bankura, Haldia, Kharagpur, and Tarakeswar. State Highway 4 (West Bengal) connects the town to National Highway 6 (Kolkata-Mumbai) at Mechogram (60 km South East). The nearest railway station is Chandrakona Road railway station, 20 km West. Locals use bicycles and motorbikes for transportation within the town. Rickshaws, Battery operated rickshaws and cabs are also available.

== Education ==
There are schools and colleges in Chandrakona Town. Institute of Science & Technology is a technology-oriented private college established in 2005. This institute is affiliated to Wbut. It is an emerging engineering and management college in West Medinipur district as well as in West Bengal. There is also another college named Chandrakona Vidyasagar Mahavidyalaya, which is under Vidyasagar University. The schools of Chandrakona Town are Chandrakona Jirat High School, Kalyanshri J D Girls School, Malleswarpur Sarada Vidyapith High School and Atasi Smriti High School.

== Healthcare ==
Chandrakona Rural Hospital, with 60 beds at Chandrakona, is the major government Chandrakona II CD block.

== Culture ==
"The number of temples that are still there in Chandrakona is a matter of wonder." - Binoy Ghosh, historian

Chandrakona and its surrounding areas have numerous temples, some built of laterite, and some are brick-built. These temples are an articulation of local architectural styles and present a wide array of terracotta decoration. Many of the temples have fallen, a few have been painted or spoiled by restoration and others lie uncared for. Chandrakona has a rich heritage.

David J. McCutchion mentions:

- The Jor-Bangla temple at Dakshinbazar as laterite built, possibly in the 17th century, with extensive stucco work, measuring 28’ 4” x 26’.
- The Jhulanmandir in the Thakurbari as a char-chala on an elongated base, laterite built, largely plain, measuring 30’ 9” x 20’.
- The Lalji temple as a low-towered at-chala, laterite-built with stucco figures, measuring, 36’9” x 23’ 9”.
- The Mallesvara temple as a pancha-ratna with ridged rekha turrets and porch on triple archway, laterite-built possibly in the 18th century, with stucco figures, measuring around 26’ square.
- The Santinatha Shiva temple at Mitrasenpur, built in 1828, with rich terracotta, measuring 19’ 6” square.
- The Parvatinatha temple as a standard saptdasa-ratna (17 pinnacled), built in the 19th century, with rich terracotta and stucco, measuring around 21’ 6”.
- The Shiva temple, beside Kankali temple, 19th century built, with terracotta decorations, measuring 9' 1" square.
- Bardhan's temple near Thakurbari as a small flat roofed or chandni type, laterite-built, plain, measuring 12’ 9” x 19’ 7”.
- The Anantadeva temple at Mitrasenpur as a small flat roofed or chandni type, with terracotta decorations, built in 1899, measuring 12’ 10”
- The Dadhivamna temple in Gobindapur as a small flat roofed or chandni type, with terracotta decorations, measuring 14’3” x 13’ 10”.
- The Jagannath temple in Gosai Bazar as a small flat roofed or chandni type, plain, measuring 19’ 5” x 17’ 6”.
- The Raghunatha temple at Gazipur as a flat roofed or chandni type, with curved cornice, laterite-built with stucco work, measuring 16’ 3” x 16’ 6”.
- The Radhaballava temple at Mitrasenpur as a flat roofed or chandni type, with curved cornice, laterite-built in 1781, with stucco work, measuring 17’ 2” x 16’ 8”.
- The Raghunatha temple as rekha-deul or pirha-deul having a pirha porch with base dimension larger than the main temple, laterite built with stucco figures, measuring 15’ 6” square + 19’ 2” square.

== Gallery ==
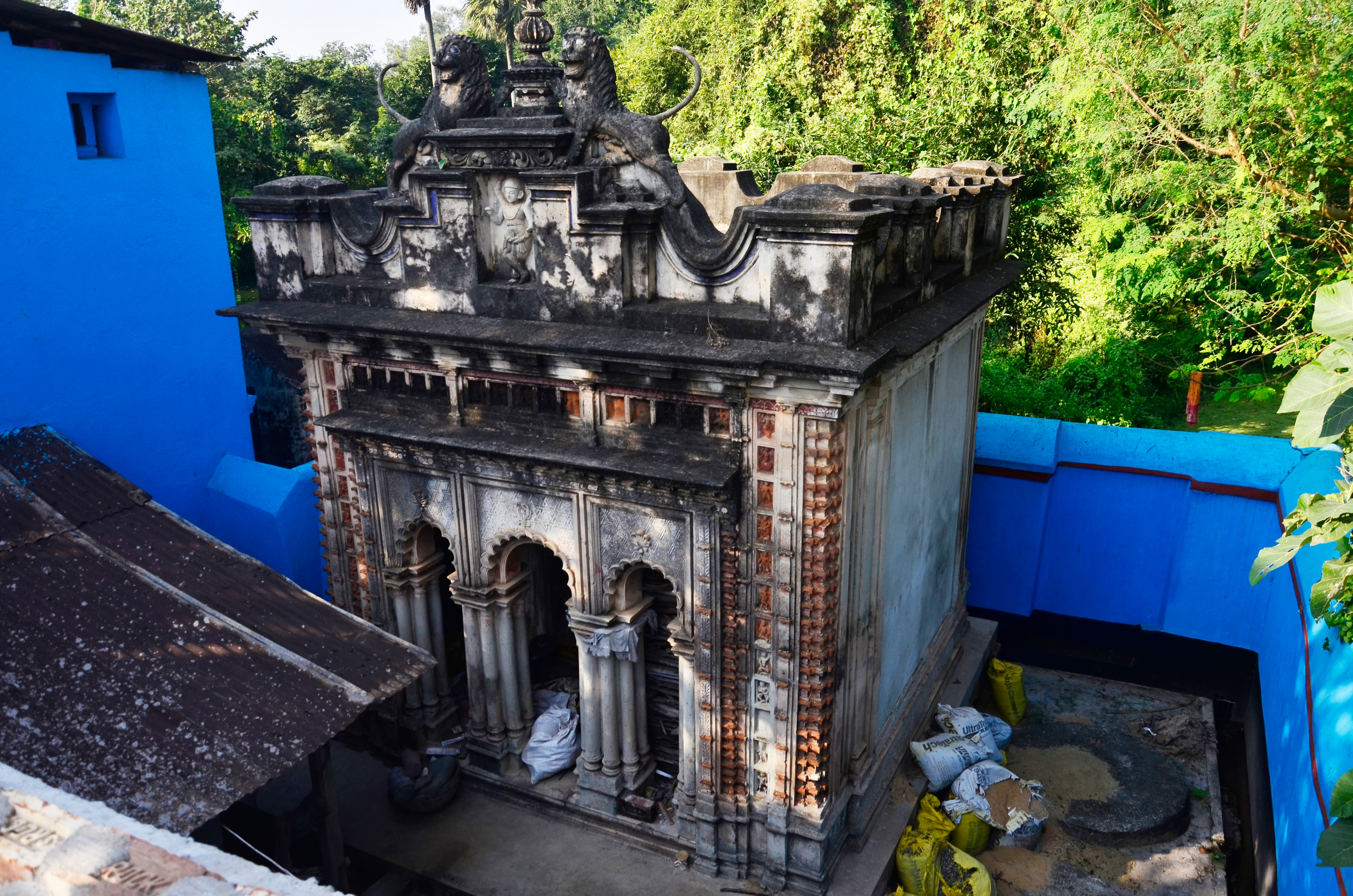
Anantadeva dalan temple in Mitrasenpur, built in 1899

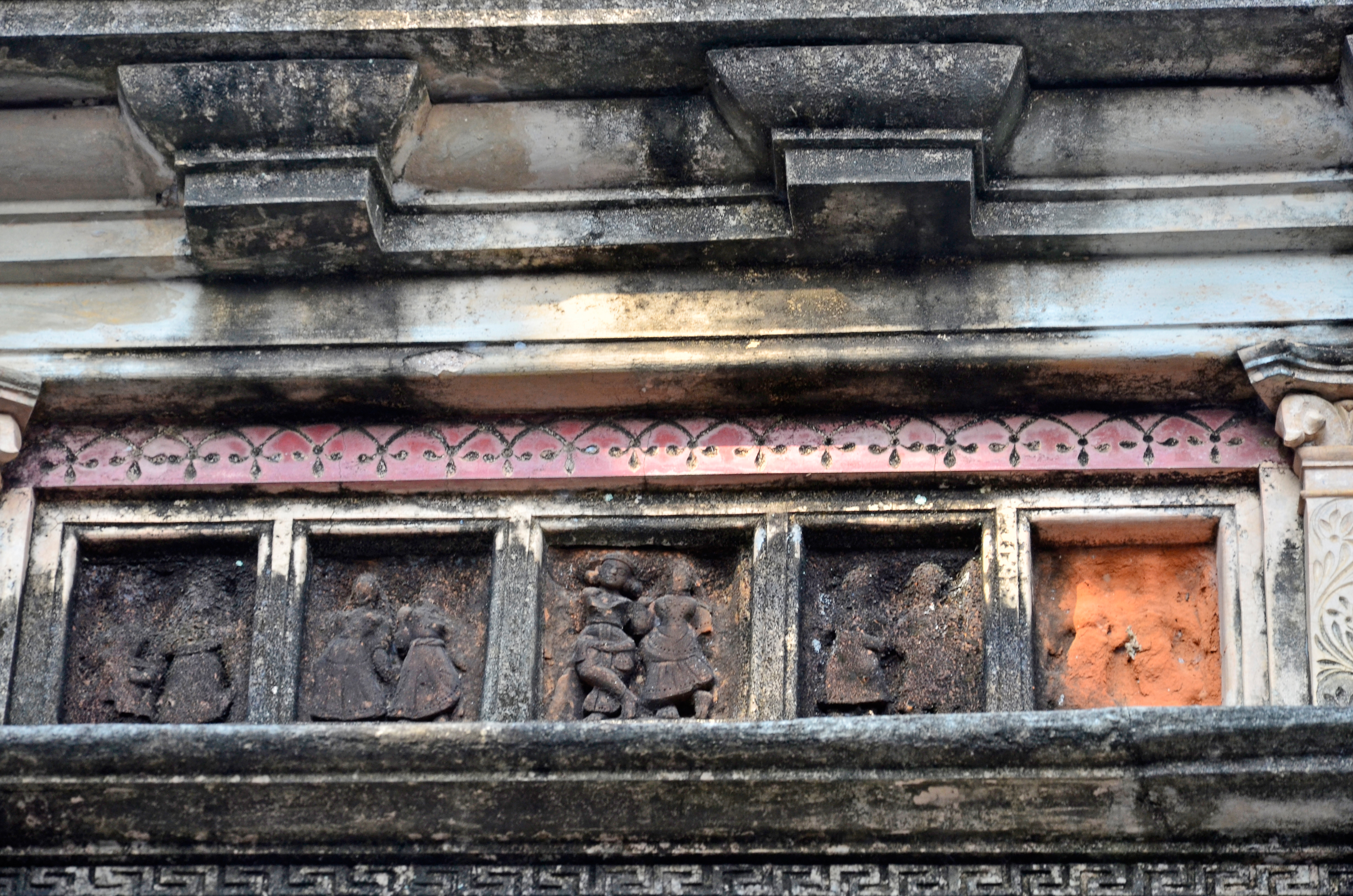
Terracotta and stucco work in Anantadeava temple

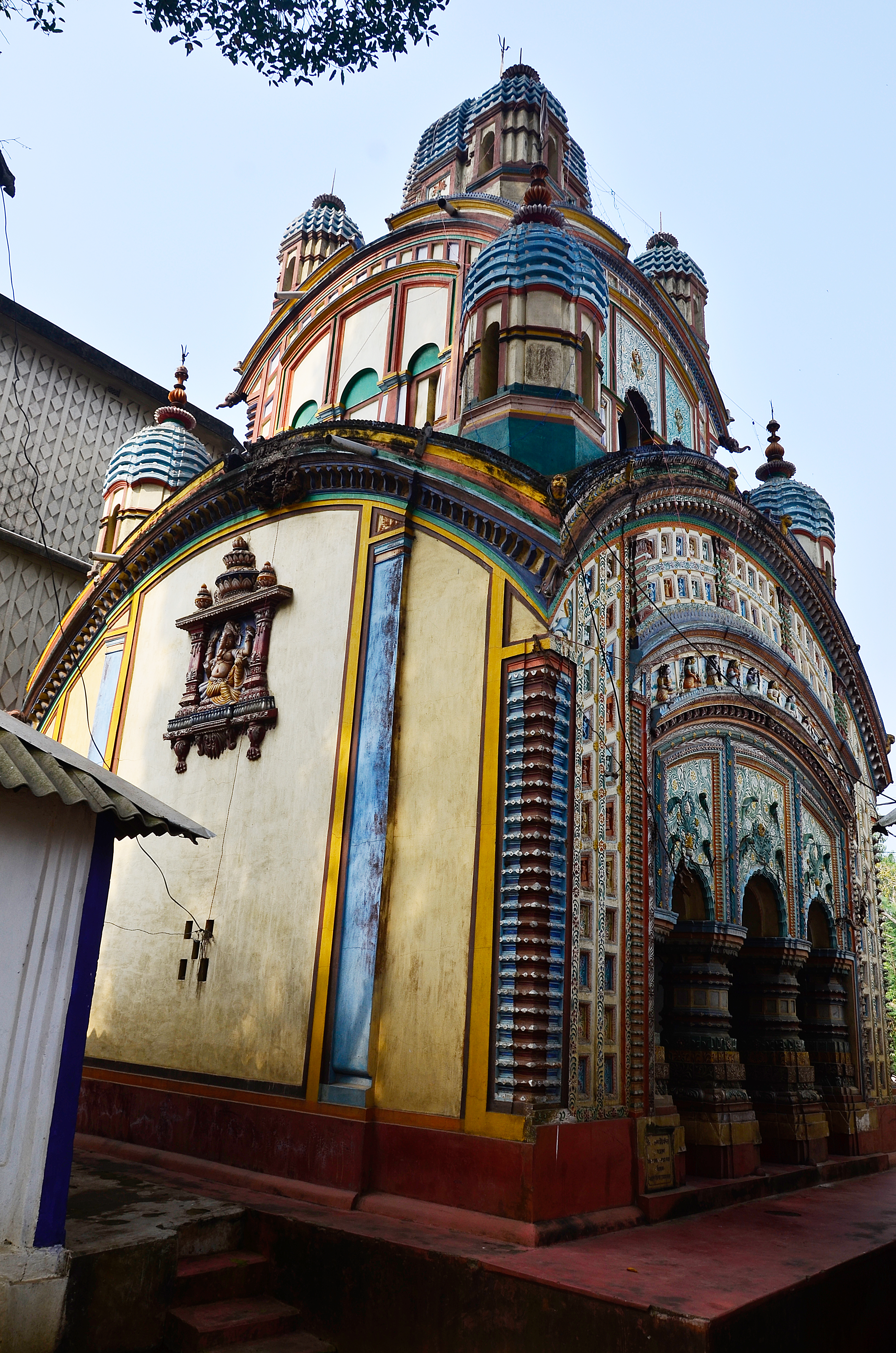
Nava-ratna Buro Shiva temple at Dakshin Bazar

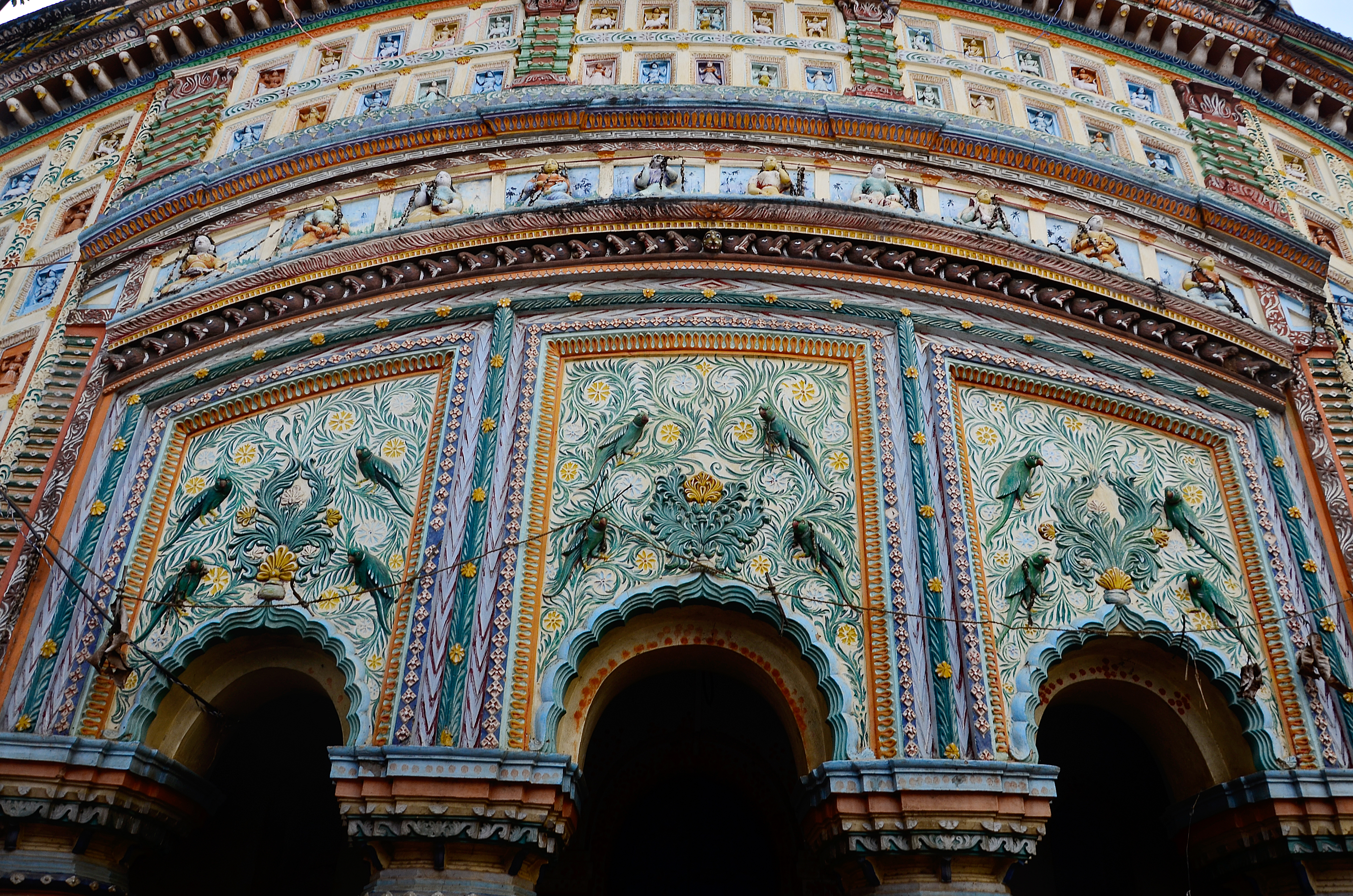
Terracotta plaques and stucco work at Buro Shiva temple

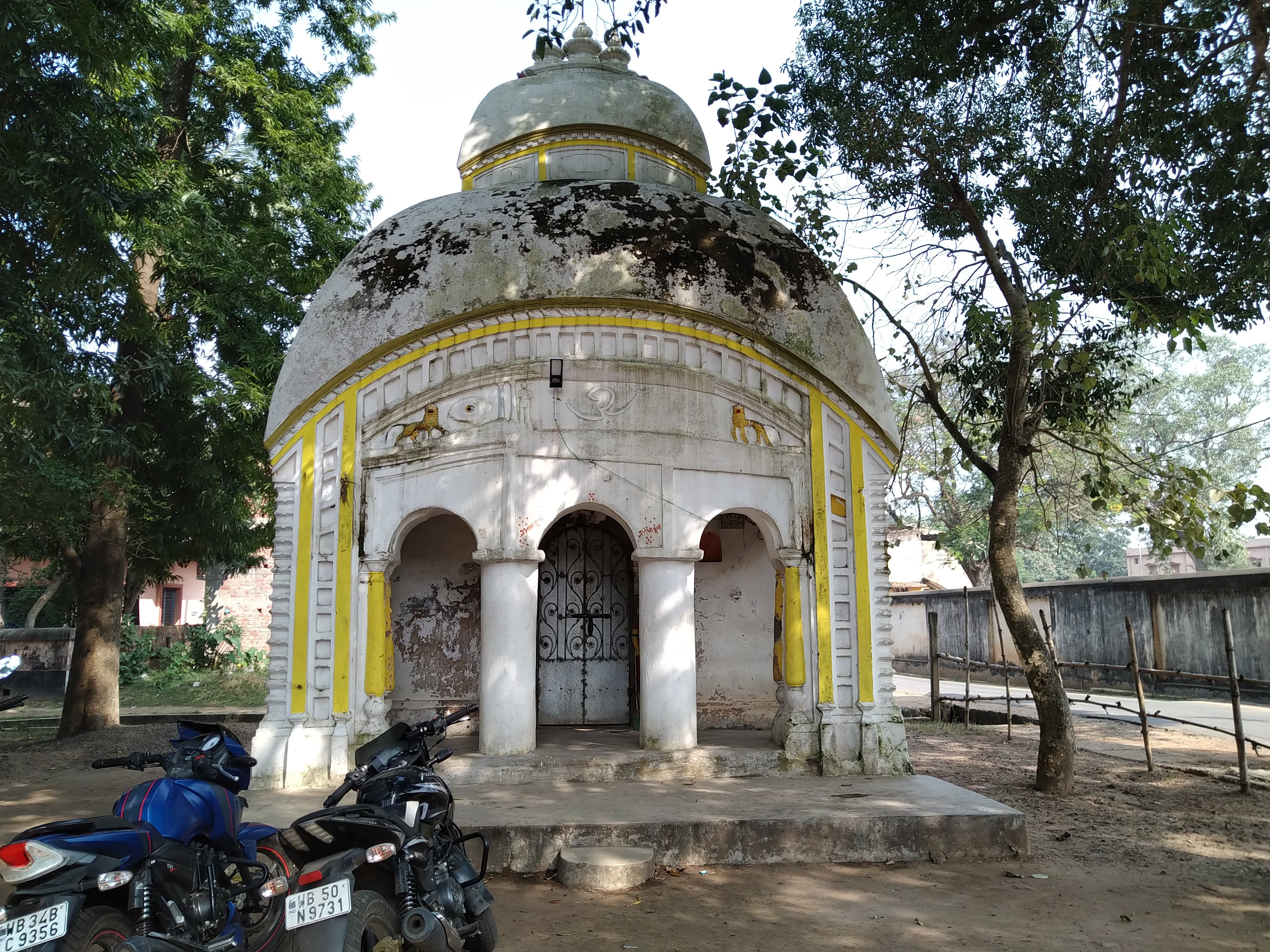
At-chala Khalsa Shiva temple built in 1865 by tambuli merchants

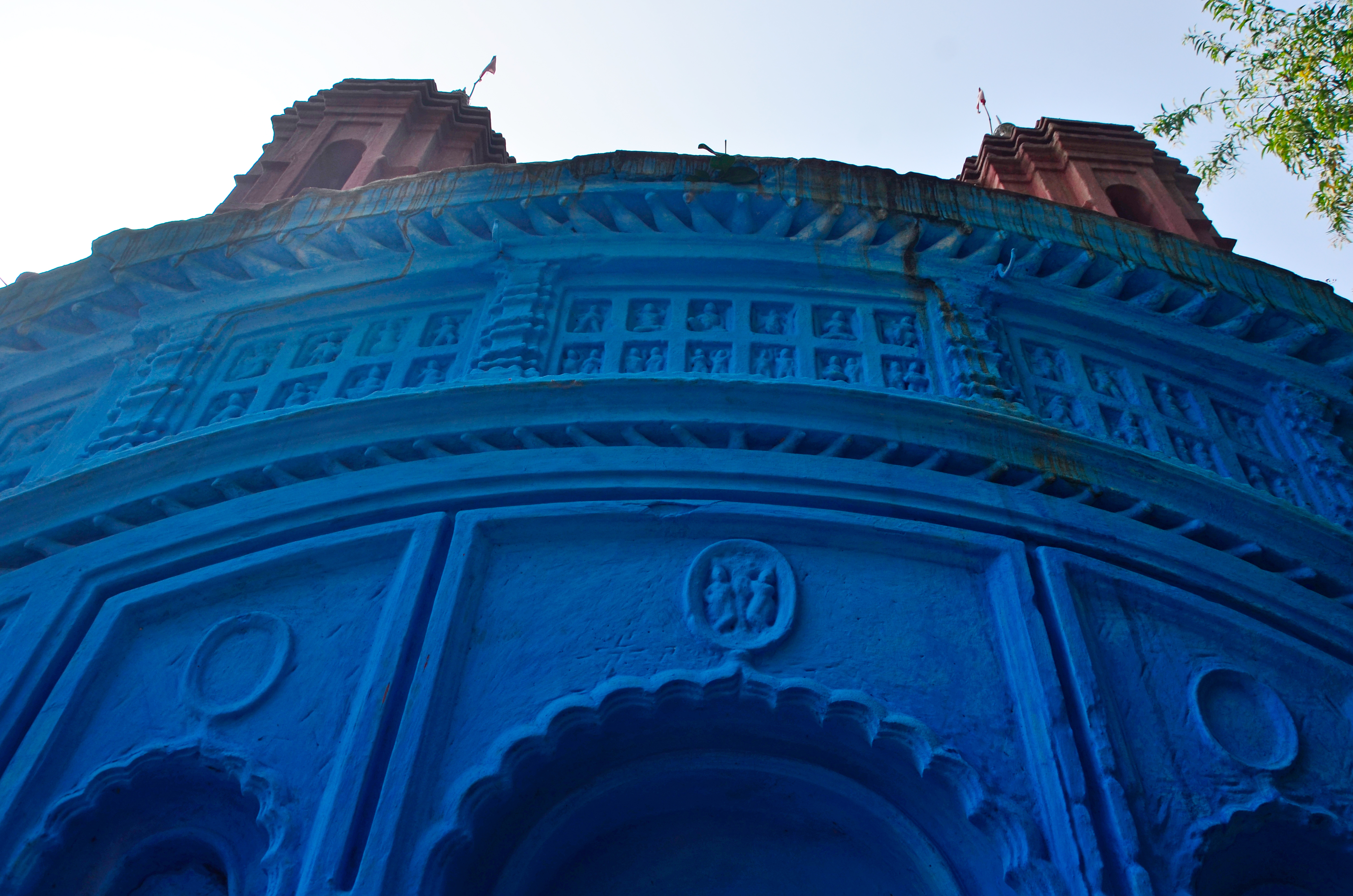
Pancha-ratna Radha Gobinda temple at Ilalmbazar, belongs to the Chabri family, built in 1870

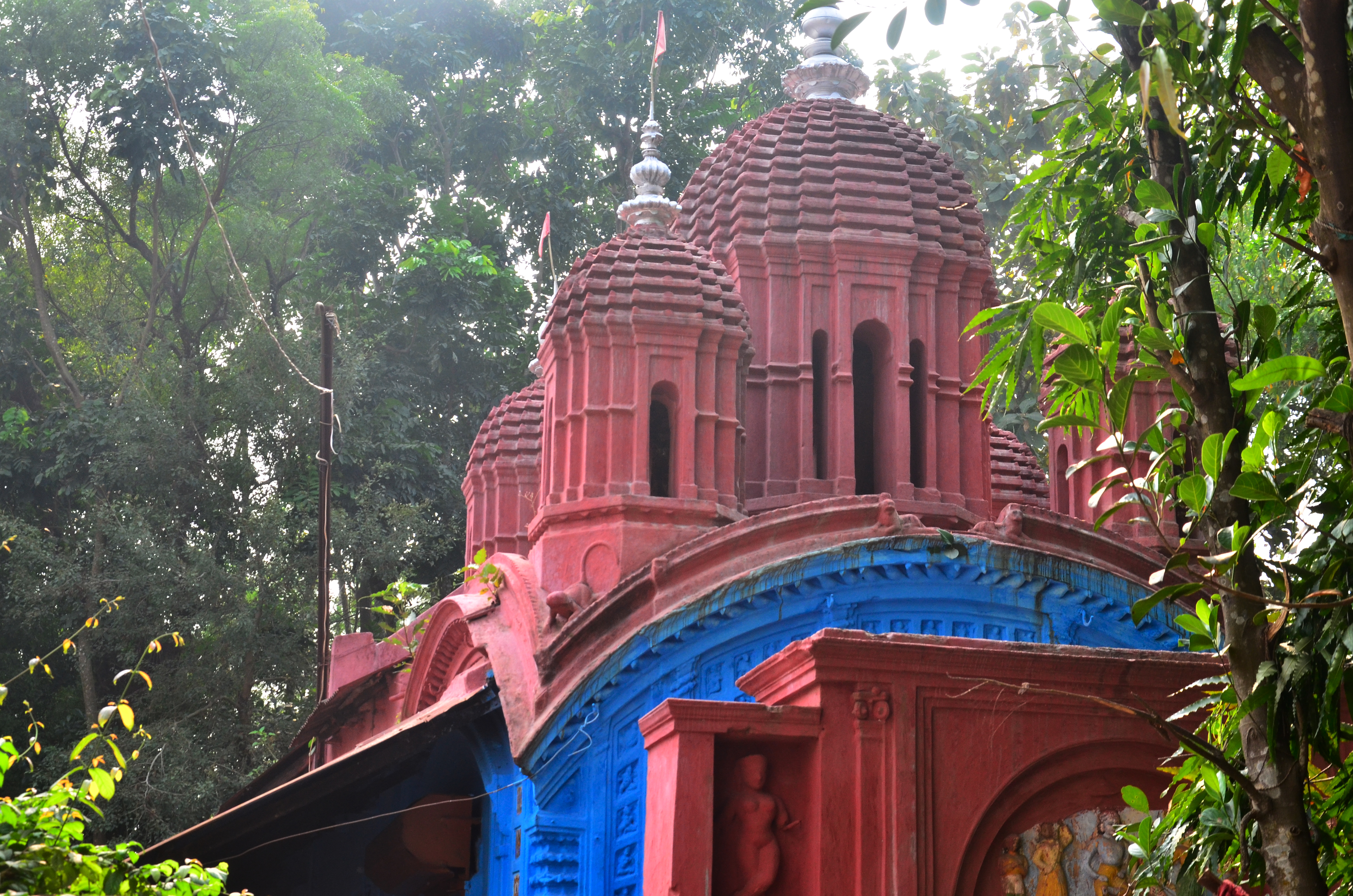
Radhagobinda temple – unskilled restoration work has ruined terracotta plaques

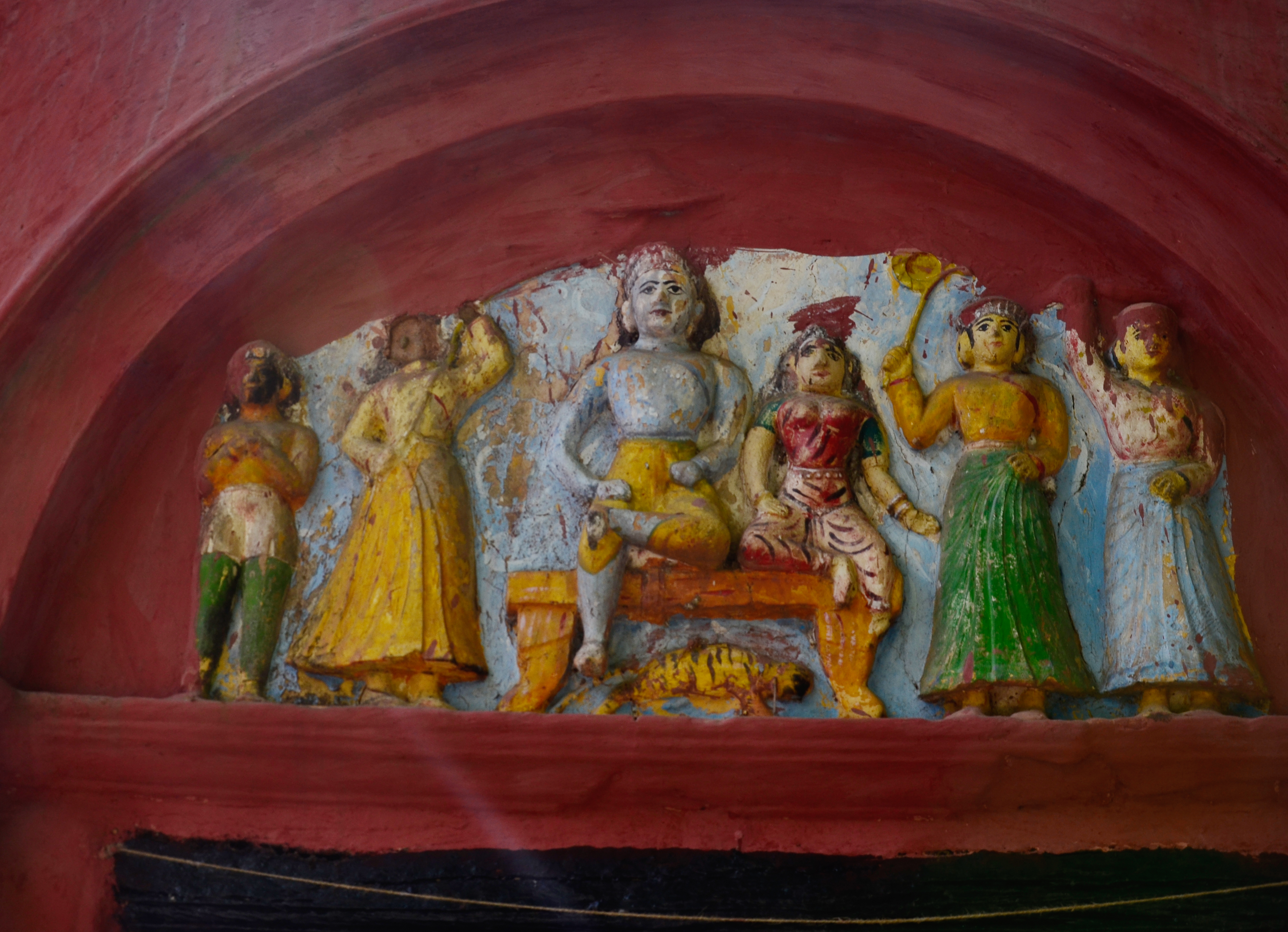
Plaque on the gate of the enclosure of Radhagobinda temple

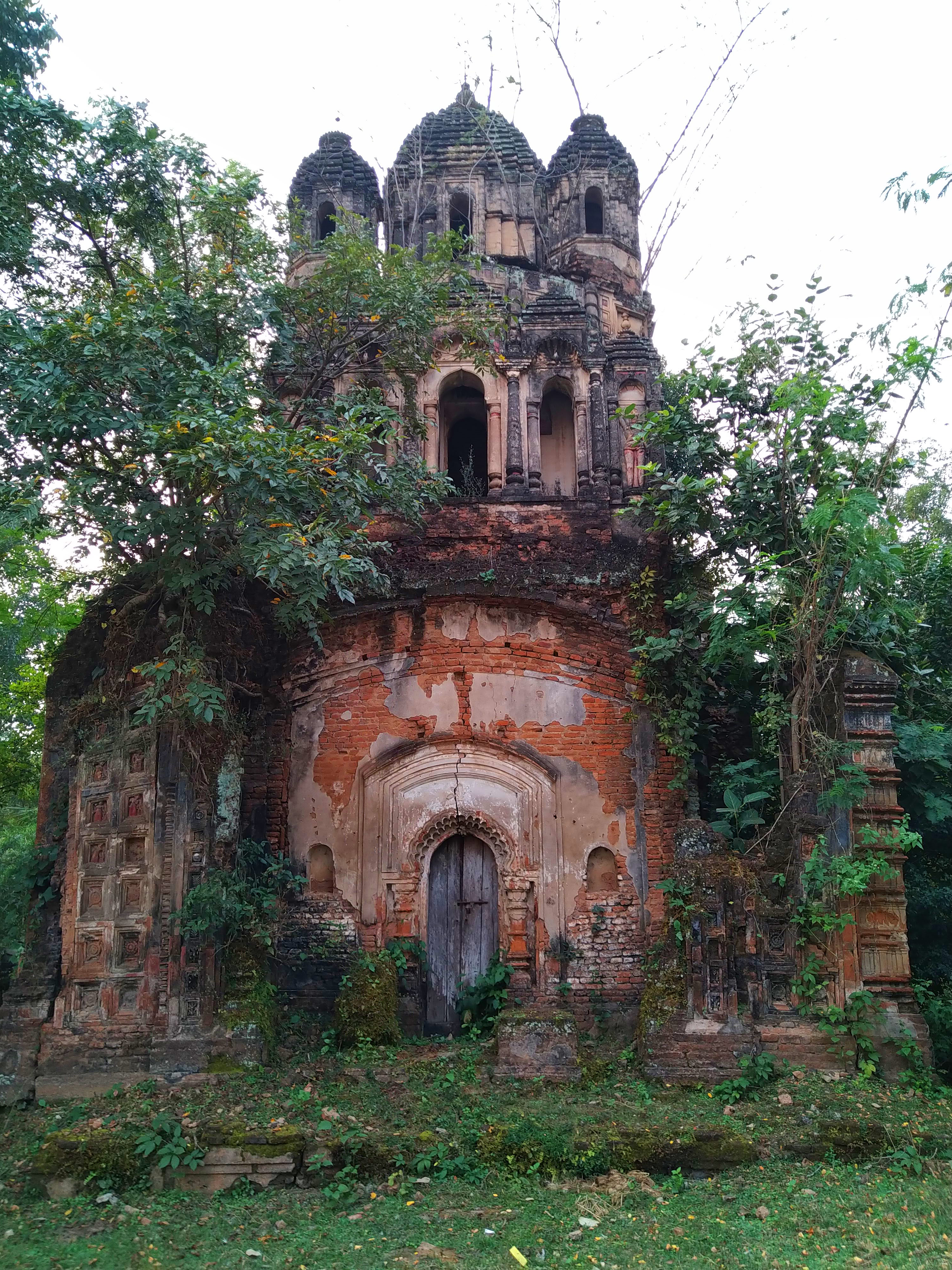
Nava-ratna Radha Rasikraya temple at Lalbazar, built in the 19th century

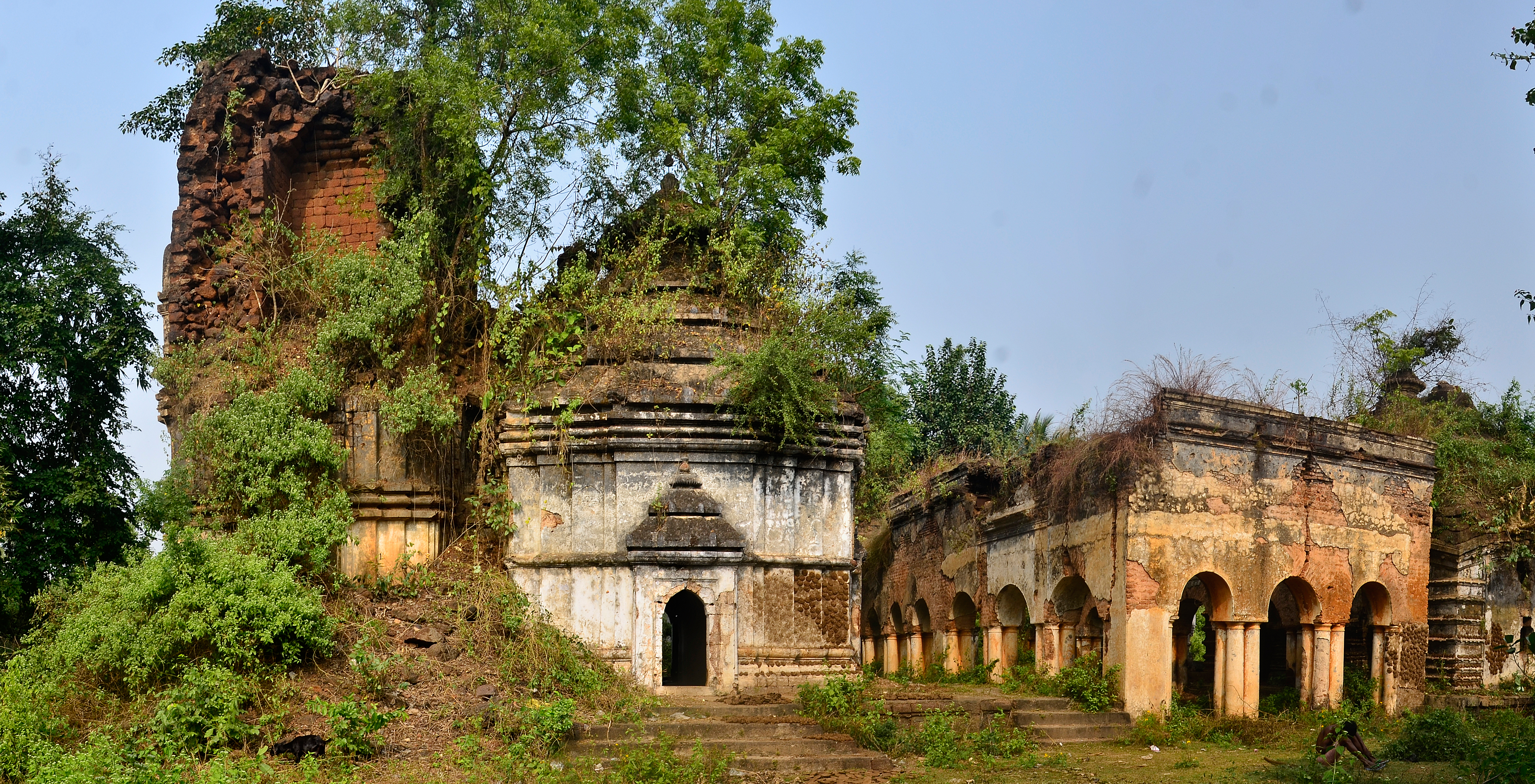
Raghunathbari Thakubari built in 1831 by Maharaja Tej Chandra of Burdwan

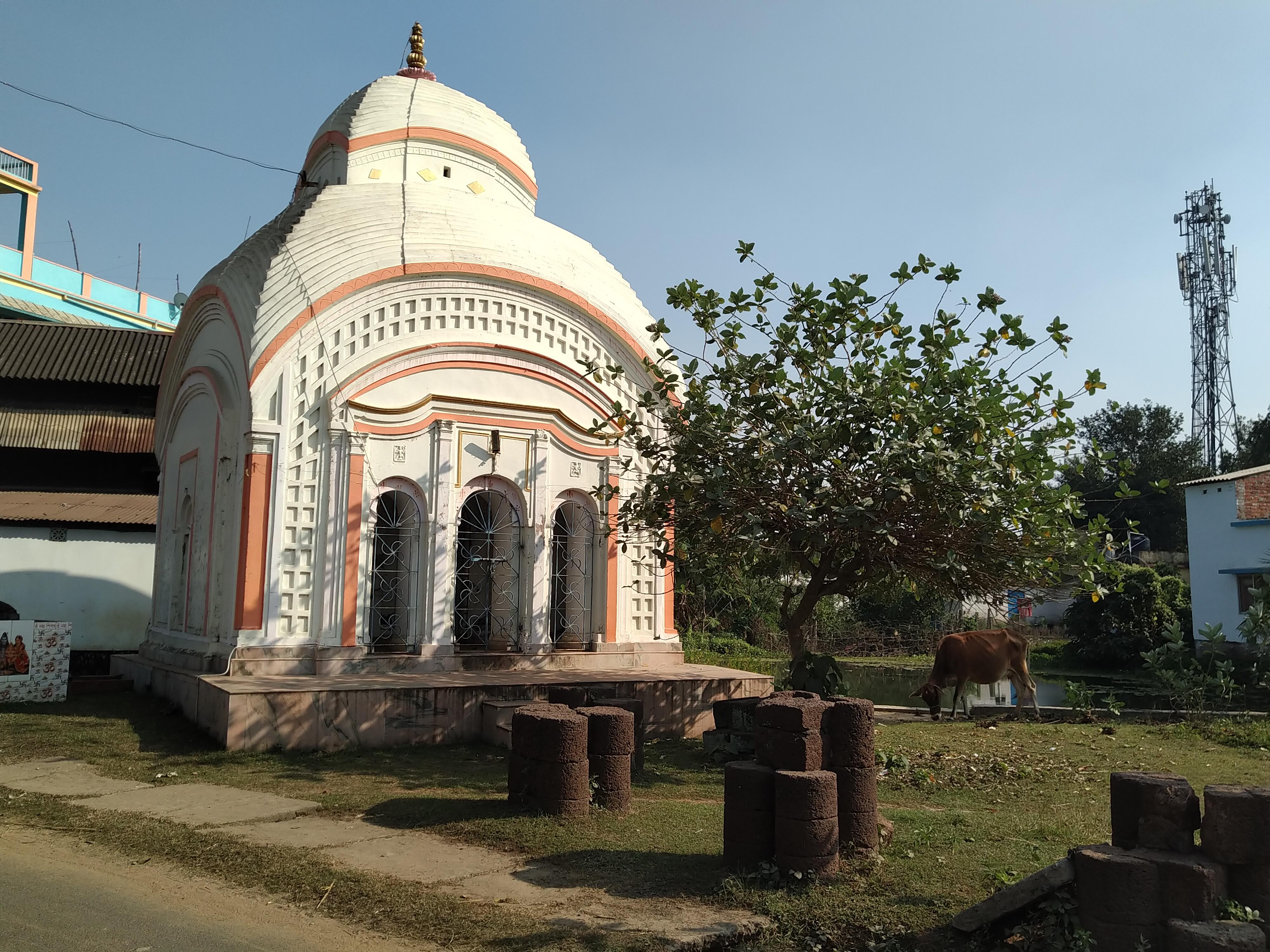
At-chala Shantinath Shiva temple at Gosaibazar

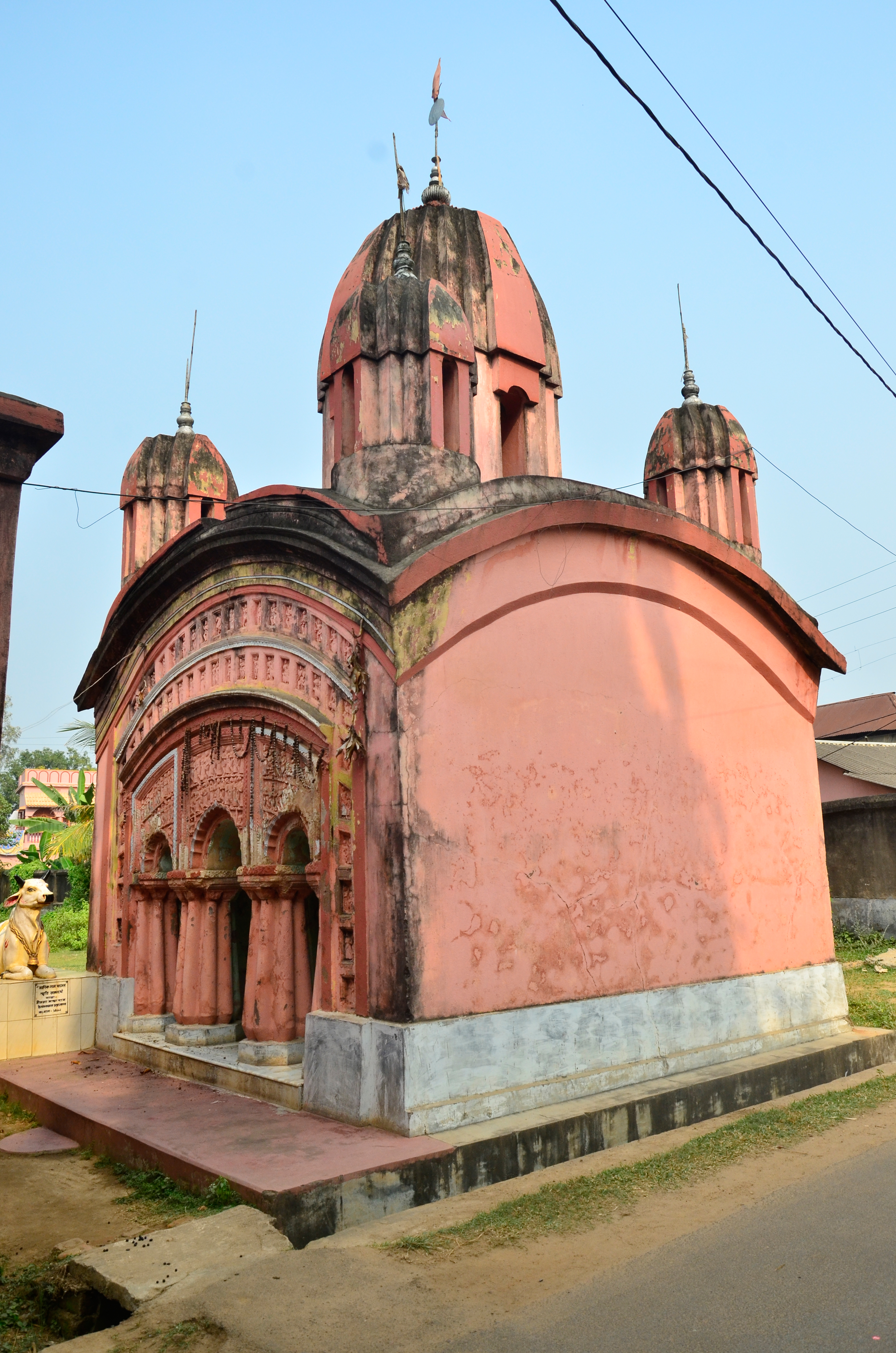
Pancha-ratna Santinath Shiva temple at Ilambazar

== Notable people ==
- Ishwar Chandra Vidyasagar, scholar, social reformer and a key figure of the Bengal Renaissance, was born at Birsingha on 26 September 1820.

== See also ==
- Malleswara Shiva Temple – one of the oldest temples in Chandrakona
- Chandrakona Jorbangla Temple - built in the 17th century it is one of the earliest Jorbangla temples in Bengal
