= Manirampur =

- Census Town
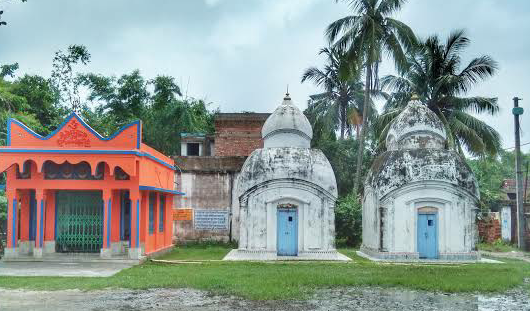
- Raksha kali Temple, Monirampur

- Location in West Bengal, India Manirampur (India)
- Coordinates: 22.7456608°N 88.2288799°E
- Country: India
- State: West Bengal
- District: Hooghly
- Nearest City: Serampore

Population (2011)
  - Total: 7,428

Languages
  - Official: Bengali, English
- Time zone: UTC+5:30 (IST)
- PIN: 712306
- Vehicle registration: WB
- Lok Sabha constituency: Serampore
- Vidhan Sabha constituency: Chanditala
- Website: wb.gov.in

Manirampur is a census town in Chanditala I CD Block in Srirampore subdivision of Hooghly district in the state of West Bengal, India.

== Geography ==
Map of Gangadharpur GP showing Mouzas

Cities and towns in Chanditala I, Chanditala II and Jangipara CD Blocks in Srirampore subdivision in Hooghly district
M: municipal city/ town, CT: census town, R: rural/ urban centre,
Owing to space constraints in the small map, the actual locations in a larger map may vary slightly

=== Location ===
Manirampur is located at: 22°44′44″N 88°13′44″E

Gangadharpur, Manirampur, Masat, Jangalpara, Dudhkalmi, Nababpur, Bhagabatipur, Kumirmora and Ramanathpur form a cluster of census towns in Chanditala I CD Block.

=== Urbanisation ===
Srirampore subdivision is the most urbanized of the subdivisions in Hooghly district. 73.13% of the population in the subdivision is urban and 26.88% is rural. The subdivision has 6 municipalities and 34 census towns. The municipalities are: Uttarpara Kotrung Municipality, Konnagar Municipality, Serampore Municipality, Baidyabati Municipality, Rishra Municipality and Dankuni Municipality. Amongst the CD Blocks in the subdivision, Uttarapara Serampore (census towns shown in a separate map) had 76% urban population, Chanditala I 42%, Chanditala II 69% and Jangipara 7% (census towns shown in the map above). All places marked in the map are linked in the larger full screen map.

=== Gram panchayat ===
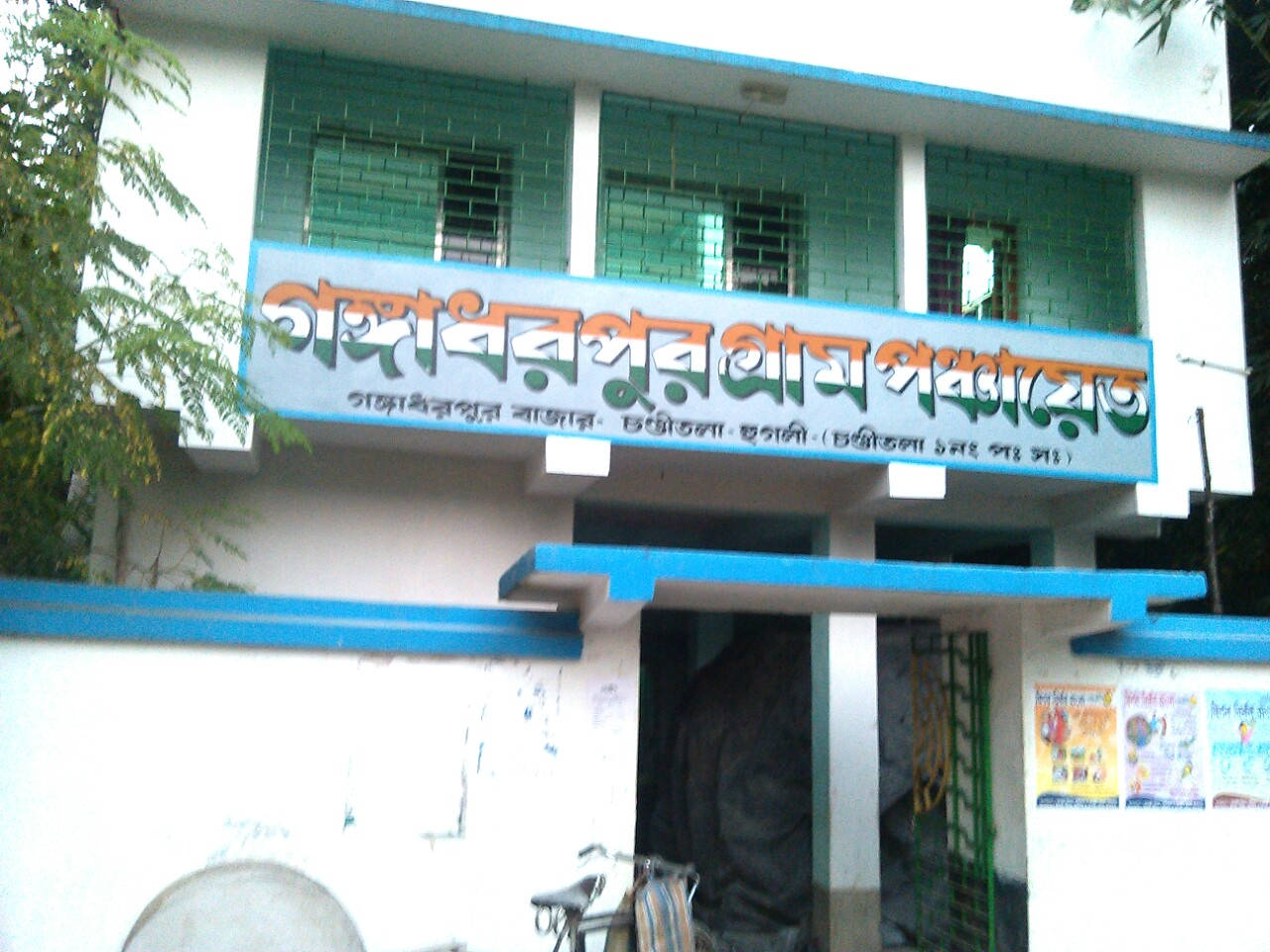
Gangadharpur Gram panchayat

Villages and census towns in Gangadharpur gram panchayat are: Bankrishnapur, Gangadharpur, Malipukur and Manirampur.

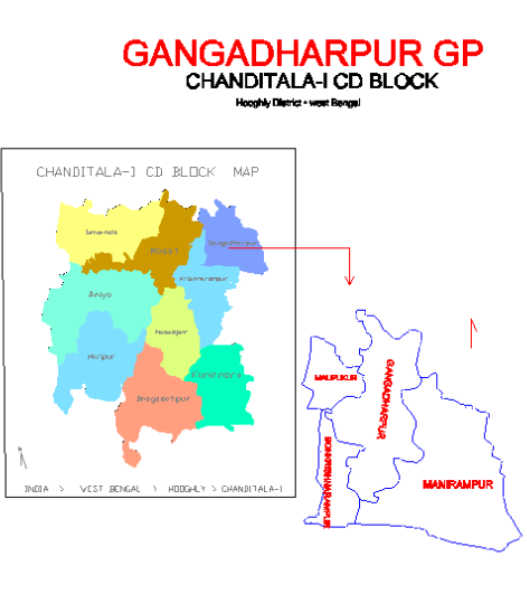
Map of Gangadharpur GP

Market: Ganngadharpur Bazar, Hajaghata, Manirampur.

== Demographics ==
As per 2011 Census of India Manirampur had a total population of 7,428 of which 3,706 (50%) were males and 3,722 (50%) were females. Population below 6 years was 679. The total number of literates in Manirampur was 5,381 (79.73% of the population over 6 years).

=== Dankuni Urban Agglomeration ===
As per the 2011 census, Dankuni Urban Agglomeration includes: Dankuni (M), Purba Tajpur (CT), Kharsarai (CT), Begampur (CT), Chikrand (CT), Pairagachha (CT), Barijhati (CT), Garalgachha (CT), Krishnapur (CT), Baruipara (CT), Borai (CT), Nawapara (CT), Basai (CT), Gangadharpur (CT), Manirampur (CT), Janai (CT), Kapashanria (CT), Jaykrishnapur (CT), Tisa (CT), Baksa (CT), Panchghara (CT) and Naiti (CT).

== Transport ==
Baruipara railway station is the nearest railway station on Howrah-Bardhaman chord line, which is a part of the Kolkata Suburban Railway system.
