= Kharsarai =

Kharsarai খরসরাই
- Census Town
- Location in West Bengal, India Kharsarai (India)
- Coordinates: 22.744947°N 88.247493°E
- Country: India
- State: West Bengal
- District: Hooghly

Population (2011)
  - Total: 6,247

Languages
  - Official: Bengali, English
- Time zone: UTC+5:30 (IST)
- Postal code: 712304
- Vehicle registration: WB
- Website: wb.gov.in

Kharsarai is a census town in Chanditala II CD Block in Srirampore subdivision of Hooghly district in the Indian state of West Bengal.

== Geography ==
Cities and towns in Chanditala I, Chanditala II and Jangipara CD Blocks in Srirampore subdivision in Hooghly district
M: municipal city/ town, CT: census town, R: rural/ urban centre,
Owing to space constraints in the small map, the actual locations in a larger map may vary slightly

=== Location ===
Kharsarai is located at 22.74494°N 88.24749°E.

Kharsarai, Tisa, Kapashanria, Jaykrishnapur, Purba Tajpur, Begampur, Baksa, Panchghara, Chikrand, Janai, Pairagachha, Naiti, Barijhati, Garalgachha and Krishnapur, all the census towns form a series from the northern part of Chanditala II CD Block to its southern part. The only municipality in the area, Dankuni, located outside the CD Block, occupies the south-east corner of the entire cluster.

=== Urbanisation ===
Srirampore subdivision is the most urbanized of the subdivisions in Hooghly district. 73.13% of the population in the subdivision is urban and 26.88% is rural. The subdivision has 6 municipalities and 34 census towns. The municipalities are: Uttarpara Kotrung Municipality, Konnagar Municipality, Serampore Municipality, Baidyabati Municipality, Rishra Municipality and Dankuni Municipality. Amongst the CD Blocks in the subdivision, Uttarapara Serampore (census towns shown in a separate map) had 76% urban population, Chanditala I 42%, Chanditala II 69% and Jangipara 7% (census towns shown in the map above). All places marked in the map are linked in the larger full screen map.

== Demographics ==
As per 2011 Census of India, Kharsarai had a total population of 6,247 of which 3,145 (50%) were males and 3,102 (50%) were females. Population below 6 years was 591. The total number of literates in Kharsarai was 4,675 (82.66% of the population over 6 years).

As of 2001 India census, Kharsarai had a population of 5850. Males constitute 51% of the population and females 49%. Kharsarai has an average literacy rate of 67%, higher than the national average of 59.5%: male literacy is 73%, and female literacy is 62%. In Kharsarai, 11% of the population is under 6 years of age. The occupation of most of the people of Kharsarai is related to weaving.

=== Dankuni Urban Agglomeration ===
As per the 2011 census, Dankuni Urban Agglomeration includes: Dankuni (M), Purba Tajpur (CT), Kharsarai (CT), Begampur (CT), Chikrand (CT), Pairagachha (CT), Barijhati (CT), Garalgachha (CT), Krishnapur (CT), Baruipara (CT), Borai (CT), Nawapara (CT), Basai (CT), Gangadharpur (CT), Manirampur (CT), Janai (CT), Kapashanria (CT), Jaykrishnapur (CT), Tisa (CT), Baksa (CT), Panchghara (CT) and Naiti (CT).

== Civic Administration ==
The civic administration of Kharsarai is overseen by the Begampur Gram Panchayat, which is responsible for providing basic civic amenities and services to the residents of the village.

== Transport ==
The nearest railway station, Begampur railway station is 23 kilometres (14 mi) from Howrah on the Howrah-Bardhaman chord line and is a part of the Kolkata Suburban Railway system.
