= Nawapara =

- Census Town
- Location in West Bengal, India Nawapara (India)
- Coordinates: 22.709139°N 88.327361°E
- Country: India
- State: West Bengal
- District: Hooghly

Population (2011)
  - Total: 7,262

Languages
  - Official: Bengali, English
- Time zone: UTC+5:30 (IST)
- Telephone code: +91 33
- Vehicle registration: WB
- Lok Sabha constituency: Srerampur
- Vidhan Sabha constituency: Sreerampur
- Website: hooghly.gov.in

Nawapara is a census town in Sreerampur Uttarpara CD Block in Srirampore subdivision of Hooghly district in the Indian state of West Bengal.

== Geography ==
Cities and towns in the Sreerampur Uttarpara CD Block in Srirampore subdivision in Hooghly district
M: municipal city/ town, CT: census town,
Owing to space constraints in the small map, the actual locations in a larger map may vary slightly

=== Location ===
Nawapara is located at 22.709139°N 88.327361°E

Rishra (CT), Bamunari, Nawapara, Nabagram Colony, Kanaipur, Basai and Raghunathpur (PS-Dankuni) form a cluster of census towns on the eastern side of the series of statutory towns/ cities – Rishra, Konnagar and Uttarpara.

=== Urbanisation ===
Srirampore subdivision is the most urbanized of the subdivisions in Hooghly district. 73.13% of the population in the subdivision is urban and 26.88% is rural. The subdivision has 6 municipalities and 34 census towns. The municipalities are: Uttarpara Kotrung Municipality, Konnagar Municipality, Serampore Municipality, Baidyabati Municipality, Rishra Municipality and Dankuni Municipality. Amongst the CD Blocks in the subdivision, Uttarapara Serampore (census towns shown in the map alongside) had 76% urban population, Chanditala I 42%, Chanditala II 69% and Jangipara 7% (census towns in the last 3 CD Blocks are shown in a separate map). All places marked in the map are linked in the larger full screen map.

== Demographics ==
As per 2011 Census of India Nawapara had a total population of 7,262 of which 3,725 (51%) were males and 3,537 (49%) were females. Population below 6 years was 670. The total number of literates in Nawapara was 5,916 (89.75% of the population over 6 years).

=== Dankuni Urban Agglomeration ===
As per the 2011 census, Dankuni Urban Agglomeration includes: Dankuni (M), Purba Tajpur (CT), Kharsarai (CT), Begampur (CT), Chikrand (CT), Pairagachha (CT), Barijhati (CT), Garalgachha (CT), Krishnapur (CT), Baruipara (CT), Borai (CT), Nawapara (CT), Basai (CT), Gangadharpur (CT), Manirampur (CT), Janai (CT), Kapashanria (CT), Jaykrishnapur (CT), Tisa (CT), Baksa (CT), Panchghara (CT) and Naiti (CT).

== Transport ==
Konnagar railway station on the Howrah-Bardhaman main line is the nearest railway station.
