= Kapashanria =

- Census Town
- Location in West Bengal, India Kapashanria (India)
- Coordinates: 22.7558°N 88.2669°E
- Country: India
- State: West Bengal
- District: Hooghly

Population (2011)
  - Total: 5,148

Languages
  - Official: Bengali, English
- Time zone: UTC+5:30 (IST)
- Vehicle registration: WB
- Lok Sabha constituency: Hooghly
- Vidhan Sabha constituency: Singur
- Website: wb.gov.in

Kapashanria is a census town in Chanditala II CD Block in Srirampore subdivision of Hooghly district in the state of West Bengal, India.

== Geography ==
Cities and towns in Chanditala I, Chanditala II and Jangipara CD Blocks in Srirampore subdivision in Hooghly district
M: municipal city/ town, CT: census town, R: rural/ urban centre,
Owing to space constraints in the small map, the actual locations in a larger map may vary slightly

=== Location ===
Kapashanria is located at 22°45′21″N 88°16′01″E . It is located in the Chanditall–II community development block under the Srirampore subdivision of the Hooghly district. Chanditala police station serves this town.

Kharsarai, Tisa, Kapashanria, Jaykrishnapur, Purba Tajpur, Begampur, Baksa, Panchghara, Chikrand, Janai, Pairagachha, Naiti, Barijhati, Garalgachha and Krishnapur, all the census towns form a series from the northern part of Chanditala II CD Block to its southern part. The only municipality in the area, Dankuni, located outside the CD Block, occupies the south-east corner of the entire cluster.

=== Urbanisation ===
Srirampore subdivision is the most urbanized of the subdivisions in Hooghly district. 73.13% of the population in the subdivision is urban and 26.88% is rural. The subdivision has 6 municipalities and 34 census towns. The municipalities are: Uttarpara Kotrung Municipality, Konnagar Municipality, Serampore Municipality, Baidyabati Municipality, Rishra Municipality and Dankuni Municipality. Amongst the CD Blocks in the subdivision, Uttarapara Serampore (census towns shown in a separate map) had 76% urban population, Chanditala I 42%, Chanditala II 69% and Jangipara 7% (census towns shown in the map above). All places marked in the map are linked in the larger full screen map.

=== Gram panchayat ===
Villages and census towns in Kapasaria gram panchayat are: Kapashanria, Okardaha, Sahana, Sanka and Tisa.

== Demographics ==
As per 2011 Census of India, Kapashanria had a total population of 5,148 of which 2,543 (49%) were males and 2,605 (51%) were females. Population below 6 years was 504. The total number of literates in Kapashanria was 3,594 (77.39% of the population over 6 years).

=== Dankuni Urban Agglomeration ===
As per the 2011 census, Dankuni Urban Agglomeration includes: Dankuni (M), Purba Tajpur (CT), Kharsarai (CT), Begampur (CT), Chikrand (CT), Pairagachha (CT), Barijhati (CT), Garalgachha (CT), Krishnapur (CT), Baruipara (CT), Borai (CT), Nawapara (CT), Basai (CT), Gangadharpur (CT), Manirampur (CT), Janai (CT), Kapashanria (CT), Jaykrishnapur (CT), Tisa (CT), Baksa (CT), Panchghara (CT) and Naiti (CT).

== Transport ==
The nearest railway station, Begampur railway station is 23 kilometres (14 mi) from Howrah on the Howrah-Bardhaman chord line and is a part of the Kolkata Suburban Railway system.

It is on NH 19 (old numbering NH 2)/ Durgapur Expressway.
