= Baksa, Hooghly =

Baksa
- Census Town
- Location in West Bengal, India Baksa (India)
- Coordinates: 22.7237°N 88.2407°E
- Country: India
- State: West Bengal
- District: Hooghly

Population (2011)
  - Total: 6,432

Languages
  - Official: Bengali, English
- Time zone: UTC+5:30 (IST)
- Vehicle registration: WB
- Lok Sabha constituency: Serampore
- Vidhan Sabha constituency: Chanditala
- Website: wb.gov.in

Baksa is a census town in Chanditala II CD Block in Srirampore subdivision of Hooghly district in the state of West Bengal, India.

== Geography ==
Cities and towns in Chanditala I, Chanditala II and Jangipara CD Blocks in Srirampore subdivision in Hooghly district
M: municipal city/ town, CT: census town, R: rural/ urban centre,
Owing to space constraints in the small map, the actual locations in a larger map may vary slightly

=== Location ===
Baksa is located at 22.7238°N 88.2407°E.

Kharsarai, Tisa, Kapashanria, Jaykrishnapur, Purba Tajpur, Begampur, Baksa, Panchghara, Chikrand, Janai, Pairagachha, Naiti, Barijhati, Garalgachha and Krishnapur, all the census towns form a series from the northern part of Chanditala II CD Block to its southern part. The only municipality in the area, Dankuni, located outside the CD Block, occupies the south-east corner of the entire cluster.

=== Urbanisation ===
Srirampore subdivision is the most urbanized of the subdivisions in Hooghly district. 73.13% of the population in the subdivision is urban and 26.88% is rural. The subdivision has 6 municipalities and 34 census towns. The municipalities are: Uttarpara Kotrung Municipality, Konnagar Municipality, Serampore Municipality, Baidyabati Municipality, Rishra Municipality and Dankuni Municipality. Amongst the CD Blocks in the subdivision, Uttarapara Serampore (census towns shown in a separate map) had 76% urban population, Chanditala I 42%, Chanditala II 69% and Jangipara 7% (census towns shown in the map above). All places marked in the map are linked in the larger full screen map.

=== Gram panchayat ===
Villages and census towns in Baksa gram panchayat are: Baksa, Duttapur, Khoragari and Madhabpur.

== Demographics ==
As per 2011 Census of India Baksa had a total population of 6,432 of which 3,196 (50%) were males and 3,236 (50%) were females. Population below 6 years was 600. The total number of literates in Baksa was 4,767 (81.74% of the population over 6 years).

=== Dankuni Urban Agglomeration ===
As per the 2011 census, Dankuni Urban Agglomeration includes: Dankuni (M), Purba Tajpur (CT), Kharsarai (CT), Begampur (CT), Chikrand (CT), Pairagachha (CT), Barijhati (CT), Garalgachha (CT), Krishnapur (CT), Baruipara (CT), Borai (CT), Nawapara (CT), Basai (CT), Gangadharpur (CT), Manirampur (CT), Janai (CT), Kapashanria (CT), Jaykrishnapur (CT), Tisa (CT), Baksa (CT), Panchghara (CT) and Naiti (CT).

== Transport ==
The nearest railway station, Janai Road railway station, is 21 kilometres (13 mi) from Howrah on the Howrah-Bardhaman chord line and is a part of the Kolkata Suburban Railway system.

== Education ==
Baksha Bindhyabasini Niharbala Vidyalaya is a coeducational higher secondary school at Baksha. It has arrangements for teaching Bengali, English, Sanskrit, history, geography, philosophy, mathematics and education.
