= Janai, Hooghly =

Janai
- Census Town
- Location in West Bengal, India Janai (India)
- Coordinates: 22.7157°N 88.2426°E
- Country: India
- State: West Bengal
- District: Hooghly

Population (2011)
  - Total: 12,837

Languages
  - Official: Bengali, English
- Time zone: UTC+5:30 (IST)
- PIN: 712304
- Vehicle registration: WB
- Lok Sabha constituency: Serampore
- Vidhan Sabha constituency: Chanditala
- Website: wb.gov.in

Janai is a Census Town and a Gram Panchayat in the Kolkata Metropolitan Area of Hooghly district in the Indian state of West Bengal. It is a part of area covered by Kolkata Metropolitan Development Authority (KMDA). It is a part of Chanditala-II Development Block.

Monohara is a famous, heart-shaped Bengali sandesh that originated in Janai. It is known for its soft, cardamom-scented chana center coated in a crunchy, caramelized sugar shell. It was also nominated for GI tag in 2023.

== Demographics ==
As per 2011 Census of India, Janai had a total population of 12,837 of which 6,423 (50%) were males and 6,414 (50%) were females. Population below 6 years was 1,203. The total number of literates in Janai was 10,190 (87.59% of the population over 6 years).

=== Dankuni Urban Agglomeration ===
As per the 2011 census, Dankuni Urban Agglomeration includes: Dankuni (M), Purba Tajpur (CT), Kharsarai (CT), Begampur (CT), Chikrand (CT), Pairagachha (CT), Barijhati (CT), Garalgachha (CT), Krishnapur (CT), Baruipara (CT), Borai (CT), Nawapara (CT), Basai (CT), Gangadharpur (CT), Manirampur (CT), Janai (CT), Kapashanria (CT), Jaykrishnapur (CT), Tisa (CT), Baksa (CT), Panchghara (CT) and Naiti (CT).

== Education ==
Janai Training High School Established in Year : 1850 Management : Dept. of Education Coeducation: Co-Educational. Medium of Instruction: Bengali.

Bhaduri Mahasaya, revered as Maharishi Nagendranath Bhaduri, once guided young minds as headmaster of Janai Training High School. Bhaduri Mahasaya was also known as "The Levitating Saint" due to accounts of his levitation during intense pranayama practices, as described by Paramahansa Yogananda in his Autobiography of a Yogi.

== Geography ==
Cities and towns in Chanditala I, Chanditala II and Jangipara CD Blocks in Srirampore subdivision in Hooghly district
M: municipal city/ town, CT: census town, R: rural/ urban centre,
Owing to space constraints in the small map, the actual locations in a larger map may vary slightly

=== Location ===
Janai is located at 22.7157°N 88.2426°E.

Kharsarai, Tisa, Kapashanria, Jaykrishnapur, Purba Tajpur, Begampur, Baksa, Panchghara, Chikrand, Janai, Pairagachha, Naiti, Barijhati, Garalgachha and Krishnapur, all the census towns form a series from the northern part of Chanditala II CD Block to its southern part. The only municipality in the area, Dankuni, located outside the CD Block, occupies the south-east corner of the entire cluster.

=== Urbanisation ===
Srirampore subdivision is the most urbanized of the subdivisions in Hooghly district. 73.13% of the population in the subdivision is urban and 26.88% is rural. The subdivision has 6 municipalities and 34 census towns. The municipalities are: Uttarpara Kotrung Municipality, Konnagar Municipality, Serampore Municipality, Baidyabati Municipality, Rishra Municipality and Dankuni Municipality. Amongst the CD Blocks in the subdivision, Uttarapara Serampore (census towns shown in a separate map) had 76% urban population, Chanditala I 42%, Chanditala II 69% and Jangipara 7% (census towns shown in the map above). All places marked in the map are linked in the larger full screen map.

=== Gram panchayat ===
Villages and census towns in Janai gram panchayat are: Jagannathbati and Janai.

== Healthcare ==
Janai Baksa Primary Health Centre functions with 10 beds.

== Transport ==
Janai Road railway station is 21 kilometres (13 mi) from Howrah on the Howrah-Bardhaman chord line and is part of the Kolkata Suburban Railway system.
