= Krishnapur, West Bengal =

Krishnapur
- Census Town
- Location in West Bengal, India Krishnapur (India)
- Coordinates: 22.67°N 88.26°E
- Country: India
- State: West Bengal
- District: Hooghly

Population (2011)
  - Total: 8,205

Languages
  - Official: Bengali, English
- Time zone: UTC+5:30 (IST)
- ISO 3166 code: IN-WB
- Vehicle registration: WB
- Website: wb.gov.in

Krishnapur is a census town in Chanditala II CD Block in Srirampore subdivision of Hooghly district in the Indian state of West Bengal.

== Geography ==
Cities and towns in Chanditala I, Chanditala II and Jangipara CD Blocks in Srirampore subdivision in Hooghly district
M: municipal city/ town, CT: census town, R: rural/ urban centre,
Owing to space constraints in the small map, the actual locations in a larger map may vary slightly

=== Location ===
Krishnapur is located at 22.67°N 88.26°E

Kharsarai, Tisa, Kapashanria, Jaykrishnapur, Purba Tajpur, Begampur, Baksa, Panchghara, Chikrand, Janai, Pairagachha, Naiti, Barijhati, Garalgachha and Krishnapur, all the census towns form a series from the northern part of Chanditala II CD Block to its southern part. The only municipality in the area, Dankuni, located outside the CD Block, occupies the south-east corner of the entire cluster.

=== Urbanisation ===
Srirampore subdivision is the most urbanized of the subdivisions in Hooghly district. 73.13% of the population in the subdivision is urban and 26.88% is rural. The subdivision has 6 municipalities and 34 census towns. The municipalities are: Uttarpara Kotrung Municipality, Konnagar Municipality, Serampore Municipality, Baidyabati Municipality, Rishra Municipality and Dankuni Municipality. Amongst the CD Blocks in the subdivision, Uttarapara Serampore (census towns shown in a separate map) had 76% urban population, Chanditala I 42%, Chanditala II 69% and Jangipara 7% (census towns shown in the map above). All places marked in the map are linked in the larger full screen map.

=== Gram panchayat ===
The villages and census towns in Garalgachha gram panchayat are: Eklakhi, Garalgachha and Krishnapur

== Demographics ==
As per 2011 Census of India, Krishnapur had a total population of 8,205 of which 4,115 (50%) were males and 4,090 (50%) were females. Population below 6 years was 809. The total number of literates in Krishnapur was 6,164 (83.34% of the population over 6 years).

As of 2001 India census, Krishnapur had a population of 6,676. Males constituted 50% of the population and females 50%. Krishnapur had an average literacy rate of 69%, higher than the national average of 59.5%: male literacy was 73%, and female literacy was 65%. In Krishnapur, 12% of the population was under 6 years of age.

=== Dankuni Urban Agglomeration ===
As per the 2011 census, Dankuni Urban Agglomeration includes: Dankuni (M), Purba Tajpur (CT), Kharsarai (CT), Begampur (CT), Chikrand (CT), Pairagachha (CT), Barijhati (CT), Garalgachha (CT), Krishnapur (CT), Baruipara (CT), Borai (CT), Nawapara (CT), Basai (CT), Gangadharpur (CT), Manirampur (CT), Janai (CT), Kapashanria (CT), Jaykrishnapur (CT), Tisa (CT), Baksa (CT), Panchghara (CT) and Naiti (CT).

== Transport ==
The nearest railway station, Dankuni Junction railway station, is 15 kilometres (9.3 mi) from Howrah on the Howrah-Bardhaman chord line and is a part of the Kolkata Suburban Railway system.

Krishnapur is on the State Highway 15.
