= Garalgachha =

- Census Town
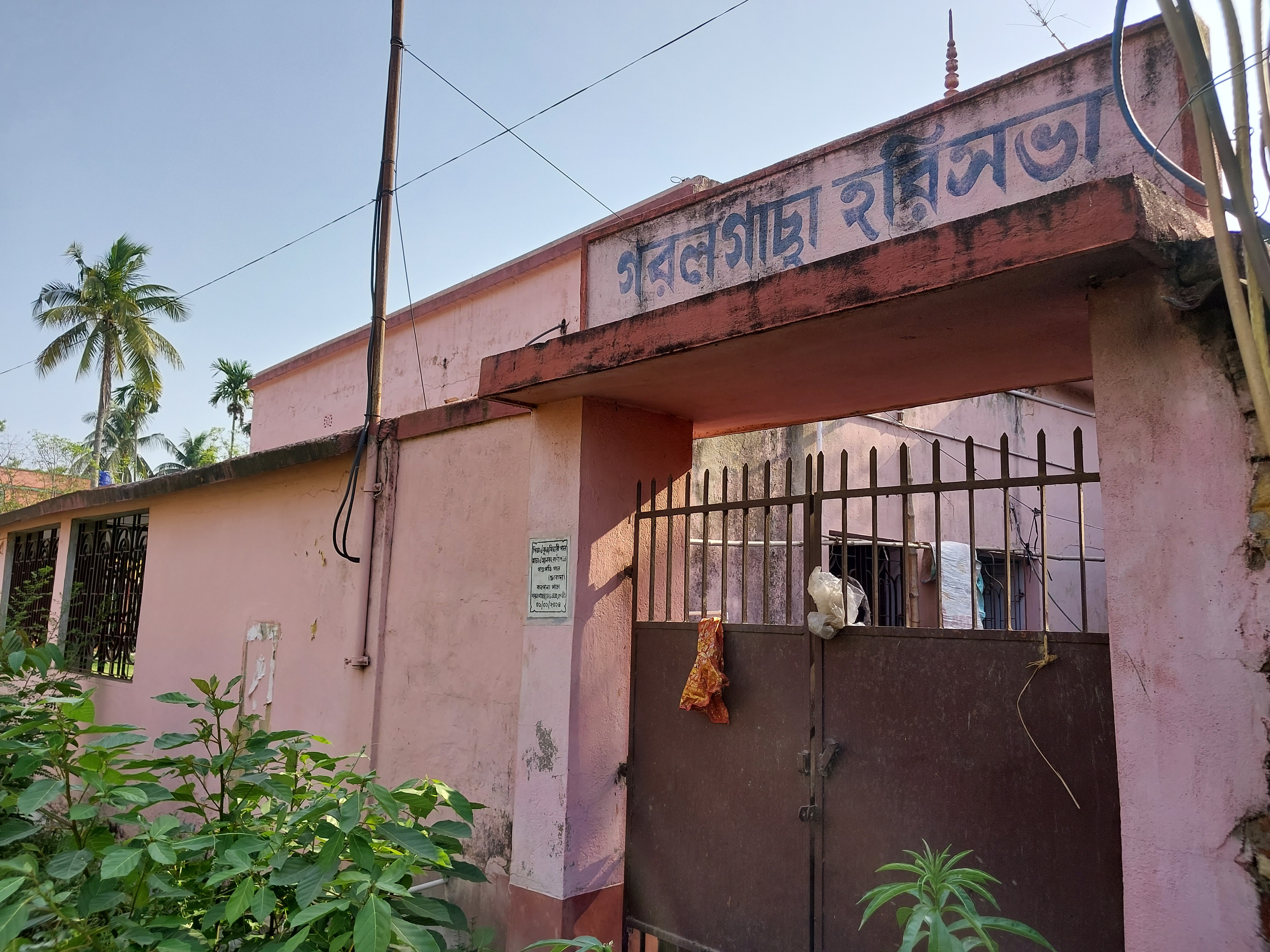
- Garalgachha Harisabha

- Location in West Bengal, India Garalgachha (India)
- Coordinates: 22.68°N 88.27°E
- Country: India
- State: West Bengal
- District: Hooghly

Population (2011)
  - Total: 5,411

Languages
  - Official: Bengali, English
- Time zone: UTC+5:30 (IST)
- ISO 3166 code: IN-WB
- Vehicle registration: WB
- Website: wb.gov.in

Garalgachha is a census town in Chanditala II CD Block in Srirampore subdivision in Hooghly district in the state of West Bengal, India.

== Etymology ==
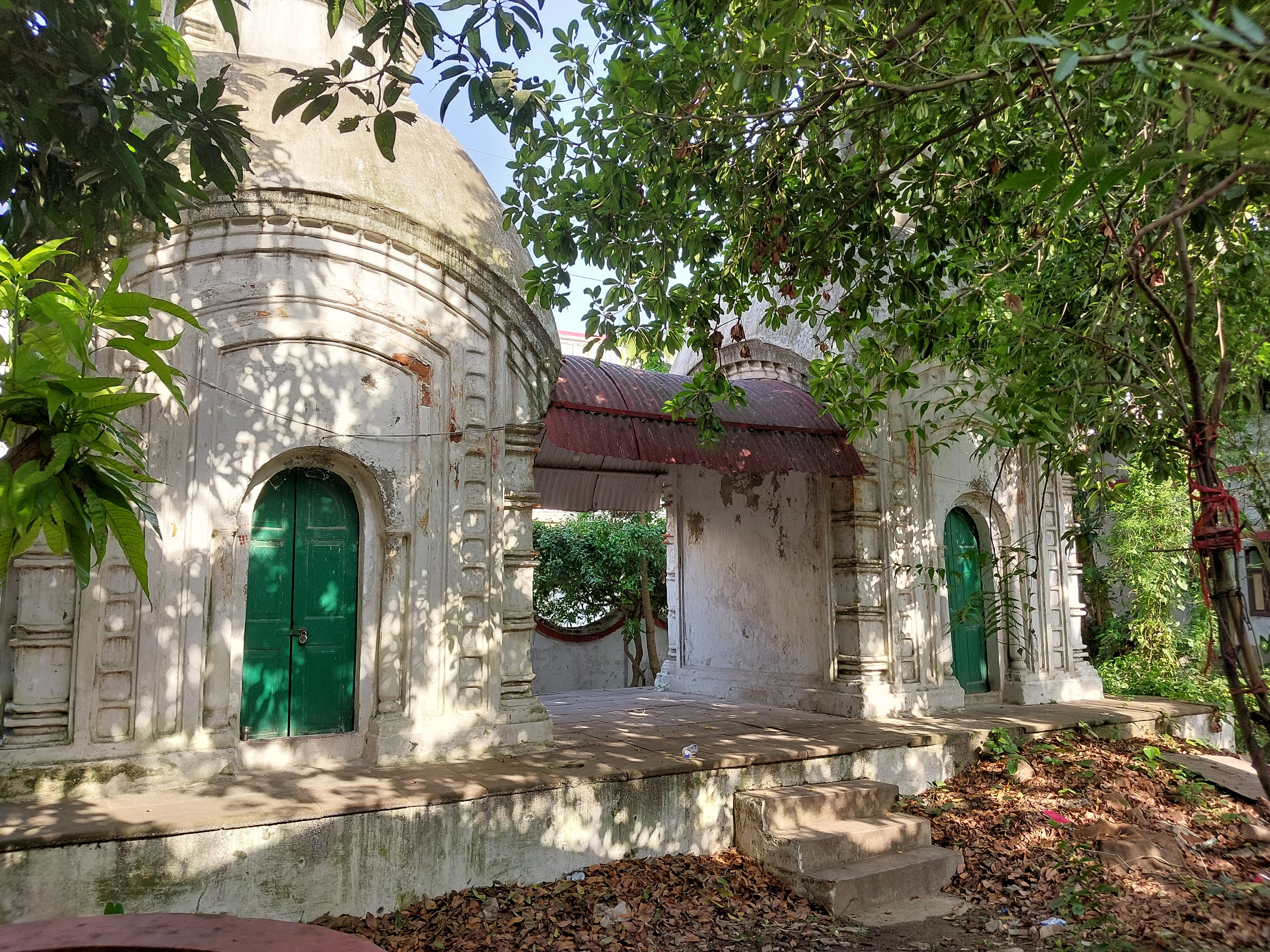
Jora Shiv Temple at Garalgacha

There are three opinions about the name of Garalgachha. One of the popular opinions is 'Garal' means poison. Lord Shiva controlled poison by keeping it at his throat. So He was called master of Garal (Garaladhipati). There is a tree (gach in Bengali) by the side of river Saraswati where the symbol of Lord Shiva exists, that tree was called as Garal (poison) gachh (tree). From this name converted the name of Garalgachha of this place.

== Geography ==
Cities and towns in Chanditala I, Chanditala II and Jangipara CD Blocks in Srirampore subdivision in Hooghly district
M: municipal city/ town, CT: census town, R: rural/ urban centre,
Owing to space constraints in the small map, the actual locations in a larger map may vary slightly

=== Location ===
Garalgachha is located at 22.68°N 88.27°E.

Kharsarai, Tisa, Kapashanria, Jaykrishnapur, Purba Tajpur, Begampur, Baksa, Panchghara, Chikrand, Janai, Pairagachha, Naiti, Barijhati, Garalgachha and Krishnapur, all the census towns form a series from the northern part of Chanditala II CD Block to its southern part. The only municipality in the area, Dankuni, located outside the CD Block, occupies the south-east corner of the entire cluster.

=== Urbanisation ===
Srirampore subdivision is the most urbanized of the subdivisions in Hooghly district. 73.13% of the population in the subdivision is urban and 26.88% is rural. The subdivision has 6 municipalities and 34 census towns. The municipalities are: Uttarpara Kotrung Municipality, Konnagar Municipality, Serampore Municipality, Baidyabati Municipality, Rishra Municipality and Dankuni Municipality. Amongst the CD Blocks in the subdivision, Uttarapara Serampore (census towns shown in a separate map) had 76% urban population, Chanditala I 42%, Chanditala II 69% and Jangipara 7% (census towns shown in the map above). All places marked in the map are linked in the larger full screen map.

=== Gram panchayat ===
Villages and census towns in Garalgachha gram panchayat are: Eklakhi, Garalgachha and Krishnapur

== Demographics ==
As per 2011 Census of India Garalgachha had a total population of 5,411 of which 2,760 (51%) were males and 2,651 (49%) were females. Population below 6 years was 347. The total number of literates in Garalgachha was 4,763 (94.06% of the population over 6 years).

As of 2001 India census, Garalgachha had a population of 4,499. Males constitute 52% of the population and females 48%. Garalgachha has an average literacy rate of 86%, higher than the national average of 59.5%: male literacy is 89%, and female literacy is 82%. In Garalgachha, 7% of the population is under 6 years of age.

=== Dankuni Urban Agglomeration ===
As per the 2011 census, Dankuni Urban Agglomeration includes: Dankuni (M), Purba Tajpur (CT), Kharsarai (CT), Begampur (CT), Chikrand (CT), Pairagachha (CT), Barijhati (CT), Garalgachha (CT), Krishnapur (CT), Baruipara (CT), Borai (CT), Nawapara (CT), Basai (CT), Gangadharpur (CT), Manirampur (CT), Janai (CT), Kapashanria (CT), Jaykrishnapur (CT), Tisa (CT), Baksa (CT), Panchghara (CT) and Naiti (CT).

== Education ==
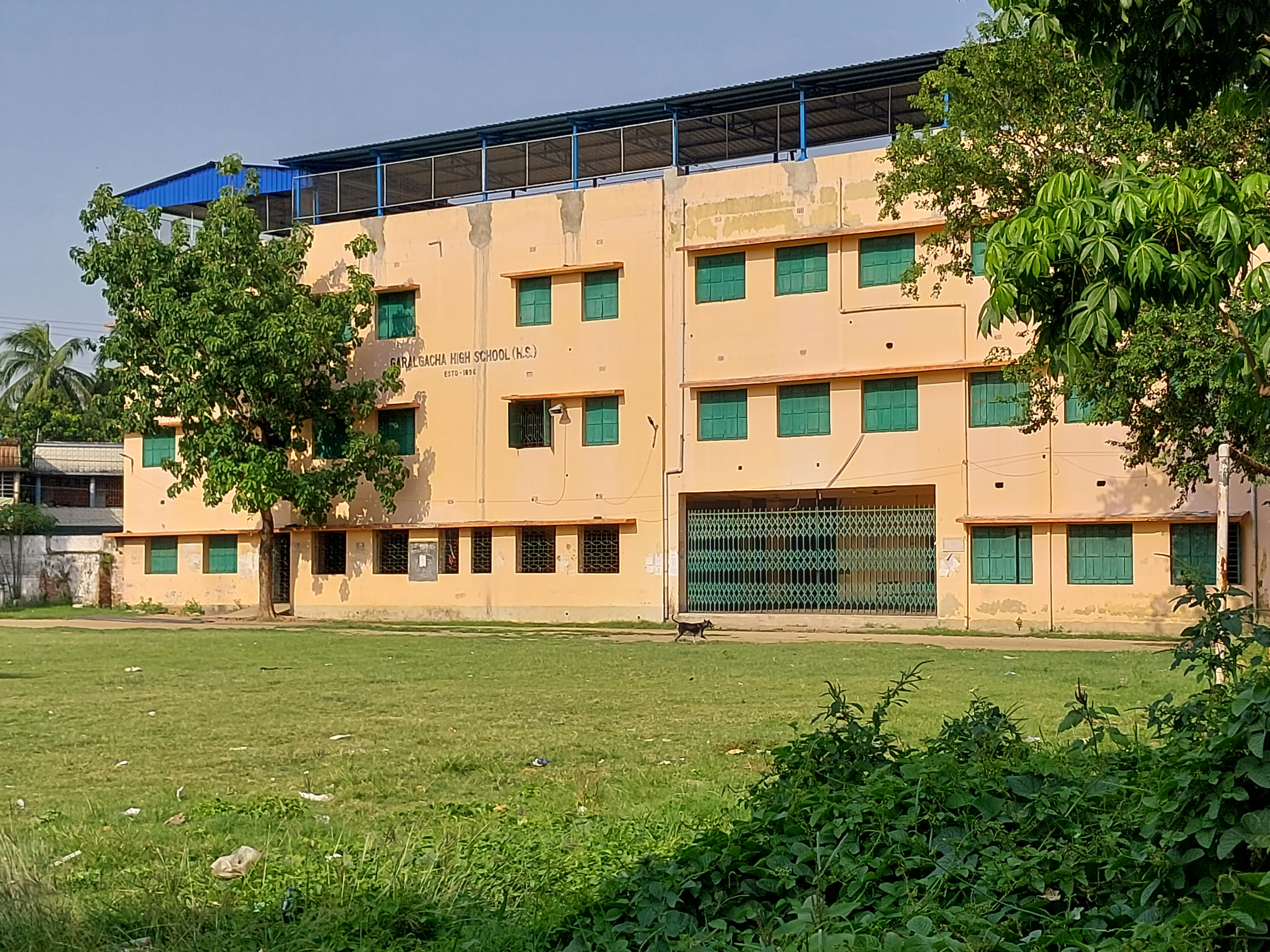
Garalgacha High School

Among major high schools in Garalgachha 'Garalgachha High School' (established 1896), 'Garalgachha Girls School' and 'Surabala Vidyapith' are there. Garalgacha High School is a coeducational higher secondary school at Garalgachha. Garalgacha Balika Vidyalaya is a girls only higher secondary school in this area.

== Transport ==
The nearest railway station, Dankuni Junction railway station is 15 kilometres (9.3 mi) from Howrah on the Howrah-Bardhaman chord line and is a part of the Kolkata Suburban Railway system.
