= Barijhati =

Barijahatty বরিজহাটি
- Census Town
- Location in West Bengal, India Barijahatty (India)
- Coordinates: 22.68624°N 88.26447°E
- Country: India
- State: West Bengal
- District: Hooghly

Government
  - Type: Local
  - Body: Panchayet

Population (2011)
  - Total: 7,136

Languages
  - Official: Bengali, English
- Time zone: UTC+5:30 (IST)
- Postal code: 712702
- Vehicle registration: WB
- Website: wb.gov.in

Barijhati is a census town in Chanditala II CD Block in Srirampore subdivision of Hooghly district, in the Indian state of West Bengal.

== History ==
On the northern side of Barijhati there was a Neel Kuthi. Neel (indigo) cultivation started in Hooghly district from 1780 A.D. Such cultivation gradually spread to other places like Bansberia, Balagarh, Melia, Khanayan, Gopiganj Rajpur, Sitapur and also Chanditala. At the time of the indigo revolt, one Englishman named Mr. Castle had been murdered in 1835 A.D at a place now known as Kuthir Para. The tank used for indigo processing is now popular as Kuthir Pukur at Barijhati. Some relics are still now visible under the water of this tank.

== Geography ==
Cities and towns in Chanditala I, Chanditala II and Jangipara CD Blocks in Srirampore subdivision in Hooghly district
M: municipal city/ town, CT: census town, R: rural/ urban centre,
Owing to space constraints in the small map, the actual locations in a larger map may vary slightly

=== Location ===
Barijhati is located at 22.68624°N 88.26447°E

Kharsarai, Tisa, Kapashanria, Jaykrishnapur, Purba Tajpur, Begampur, Baksa, Panchghara, Chikrand, Janai, Pairagachha, Naiti, Barijhati, Garalgachha and Krishnapur, all the census towns form a series from the northern part of Chanditala II CD Block to its southern part. The only municipality in the area, Dankuni, located outside the CD Block, occupies the south-east corner of the entire cluster.

=== Urbanisation ===
Srirampore subdivision is the most urbanized of the subdivisions in Hooghly district. 73.13% of the population in the subdivision is urban and 26.88% is rural. The subdivision has 6 municipalities and 34 census towns. The municipalities are: Uttarpara Kotrung Municipality, Konnagar Municipality, Serampore Municipality, Baidyabati Municipality, Rishra Municipality and Dankuni Municipality. Amongst the CD Blocks in the subdivision, Uttarapara Serampore (census towns shown in a separate map) had 76% urban population, Chanditala I 42%, Chanditala II 69% and Jangipara 7% (census towns shown in the map above). All places marked in the map are linked in the larger full screen map.

=== Gram panchayat ===
Villages and census towns in Barijhati gram panchayat are: Barijhati, Beledanga, Gokulpur, Khanpur, Makhalpara and Thero.

== Demographics ==
As per 2011 Census of India, Barijhati had a total population of 7,136 of which 3,679 (52%) were males and 3,457 (48%) were females. Population below 6 years was 518. The total number of literates in Barijhati was 5,336 (83.83% of the population over 6 years).

As of 2001 India census, Barijhati had a population of 6,400. Males constitute 51% of the population and females 49%. Barijhati has an average literacy rate of 80%, higher than the national average of 59.5%; with 54% of the males and 46% of females literate. 9% of the population is under 6 years of age.

=== Dankuni Urban Agglomeration ===
As per the 2011 census, Dankuni Urban Agglomeration includes: Dankuni (M), Purba Tajpur (CT), Kharsarai (CT), Begampur (CT), Chikrand (CT), Pairagachha (CT), Barijhati (CT), Garalgachha (CT), Krishnapur (CT), Baruipara (CT), Borai (CT), Nawapara (CT), Basai (CT), Gangadharpur (CT), Manirampur (CT), Janai (CT), Kapashanria (CT), Jaykrishnapur (CT), Tisa (CT), Baksa (CT), Panchghara (CT) and Naiti (CT).

== Transport ==
The nearest railway station, Gobra railway station is 17 kilometres (11 mi) from Howrah on the Howrah-Bardhaman chord line and is a part of the Kolkata Suburban Railway system.

Barijhati is on the State Highway 15.
