= Pairagachha =

- Census Town
- Location in West Bengal, India Pairagachha (India)
- Coordinates: 22.7134°N 88.2608°E
- Country: India
- State: West Bengal
- District: Hooghly
- Elevation: 12 m (39 ft)

Population (2011)
  - Total: 4,703

Languages
  - Official: Bengali, English
- Time zone: UTC+5:30 (IST)
- Vehicle registration: WB
- Website: wb.gov.in

Pairagachha is a census town in Chanditala II CD Block in Srirampore subdivision of Hooghly district in the Indian state of West Bengal.

== Geography ==
Cities and towns in Chanditala I, Chanditala II and Jangipara CD Blocks in Srirampore subdivision in Hooghly district
M: municipal city/ town, CT: census town, R: rural/ urban centre,
Owing to space constraints in the small map, the actual locations in a larger map may vary slightly

=== Location ===
Pairagachha is located at 22.7134°N 88.2608°E. It has an average elevation of 12 m (39 ft).

Kharsarai, Tisa, Kapashanria, Jaykrishnapur, Purba Tajpur, Begampur, Baksa, Panchghara, Chikrand, Janai, Pairagachha, Naiti, Barijhati, Garalgachha and Krishnapur, all the census towns form a series from the northern part of Chanditala II CD Block to its southern part. The only municipality in the area, Dankuni, located outside the CD Block, occupies the south-east corner of the entire cluster.

=== Urbanisation ===
Srirampore subdivision is the most urbanized of the subdivisions in Hooghly district. 73.13% of the population in the subdivision is urban and 26.88% is rural. The subdivision has 6 municipalities and 34 census towns. The municipalities are: Uttarpara Kotrung Municipality, Konnagar Municipality, Serampore Municipality, Baidyabati Municipality, Rishra Municipality and Dankuni Municipality. Amongst the CD Blocks in the subdivision, Uttarapara Serampore (census towns shown in a separate map) had 76% urban population, Chanditala I 42%, Chanditala II 69% and Jangipara 7% (census towns shown in the map above). All places marked in the map are linked in the larger full screen map.

=== Gram panchayat ===
Villages and census towns in Chanditala gram panchayat are: Bamandanga, Benipur, Chanditala, Kalachhara and Pairagachha.

== Demographics ==
As per 2011 Census of India Pairagachha had a population of 4,703 of which 2,350 (50%) were males and 2,353 (50%) females. Population below 6 years was 393. The number of literates in Pairagachha was 3,844 (89.19% of the population over 6 years).

As of 2001 India census, Pairagachha had a population of 4,350. Males constitute 50% of the population and females 50%. Pairagachha has an average literacy rate of 80%, higher than the national average of 59.5%: male literacy is 86%, and female literacy is 75%. In Pairagachha, 9% of the population is under 6 years of age.

=== Dankuni Urban Agglomeration ===
As per the 2011 census, Dankuni Urban Agglomeration includes: Dankuni (M), Purba Tajpur (CT), Kharsarai (CT), Begampur (CT), Chikrand (CT), Pairagachha (CT), Barijhati (CT), Garalgachha (CT), Krishnapur (CT), Baruipara (CT), Borai (CT), Nawapara (CT), Basai (CT), Gangadharpur (CT), Manirampur (CT), Janai (CT), Kapashanria (CT), Jaykrishnapur (CT), Tisa (CT), Baksa (CT), Panchghara (CT) and Naiti (CT).

== Transport ==
The nearest railway stations are Gobra railway station and Janai Road railway station on the Howrah-Bardhaman chord line, which is a part of the Kolkata Suburban Railway system.
