= Borai, Hooghly =

Borai
- Census Town
- Location in West Bengal, India Borai (India)
- Coordinates: 22.7715°N 88.2524°E
- Country: India
- State: West Bengal
- District: Hooghly

Population (2011)
  - Total: 6,522

Languages
  - Official: Bengali, English
- Time zone: UTC+5:30 (IST)
- Telephone code: 03212
- Vehicle registration: WB
- Lok Sabha constituency: Hooghly
- Vidhan Sabha constituency: Singur
- Website: hooghly.gov.in

Borai is a census town in Singur CD Block in Chandannagore subdivision of Hooghly district in the Indian state of West Bengal.

== Geography ==
Cities and towns in the Chandannagore subdivision and Polba Dadpur and Dhaniakhali CD Blocks of Chinsurah subdivision in Hooghly district
M: municipal corporation/ municipal city/ town, CT: census town, R: rural/ urban centre,
Owing to space constraints in the small map, the actual locations in a larger map may vary slightly

=== Location ===
Borai is located at 22.7715°N 88.2524°E.

The area is composed of flat alluvial plains that form a part of the Gangetic Delta.

=== Urbanisation ===
In Chandannagore subdivision 58.52% of the population is rural whereas, the urban population is 41.48%. Chandannagore subdivision has 1 municipal corporation, 3 municipalities and 7 census towns. The single municipal corporation is known as Chandernagore Municipal Corporation. The municipalities are Tarakeswar Municipality, Bhadreswar Municipality and Champdany Municipality. Of the three CD Blocks in Chandannagore subdivision, the Tarakeswar CD Block is wholly rural, Haripal CD Block is predominantly rural with just 1 census town, and Singur CD Block is slightly less rural with 6 census towns. Polba Dadpur and Dhaniakhali CD Blocks of Chinsurah subdivision (included in the map alongside) are wholly rural. The municipal areas are industrialised. All places marked in the map are linked in the larger full screen map.

== Demographics ==
As per 2011 Census of India Borai had a total population of 6,522 of which 3,321 (51%) were males and 3,201 (49%) were females. Population below 6 years was 570. The total number of literates in Borai was 5,010 (84.17% of the population over 6 years).

=== Dankuni Urban Agglomeration ===
As per the 2011 census, Dankuni Urban Agglomeration includes: Dankuni (M), Purba Tajpur (CT), Kharsarai (CT), Begampur (CT), Chikrand (CT), Pairagachha (CT), Barijhati (CT), Garalgachha (CT), Krishnapur (CT), Baruipara (CT), Borai (CT), Nawapara (CT), Basai (CT), Gangadharpur (CT), Manirampur (CT), Janai (CT), Kapashanria (CT), Jaykrishnapur (CT), Tisa (CT), Baksa (CT), Panchghara (CT) and Naiti (CT).

== Transport ==
The nearest railway station, Baruipara railway station is 27 kilometres (17 mi) from Howrah on the Howrah-Bardhaman chord line and is a part of the Kolkata Suburban Railway system. There is 31 Number Private Bus from Jangipara bus stand to Serampore bus stand via Furfura Sharif, Sehakhala, Banmalipur, Gangadharpur, Baruipara, Borai and Milki Badamtala.

It is close to NH 19 (old numbering NH 2)/ Durgapur Expressway.
