= Begampuri Saree =

Production area

Details
- Invented: 16th–18th centuries
- Origin place: Begampur, West Bengal, India
- Ingredients: Cotton
- Thread count: 1600-1800 (traditionally); 3400- 4000
- Length: 5.5–6.5 m (18–21 ft)
- Style: Traditional cotton saree

Status
- GI Status: Registered
- Application no.: 877
- Website: ipindia.gov.in

Begampuri Saree (Bengali: বেগমপুরী শাড়ি) or Begampuri Tant Saree is a traditional handloom saree from Begampur in West Bengal, India. Traditional Begampuri designs were Matapar and Booty with varied broadness. The main body and the border of the saree are usually of contrasting colours. It is woven in Begampur and its adjoining areas in Hooghly district of West Bengal. In 2026, Begampuri sarees were recognized as a Geographical Indication (GI tag) product under the title 'Begampuri Saree' in Bengali and in English 'Begampuri Cotton Handloom Saree'.

This saree is traditionally woven on a Khatkhti loom using 40S-60S cotton yarn, but is now also woven using 100S yarn. The number of wafts per inch in this saree is almost equal to the number of wefts per inch. Sarees have additional warp designs, for which wooden dobby is widely used, and currently jacquard is also being used. Depending on the complexity of the design, these cotton sarees can take anywhere from 1–2 to 6 days to weave.

The history of Begampuri sarees, woven on handlooms in the Hooghly district of West Bengal, dates back to the 16th century. According to the Ministry of Textiles, there were 400 registered weavers involved in Begampuri saree weaving in 2015.

== History ==
The Begampur saree from Hooghly district of West Bengal has a rich history, deeply intertwined with the heritage of the traditional weaving industry of the region. The handloom history of Begampuri saree traced back to 200-250 years ago, dobby and jacquard were not introduced to the fly shuttle looms. The Begampuri saree may have originated during the Mughal era, when royal courts patronized skilled artisans and weavers for their craft. Historical evidence of the expansion and influence of Mughal rule in these regions has been found, and also mention the Motaperey saree (wide-bordered saree) and its weavers of these also found mentioned in ancient texts. The weaving industry in Begumpur began experimentally during the Mughal dynasty (1526-1761) and expanded during the British period (1858-1947). The development of weaving in this region was influenced by both Mughal patronage and the local cultural milieu.

== Features ==
The weavers of Begampur use a type of frame loom, also known as the khatkati-tant in the region. The Begumpuri saree is distinguished by its design and the presence of some types of weaving techniques, such as 'chiur' (patterns made with wooden strips). The anchal may have some designs, which are made by making sheds with the help of bamboo rods and passing the weft through them. Its wide border were often densely woven with two-colored threads, such as black and red, which made it stronger.

The Begampuri saree is known for its vibrant color combinations and a distinctive over-stretched thread groove design on the main body, anchal, and border. Narrow border are woven with various striped and patterned motif designs using dyed cotton yarn as the warp.

== Tool ==
Handlooms, dobby looms, and jacquard looms are used in the production of this saree.

Different looms used in weaving Begampuri sarees
Handloom	Dobby	Jacquard
Simple weave	Small geometric patterns	
A handloom is a simple machine used for weaving.	A Dobby loom is a type of floor loom that controls the whole warp threads using a dobby head.	Mechanical looms, which simplify the process of making textiles with complex designs.
		Multiple shuttles could be used to control the colour of the weft during picking.

== Sources ==
- Kumar, Alok (2015). Prayas (in English and Hindi). Development Commissioner (Handlooms).
- Ghosh, Dr. Jayanta (19 April 2022). "GI Application Of Begampur Cotton Handloom Saree".
- Registry, Geographical Indication (25 November 2025). "Part of Geographical Indications Journal 210 - G.I. APPLICATION NUMBER – 877". Internet Archive. Chennai: Geographical Indications Journal 210.
