= Durga Puja in West Bengal =

Hindu festival

Sarodiya Durga Puja
- UNESCO Intangible Cultural Heritage
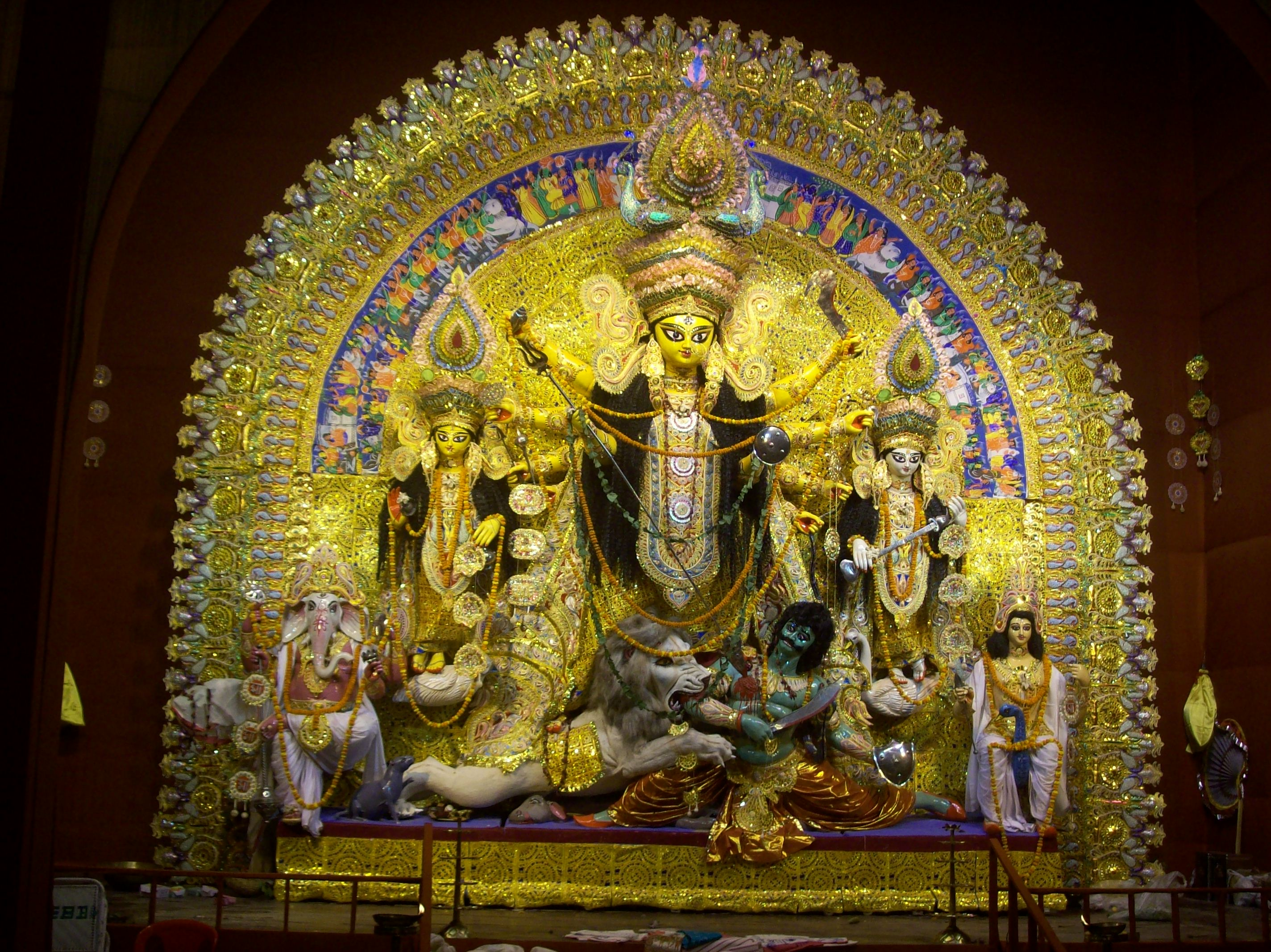
- Maddox Square, Kolkata Durga Puja celebration in 2012
- Country: India
- Reference: 00703
- Region: West Bengal (celebrated statewide)

Inscription history
- Inscription: 2021
- List: Representative
- Observances: Sindoor Khela, Worship of Goddess Durga

Durga Puja (Bengali: পশ্চিমবঙ্গের দুর্গাপূজা) is an annual festival celebrated magnificently marking the worship of the Hindu mother goddess, Durga. It is the largest festival of West Bengal. The festival is observed with pandals, idol installations, community celebrations, fairs, and rituals. Kolkata hosts the largest number of Durga Puja committees in the state and is known for its theme-based and traditional pujas. Asansol–Durgapur, Siliguri, Basirhat, and Berhampore also organize large-scale celebrations.

== Police-registered Durga Puja pandals by top cities ==
The following table shows the number of Durga Puja pandals officially registered with the local police authorities in various cities of West Bengal:

Police-Registered Durga Puja Pandals in West Bengal (2025)
| City | Number of Registered Pujas |
|---|---|
| Kolkata | 248 |
| Asansol–Durgapur | 100+ |
| Siliguri | 82 |
| Basirhat | 73 |
| Berhampore | 47 |

== Regional observations ==
=== Kolkata ===
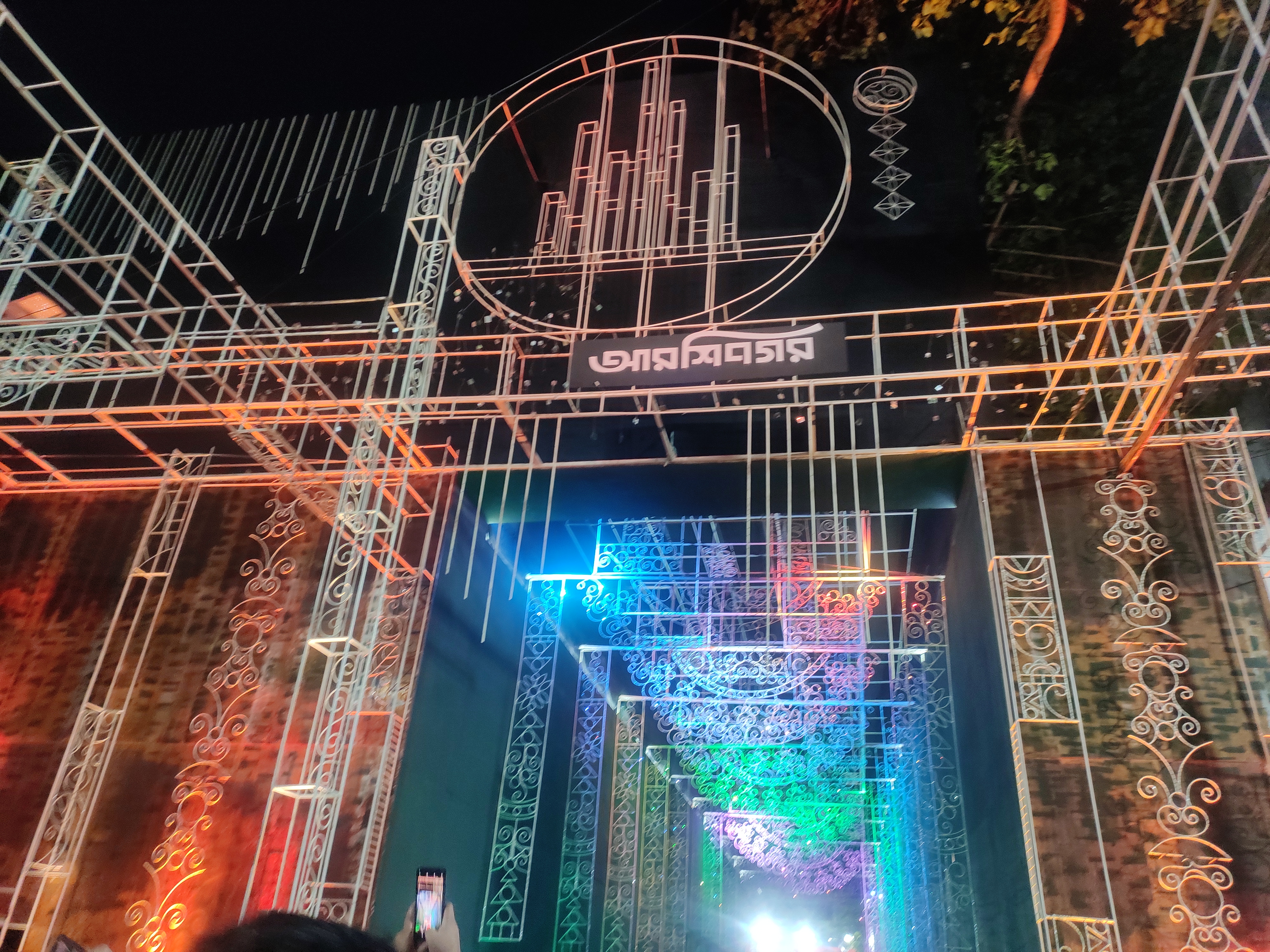
Ballygunge Cultural Association, Rashbehari, Kolkata presenting Arshinagar in their pandal

In Kolkata, Durga Puja is an annual festival celebrated magnificently. Kolkata alone hosted more than 3,000 Barowari pujas in Kolkata in 2022, with more than 200 pujas were organized in the city with a budget of over one crore rupees. Kolkata has been inscribed on the list of UNESCO Intangible Cultural Heritage Lists in December 2021. Barowari pujas like Kashi Bose Lane, Jagat Mukherjee Park, Santosh Mitra Square (Lebutala Park), Chetla Agrani, Suruchi Sangha, Ballygunge Cultural Association, Tridhara Sammilani, Hindusthan Club, Hindustan Park are famous for its interior decoration of the pandal. Meanwhile, Bagbazar Sorbojonin, Maddox Square, Ekdalia Evergreen and many more clubs are famous for the tradition of Sabeki Pujo.

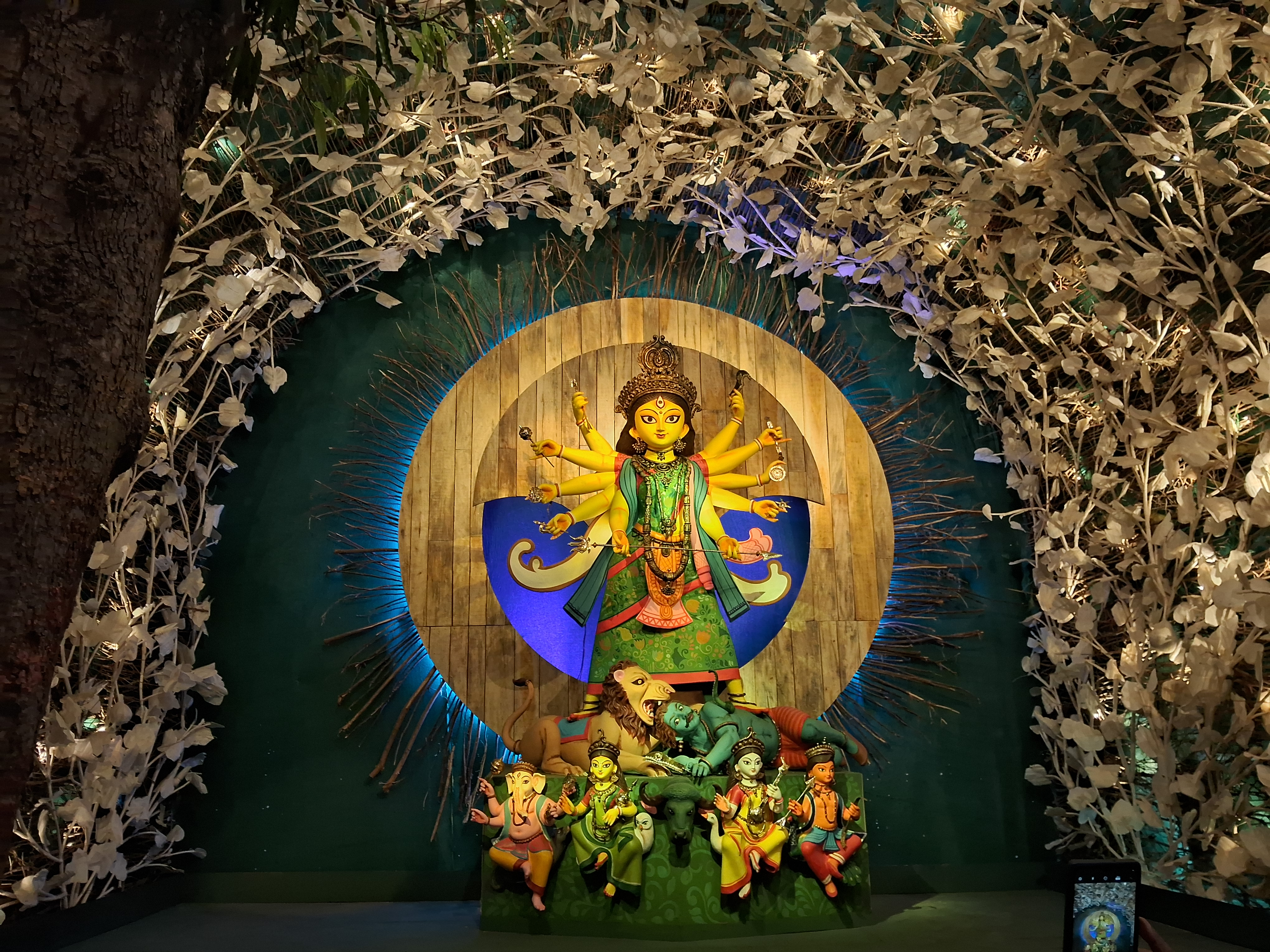
Hindustan Park Durga Puja 2023, Gariahat, Kolkata

The Durga Puja Carnival held annually, is an extension of the Durga Puja festivities in Kolkata.

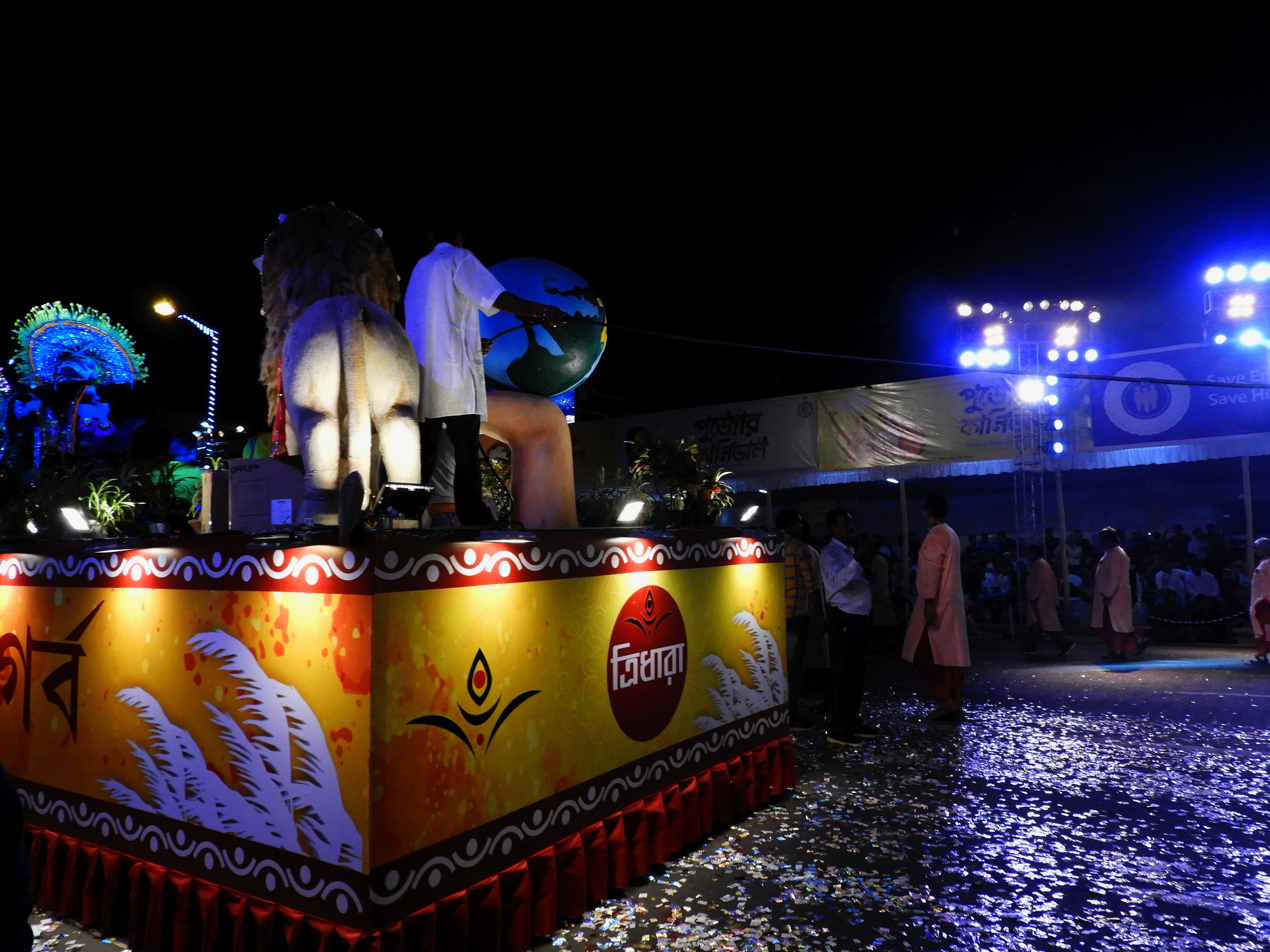
Tridhara Sammilani featuring their tableaux in Durga Puja Carnival of Kolkata

While the centuries-old rajbari pujas with their Sabeki Protima and traditions are still popular, theme based pujas have risen in the present scenario and have become popular, recording huge number of footfalls every year. Due to many people visiting pandals every year and overcrowding on the main five days, pandals are inaugurated from Mahalaya, much before Shashti. The magnification in the cost of expenditure has also lead the budget to be shifted from only chandas to advertisements and certain extent of government funding. Despite these changes, people have welcomed the pinch to their age-old tradition.

=== Basirhat ===
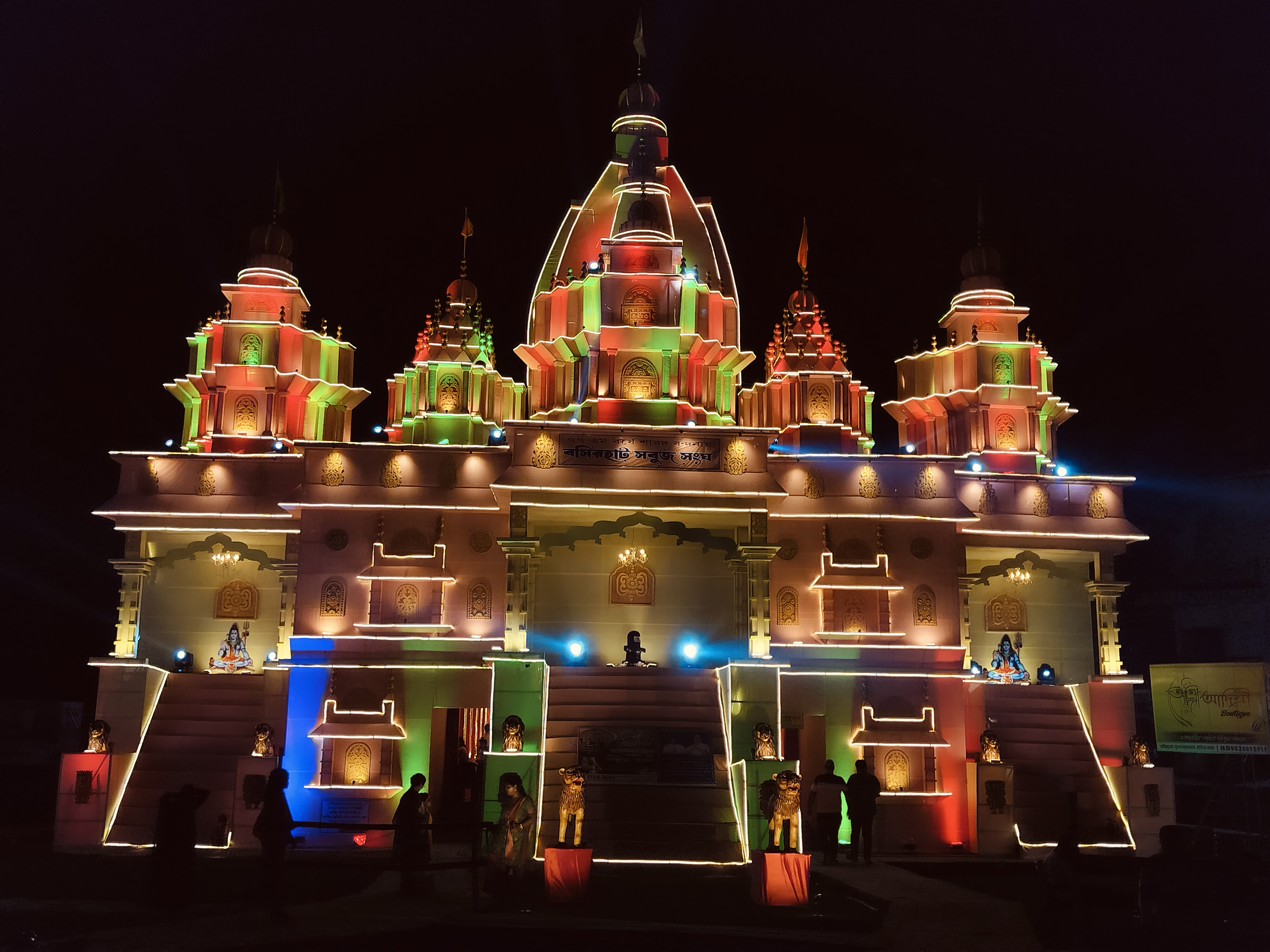
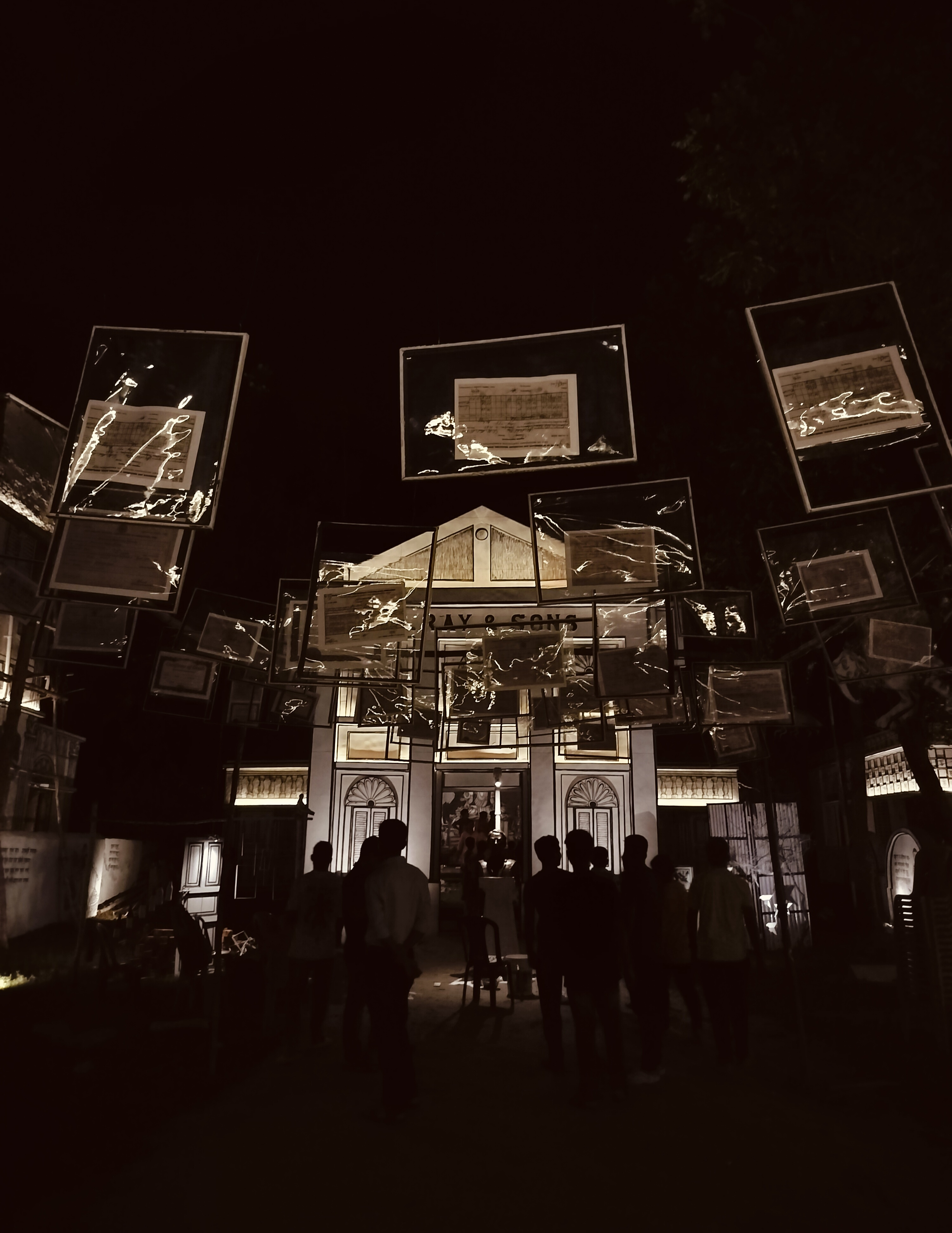
From left to right: (a) Grand decorations by Sobuj Sangha; (b) Installations by Gheepukur Dhar Netaji Union — both are key Durga Puja committees of Basirhat.

In Basirhat, West Bengal, the scale and intensity of Durga Puja celebrations are among the largest in North 24 Parganas district. In terms of the number of Durga Puja pandals, the city ranks fourth in West Bengal, following Kolkata, Asansol-Durgapur, and Siliguri. For more than 150 years, the Durga idol has been immersed on boats in this city. On the day of Vijayadashami, people usually come in Basirhat to see the immersion festival. The idols and installations have changed in the modern era, but the immersion continues to be done in the Ichamati River by boat according to the ancient tradition. A fair is held on both banks of the river centering on the immersion. The special attraction of this fair is wooden furniture and various wooden items.

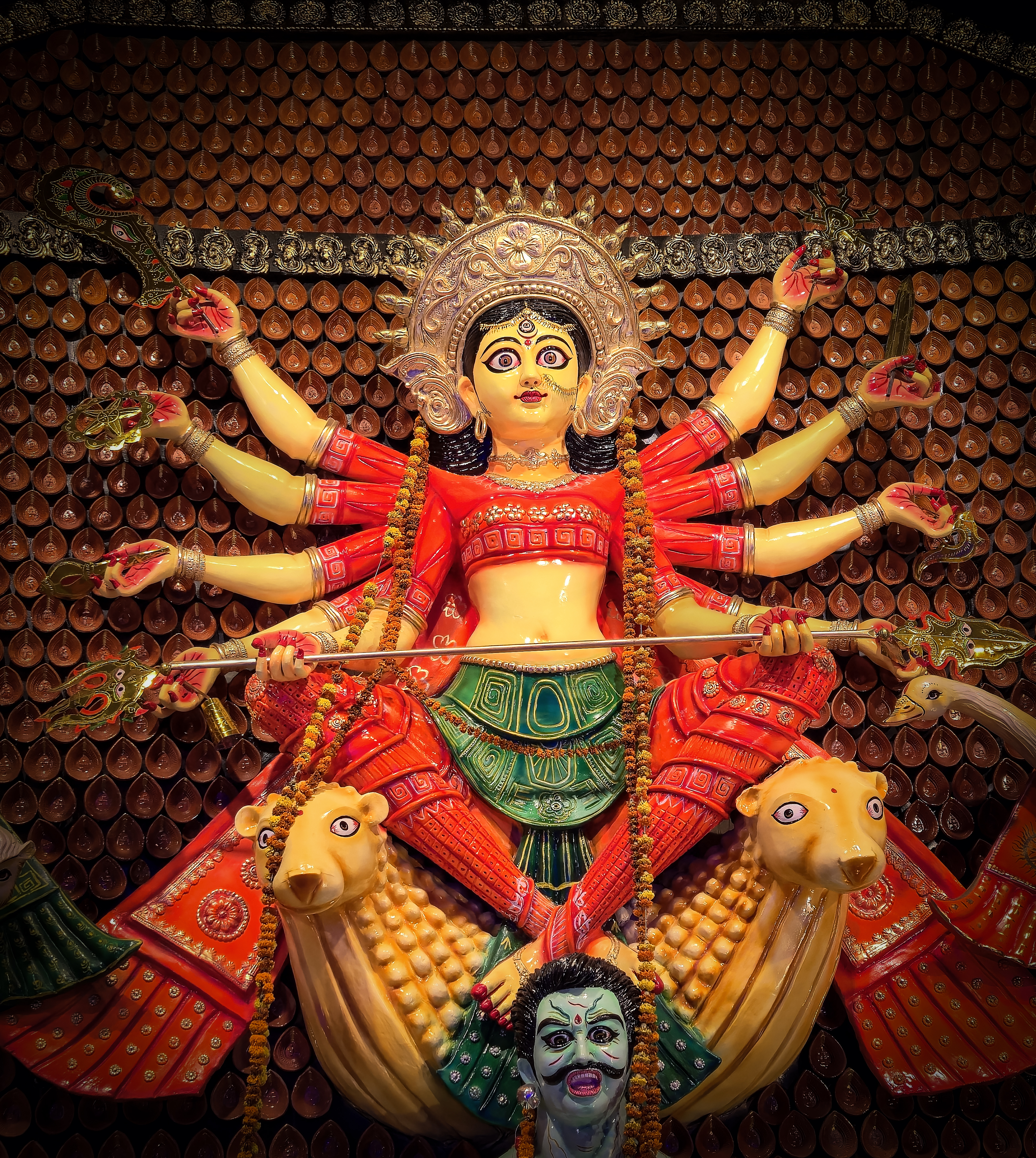
Durga idol displayed to the public in Vivekananda Sangha, Basirhat, West Bengal

== See also ==
- Durga Puja in Kolkata
- Durga Puja in Bangladesh
- Navratri
- Kolkata
- Basirhat
