= Eklakhi, Hooghly =

Eklakhi
- Village
- Location in West Bengal, India Eklakhi (India)
- Coordinates: 22.6686°N 88.2689°E
- Country: India
- State: West Bengal
- District: Hooghly

Government
  - Body: Gram panchayat

Population (2011)
  - Total: 1,783

Languages
  - Official: Bengali, English
- Time zone: UTC+5:30 (IST)
- ISO 3166 code: IN-WB
- Vehicle registration: WB
- Lok Sabha constituency: Serampore
- Vidhan Sabha constituency: Chanditala
- Website: wb.gov.in

Eklakhi is a village in Chanditala II community development block of Srirampore subdivision in Hooghly district in the Indian state of West Bengal.

== Geography ==
Eklakhi is located at 22.6686°N 88.2689°E. Chanditala police station serves this Village.

=== Gram panchayat ===
Villages and census towns in Garalgachha gram panchayat are: Eklakhi, Garalgachha and Krishnapur

== Demographics ==
As per 2011 Census of India, Eklakhi had a population of 1,783 of which 934 (52%) were males and 849 (48%) females. Population below 6 years was 154. The number of literates in Eklakhi was 1,222 (75.02% of the population over 6 years).
