= Ballygunge Cultural Association =

- Named after: Ballygunge
- Type: Durga Puja
- Location: Kolkata
- Region served: West Bengal

Ballygune Cultural Association is the most famous Sarbojanin (public) Durga idol kept at Ballygunge, a prominent locality in south Kolkata in the state of West Bengal, during the Durga Puja festival. The idol is kept for public display for approximately 5 days Or more; thereafter it is immersed in the Ganges at Babu Ghat on the auspicious day of Vijayadashami.

From 2017, this puja participates in the annual immersion carnival organised by Government of West Bengal on the iconic Red Road in the city of Kolkata.

Over a million people visit this Pandal daily during the Durga Puja festival.

In 2015, the Ballygunge Cultural Association entered 65 years. In 2019, for their 69th Durga Puja, Ballygunge Cultural Association illustrated the fusion of tradition and modernism in its theme, which is to be presented as 'Jugalbandi'.
