= Begampur, India =

Begampur বেগমপুর
- Census Town
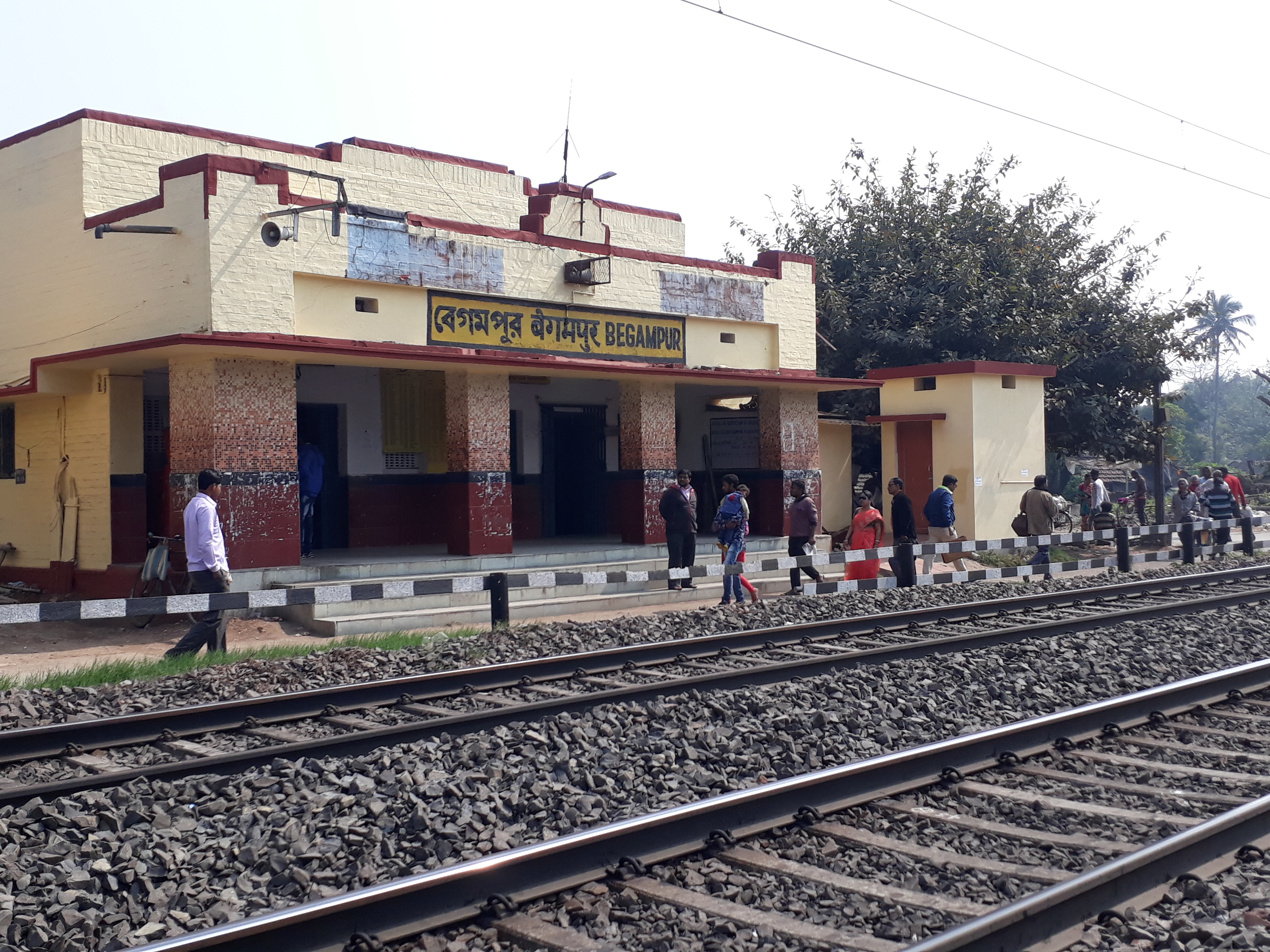
- Begampur Railway Station, Begampur

- Location in West Bengal, India Begampur (India)
- Coordinates: 22.7368°N 88.2518°E
- Country: India
- State: West Bengal
- District: Hooghly
- Elevation: 15 m (49 ft)

Population (2026)
  - Total: 15,600

Languages
  - Official: Bengali, English
- Time zone: UTC+5:30 (IST)
- PIN: 712306
- ISO 3166 code: IN-WB
- Vehicle registration: WB
- Lok Sabha constituency: Singur
- Vidhan Sabha constituency: Singur
- Website: wb.gov.in

Begampur is a Census Town and a Gram Panchayat in the Kolkata Metropolitan Area of Hooghly district in the Indian state of West Bengal. It is a part of area covered by Kolkata Metropolitan Development Authority (KMDA). It is a part of Chanditala-II Development Block.

This place is famous for its own variety of GI-tagged "tant saree" called Begampuri Saree. These sarees can be identified by their loosely woven, light-weight and translucent made and have contrasting borders in red, black, purple, orange etc. These are also emphasized by a serrated edge motif. Narrow borders are woven with designs of a variety of stripes and figured motifs using dyed cotton yarn on the weft.

Gupta Bari, in Begampur, is particularly famous for being the ancestral home of Ashapurna Devi, and organises the oldest Kali Puja (around 350 years old) in the locality.

== Geography ==
=== Location ===
Begampur is located at 22.7368°N 88.2518°E.

Begampur serves as a central hub within a series of census towns that span from the northern to southern parts of Chanditala II CD Block. To its north lie Tisa, Kapashanria, and Jaykrishnapur, while to its south are situated Baksa, Panchghara, Chikrand, Janai, Pairagachha, Naiti, Barijhati, Garalgachha, and Krishnapur, collectively forming a linear distribution across the block's geography. Kharsarai and Purba Tajpur are other villages within Begampur which are under the jurisdiction of Begampur Gram Panchayat.

=== Police Station ===
Chanditala Police Station, under Hooghly Rural Police, serves this area.

=== Fire Station ===
Begampur does not have any Fire Station. Nearest Fire Station is Dankuni Fire Station.

== Demographics ==
Begampur is a Census Town in Hooghly district, West Bengal. As of 2001 census, it has population of 9545 people of which 4881 were men and 4664 women. According to 2011 Census, it had a population of 6,432 of which 3,196 are males and 3,236 are females. Children aged 0–6 comprised 802 (7.65% of total population). Schedule Castes constitute 10.58% of the population, while Schedule Tribes represent 0.08%.

The female sex ratio stands at 940 against the state average of 950, while the child sex ratio is 883 compared to West Bengal's average of 956. Literacy in Begampur is 87.81%, exceeding the state average of 76.26%, with male literacy at 91.06% and female literacy at 84.36%.

Begampur Census Town administers 2,587 houses, providing water and sewerage services while maintaining authority to construct roads and levy property taxes within its limits. Of the total population, 4,510 were engaged in work, comprising 3,512 males and 998 females. Main work accounted for 86.16% of workers, with marginal work comprising 13.84%.

The estimated population for 2026 is approximately 15,600. The 2021 Census was postponed due to COVID-19, with a new census expected in 2026. Current projections are estimates; 2011 figures are verified.

== Civic administration ==
The civic administration of Begampur is overseen by the Begampur Gram Panchayat, which is responsible for providing basic civic amenities and services to the residents of the village.

The Begampur Gram Panchayat is headed by a Pradhan who is elected by the members of the panchayat. The panchayat is divided into wards, and each ward is represented by a Panchayat member who are elected by the residents of respective wards.

== Economy ==
Around a total of 32 lakh people from all around the city commute to Kolkata daily for work. Begampur is one of West Bengal's most renowned cotton weaving hubs. The local economy is sustained by weavers producing fine-textured saris, dhotis, and jamdanis. The Begampur Handloom Cluster Development Society supports the industry, which provides wide employment opportunities. Farming is also an occupation of some residents of Begampur as the region is part of the agriculturally rich Hooghly-Damodar alluvial plain.

== Transport ==
=== Railways ===
Begampur railway station is situated 23 kilometres (14 mi) from Howrah on the Howrah-Bardhaman chord line and is part of the Kolkata Suburban Railway system. In the Howrah-Bardhaman (chord line) section there are 50 trains that carry commuters from 37 railway stations.

=== Roadways ===
Chanditala-Bora-Serampore Road is the main road passing through Begampur, which connects it to Durgapur Expressway and Dankuni.

=== Metro railway ===
Nearest metro station is Dakhineswar Metro Station, about 19 km from Begampur.

=== Airport ===
Nearest airport is Netaji Subash Chandra Bose International Airport, about 30 km from Begampur.

== Education ==
- Begampur High School is a coeducational higher secondary school at Begampur. It has arrangements for teaching Bengali, English, history, philosophy, political science, education, physics, chemistry, mathematics, bio science and commerce.
- Begampur Girls School is a secondary school for girls.

== Healthcare ==
Begampur has a Primary Health Centre with 6 beds. In 2013 a private nursing home named Village Health Care started with 40+ beds.

== Tourist Places and Notable Events ==
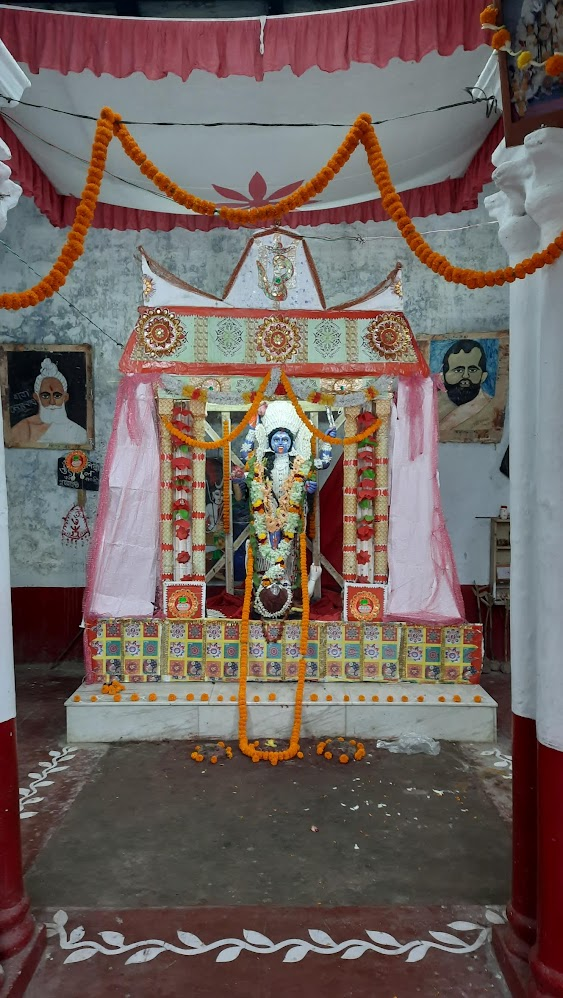
Gupta Bari Kali Puja

- Akal Vishwakarma (untimely Viswakarma) is celebrated at Tantipara, Begampur. The speciality is Lord Vishwakarma is portrayed with two hands engaged in weaving, and riding a horse, instead of being seated on an elephant with four hands. Many tourists visit Begampur to witness this rare puja of Lord Viswakarma.
- Raksha Kali (Protector Kali) is celebrated before Shiva Ratri with large number of music, dance processions and devotees flock from different parts of Hooghly to witness this puja.
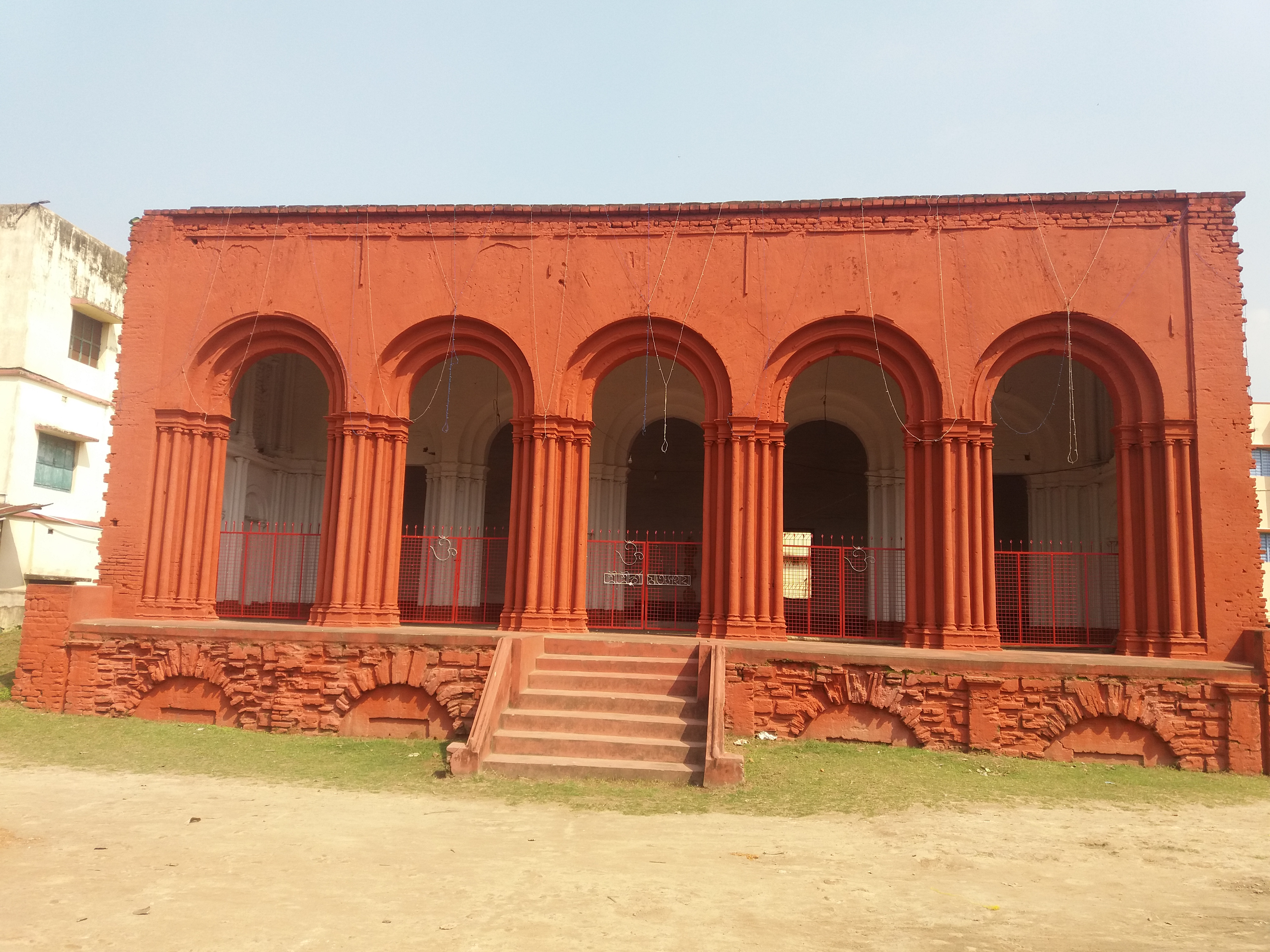
  Ghosh Bari Durga Mandir
- Bonedi bari Durga Puja is famous at Gupta Bari, Ghosh Bari and Chandra Bari. Many tourist agencies operate a number of tourist packages combining Durga Pujas of Baksha and Janai.
- Kali Puja at Gupta Bari, Begampur, around 350yrs old, is the most famous Kali Puja in Begampur. A number of clubs and societies together organise a number of other theme based Puja Pandels, with the famous being Boro Kali near rail station and Quick Association. Tourists from all over Hooghly come to visit the pandels. A large green fire cracker market is also set up during Kali Puja.

== Notable people ==
- Ancestral home of Ashapurna Devi is Gupta Bari (a Baidya family), Begampur.
- Birthplace of painter Gobhardhan Ash.
- Birthplace of Nafisa Ali.
- Birthplace of Sk. Wajid Ali.
