= Begampur railway station =

Railway station in West Bengal, India

Begampur বেগমপুর
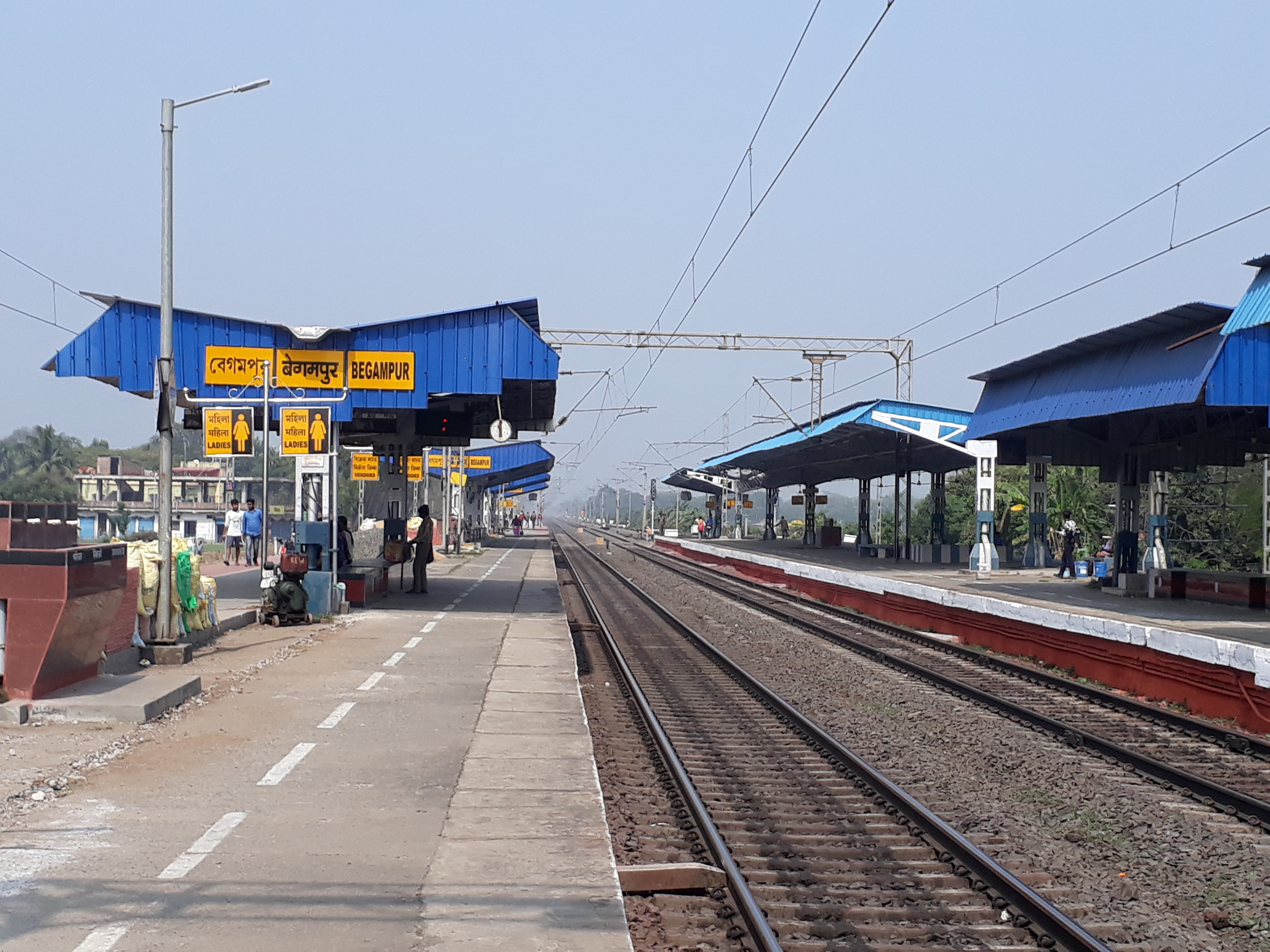
- Begampur railway station

General information
- Location: Chanditala–Serampore Road, Begampur, Hooghly district, West Bengal; India
- Coordinates: 22°44′18″N 88°15′18″E
- Elevation: 11 metres (36 ft)
- System: Kolkata Suburban Railway
- Owner: Indian Railways
- Operator: Eastern Railway
- Line: Howrah–Bardhaman chord
- Platforms: 4
- Tracks: 4

Construction
- Structure type: Standard (on ground station)
- Parking: No
- Accessible: Yes

Other information
- Status: Functioning
- Station code: BPAE
- Zone(s): Eastern Railway
- Division(s): Howrah

History
- Opened: 1917
- Electrified: 1964
- Former names: East Indian Railway Company

Services
Preceding station	Kolkata Suburban Railway	Following station
Janai Road towards Howrah Junction	Eastern Line Howrah–Bardhaman chord	Baruipara towards Barddhaman Junction
Route map
Location
- Location within West Bengal Location within India

Begampur railway station is a Kolkata Suburban Railway station on the Howrah–Bardhaman chord line operated by Eastern Railway zone of Indian Railways. It is situated beside Chanditala–Serampore Road, at Begampur in Hooghly district in the Indian state of West Bengal.

== History ==
The Howrah–Bardhaman chord, the 95 kilometers railway line was constructed in 1917. It is connected with Sealdah through Dankuni after the construction of Vivekananda Setu in 1932. Howrah to Bardhaman chord line including Begampur railway station was electrified in 1964–66. It is in Suburban Station 3 (SG-3) category under Howrah Division (HWH).

== Station Facilities ==
Station categorised as SG-3 station, has passenger facilities which include the :

=== Ticket Counter ===
There are two counters for tickets, along with two Automatic Ticket Vending Machines(ATVM).

=== Divyangjan Facilities ===
Wheelchairs and stretchers for specially abled people are available at Begampur. Ramp at Main Entry, Water tap and Toilets are also available for them.

== Shopping ==
Souvenir shop, dress, book and magazine stalls on platform number 1 & 2.

== Last-mile connectivity ==
=== Roads ===
The Serampore Bora Chanditala road passes through Begampur Railway Station. It connects it to Durgapur Expressway and Dankuni.

Auto and Toto are available, connecting with Bora, Janai and Chanditala.
