= Baidyabati Municipality =

Municipal Corporation in West Bengal, India

Coordinates: 22.77213°N 88.32835°E

Type
- Type: Municipality

History
- Founded: 1869; 157 years ago

Leadership
- Chairman: Pintu Mahata, AITC
- Vice Chairman: Santanu Dutta, AITC

Structure
- Seats: 23
- Political groups: Government (16): AITC (16); Opposition (4): INC (2); CPI(M) (1); AIFB (1); Others (3): IND (3)

Elections
- Last election: 2022
- Next election: 2027

Website
- www.baidyabatimunicipality.org

Baidyabati Municipality is the civic body that governs Baidyabati and its surrounding areas (Sheoraphuli and partly Chatra) in Srirampore subdivision of Hooghly district, West Bengal, India.

== History ==
Baidyabati Municipality was established in 1869, under the leadership of Raja Girindrachandra of Sheoraphuli Rajbari. He was succeeded by Raja N.C Ghosh of Sheoraphuli Rajbari, the longest serving municipal head (33 years). The Sheoraphuli-Tarakeshwar line was constructed on debuttar property in 1885 and was inspected by Lord Dufferin and Raja Girindrachandra.

== Geography ==
Baidyabati Municipality covers an area of 12.03 km^{2} and has a population of 121,110 (2011).

In 1981, 25.00% of the total population formed main workers and 75.00% were non-workers in Baidyabati Municipality and 27.00% of the total main workers were industrial workers. This may be interpreted as follows: although industrial activities are prominent in the municipal areas of the region, the major portion of the population is commuters and migrants find employment in the area.

== Elections ==
In the 2015 municipal elections for Baidyabati Municipality Trinamool Congress won 13 seats, CPI (M) 1 seat, Forward Bloc 3 seats, Congress 3 seats and Independents 3 seats.

In the 2010 municipal elections for Baidyabati Municipality Trinamool Congress won 12 seats, CPI (M) 4 seats, Forward Bloc 3 seats and Congress won 3 seats.

About the 2010 municipal elections, The Guardian wrote, "Today's municipal elections are unlike any for decades: the Communists, who have held West Bengal's main towns almost without a break since the 1970s, are facing disaster… This time defeat is likely to be definitive and could signal the beginning of the end for the Communist Party of India-Marxist (CPIM)."

In the 2005 municipal elections for Baidyabati Municipality, CPI (M) won 8 seats, Forward Block 4 seats, Congress 6 seats and Trinamool Congress 4 seats.
