= Konnagar Municipality =

Municipal body in West Bengal, India

Type
- Type: Municipality

History
- Founded: 1944; 82 years ago

Leadership
- Chairman: Vacant
- Vice Chairman: Vacant

Structure
- Seats: 20
- Political groups: Government (6): AITC (6); Opposition (2): CPI(M) (1); INC (1); Vacant (12): Vacant (12)

Elections
- Last election: 2022
- Next election: 2027

Website
- www.konnagarmunicipality.org

Konnagar Municipality is the civic body that governs Konnagar and its surrounding areas in Srirampore subdivision of Hooghly district, West Bengal, India.

== History ==
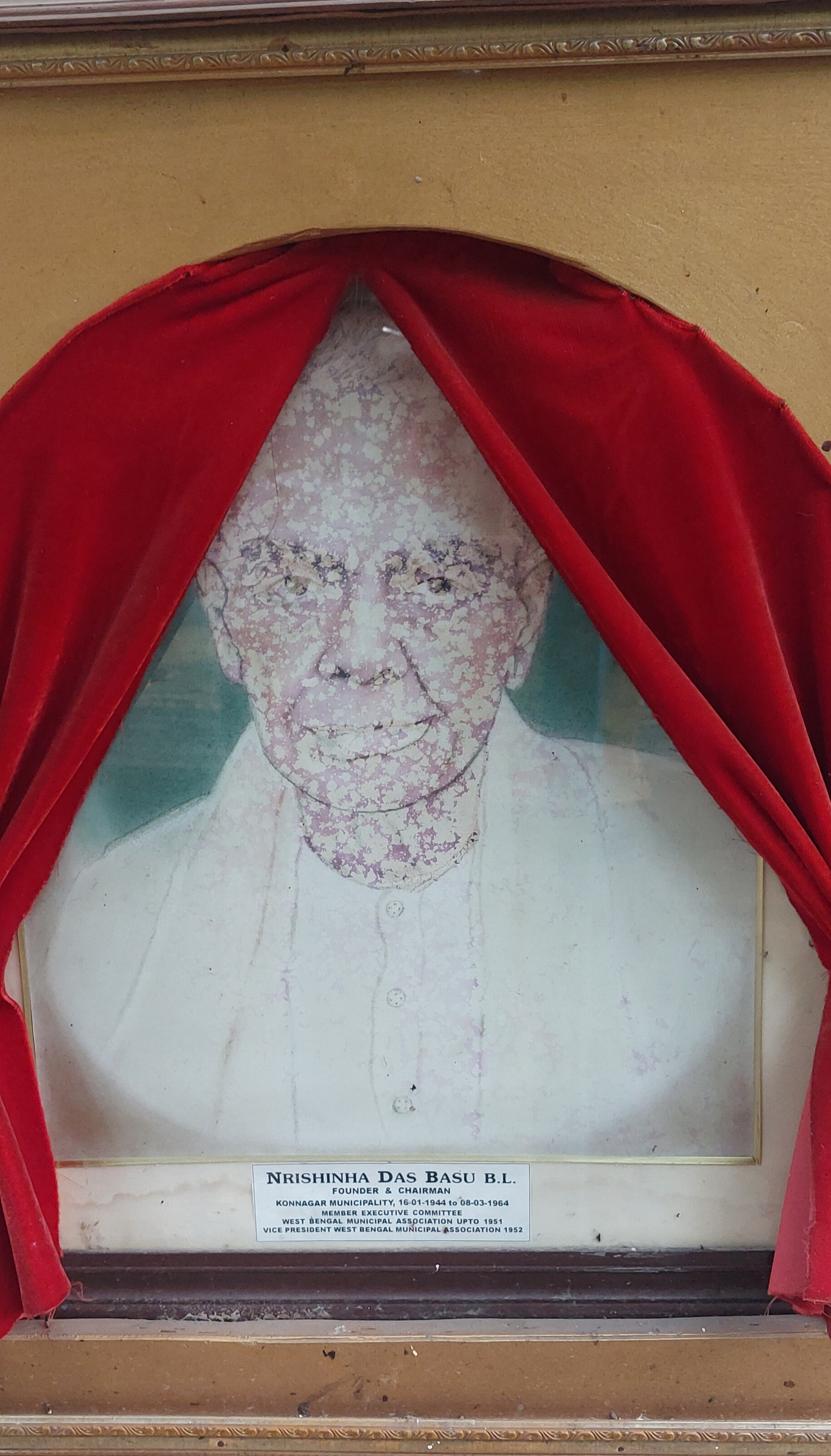
Nrishinha Das Basu, Founder and first Chairman of the Municipality

Konnagar Municipality was established in 1944. Nrishinha Das Basu was the founder and first Chairman of the Municipality. Sib Chandra Deb contributed tirelessly towards the development of Konnagar. After independence, a large number of displaced persons from East Pakistan settled in Konnagar.

== Geography ==
Konnagar Municipality covers an area of 4.67 sq km and has a total population of 76,152 (2011).

In 1981, 27.09% of the total population formed main workers and 72.91% were non-workers in Konnagar Municipality and 49.26% of the total main workers were industrial workers. This may be interpreted as follows: although industrial activities are prominent in the municipal areas of the region, the major portion of the population is commuters and migrants find employment in the area.

== Healthcare ==
Konnagar Matri Sadan O Sishu Mangal Pratisthan, with 43 beds, is located in the Konnagar Municipality area.

== List of councillors ==
(2022-present)

Ward	Name	Party
1	Monalisa Nag	All India Trinamool Congress
2		
3		
4		
5		
6		
7	Sk. Abdul Gaffar	Communist Party of India
8		
9		
10	Tanmoy Deb	All India Trinamool Congress
11		
12	Jonaki Bag	All India Trinamool Congress
13	Arunagshu Majumdar	Indian National Congress
14		
15		
16	Subhasis Chowdhury	All India Trinamool Congress
17	Biswarup Chakraborty	All India Trinamool Congress
18		
19	Chandan Mondal	All India Trinamool Congress
20		

== Elections ==
=== 2022 ===
S.No.	Party name	Party symbol	Number of Councillors	Change
1.	AITC		17	▲6
2.	CPI(M)		1	▼3
3.	INC		1	▼4

=== 2015 ===
S.No.	Party name	Party symbol	Number of Councillors	Change
1.	AITC		11	▲1
2.	INC		5	▲2
3.	CPI(M)		4	▼3

=== 2010 ===
S.No.	Party name	Party symbol	Number of Councillors	Change
1.	AITC		10	▲8
2.	CPI(M)		7	▼5
3.	INC		3	Steady

About the 2010 municipal elections, The Guardian wrote, "Today's municipal elections are unlike any for decades: the Communists, who have held West Bengal's main towns almost without a break since the 1970s, are facing disaster… This time defeat is likely to be definitive and could signal the beginning of the end for the Communist Party of India-Marxist (CPIM)."

=== 2005 ===
S.No.	Party name	Party symbol	Number of Councillors
1.	CPI(M)		12
2.	INC		3
3.	AITC		2
