= Rishra Municipality =

Municipal body in West Bengal, India

Coordinates: 22.72414°N 88.34457°E

Type
- Type: Municipality

History
- Founded: 1944; 82 years ago

Leadership
- Chairman: Vijay Sagar Mishra, AITC
- Vice Chairman: Zahid Hassan Khan, AITC

Structure
- Seats: 23
- Political groups: Government (19): AITC (19); Opposition (3): BJP (2); INC (1); Others (1): IND (1)

Elections
- Last election: 2022
- Next election: 2027

Website
- www.rishramunicipality.org

Rishra Municipality is the civic body that governs Rishra and its surrounding areas in Srirampore subdivision of Hooghly district, West Bengal, India.

== History ==
Rishra municipality was established in 1944.

The earliest mention of Rishra is found in Bipradas Pipilai’s poem Manasa Mangal Kavya in the fifteenth century. Rishra grew as a place of habitation of cotton and silk weavers, farmers and fishermen. Rishra and Konnagar were initially included in Serampore Municipality.

== Geography ==
Rishra Municipality covers an area of 6.48 sq km and has a total population of 122,000 (2011).

In 1981, 31.93% of the total population formed main workers and 68.07% were non-workers in Rishra Municipality and 75.22% of the total main workers were industrial workers. This may be interpreted as follows: although industrial activities are prominent in the municipal areas of the region, the major portion of the population is commuters and migrants find employment in the area.

== Healthcare ==
Rishra Municipal Seva Sadan (closed), with 150 beds, is located in the Rishra Municipality area.

== Elections ==
In the 2015 municipal elections for Rishra Municipality Trinamool Congress won 19 seats, CPI 1 seat, Congress 1 seat and Independents 2 seats.

In the 2010 municipal elections for Rishra Municipality Trinamool Congress won 9 seats, Congress won 8 seats, CPI (M) 4 seats, CPI 1 seat and Independent 1 seat.

About the 2010 municipal elections, The Guardian wrote, "Today's municipal elections are unlike any for decades: the Communists, who have held West Bengal's main towns almost without a break since the 1970s, are facing disaster… This time defeat is likely to be definitive and could signal the beginning of the end for the Communist Party of India-Marxist (CPIM)."

In the 2005 municipal elections for Rishra Municipality, CPI (M) won 5 seats, CPI 3 seats, Congress 8 seats, Trinamool Congress 1 seat and others 6 seats.
