= Dankuni Municipality =

Type
- Type: Municipality

History
- Founded: 2010; 16 years ago

Leadership
- Chairman: Hasina Shabnam, AITC
- Vice Chairman: Prakash Raha, AITC

Structure
- Seats: 21
- Political groups: Government (19): AITC (19); Opposition (1): INC (1); Others (1): IND (1)

Elections
- Last election: 2022
- Next election: 2027

Website
- www.dankunimunicipality.in

Dankuni Municipality is the civic body that governs Dankuni and its surrounding areas in Srirampore subdivision of Hooghly district, West Bengal, India.

== Geography ==
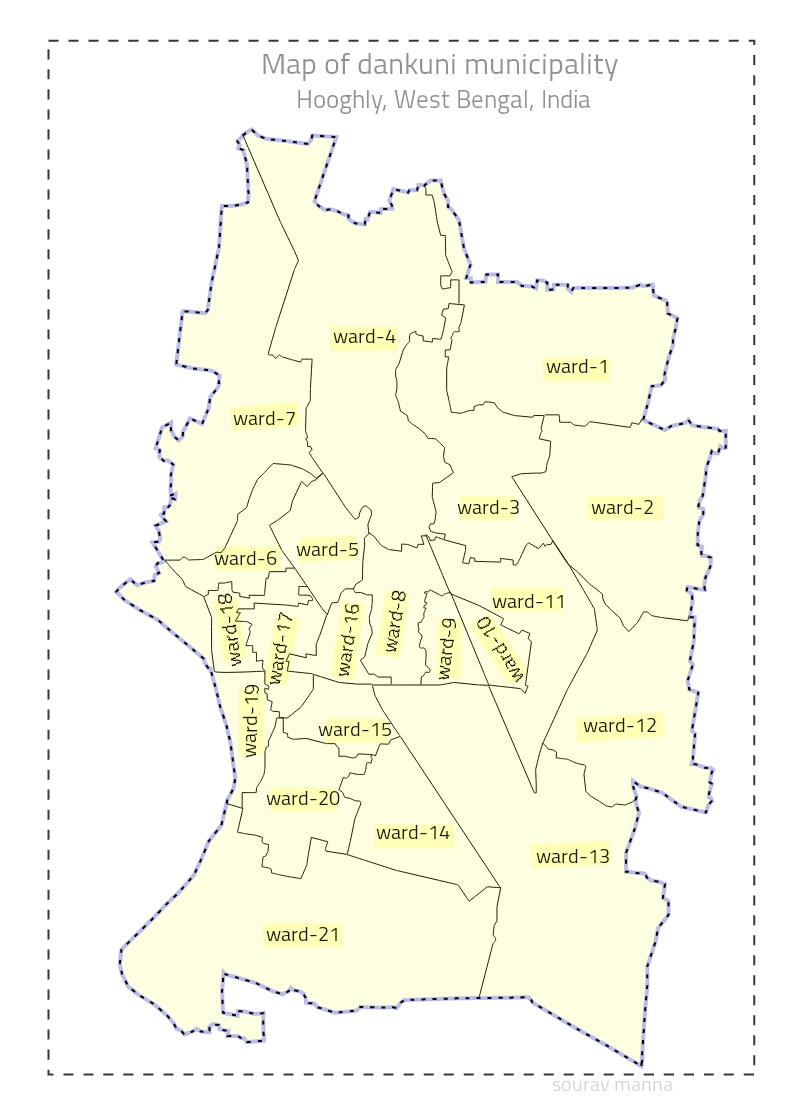
Map of dankuni municipality

Dankuni Municipality covers an area of 19.5 sq km and has a total population of 95,966 (2011).

Dankuni Municipality is located in the south-eastern part of Chanditala II CD Block.

== Elections ==
In the 2015 municipal elections for Dankuni Municipality Trinamool Congress won 11 seats, CPI (M) 8 seats, INC 1 seat and Independent 1 seat.
