= Jangalpara =

- Census Town
- Location in West Bengal, India Jangalpara (India)
- Coordinates: 22.731751°N 88.2068378°E
- Country: India
- State: West Bengal
- District: Hooghly
- Nearest City: Serampore

Population (2011)
  - Total: 7,478

Languages
  - Official: Bengali, English
- Time zone: UTC+5:30 (IST)
- PIN: 712701
- Vehicle registration: WB
- Lok Sabha constituency: Serampore
- Vidhan Sabha constituency: Chanditala
- Website: wb.gov.in

Jangalpara is a census town in Chanditala I CD Block in Srirampore subdivision of Hooghly district in the state of West Bengal, India.

== Geography ==
Cities and towns in Chanditala I, Chanditala II and Jangipara CD Blocks in Srirampore subdivision in Hooghly district
M: municipal city/ town, CT: census town, R: rural/ urban centre,
Owing to space constraints in the small map, the actual locations in a larger map may vary slightly

=== Location ===
Jangalpara is located at: 22°43′54″N 88°12′25″E

It is 28 km from District headquarters Hooghly.

Gangadharpur, Manirampur, Masat, Jangalpara, Dudhkalmi, Nababpur, Bhagabatipur, Kumirmora and Ramanathpur form a cluster of census towns in Chanditala I CD Block.

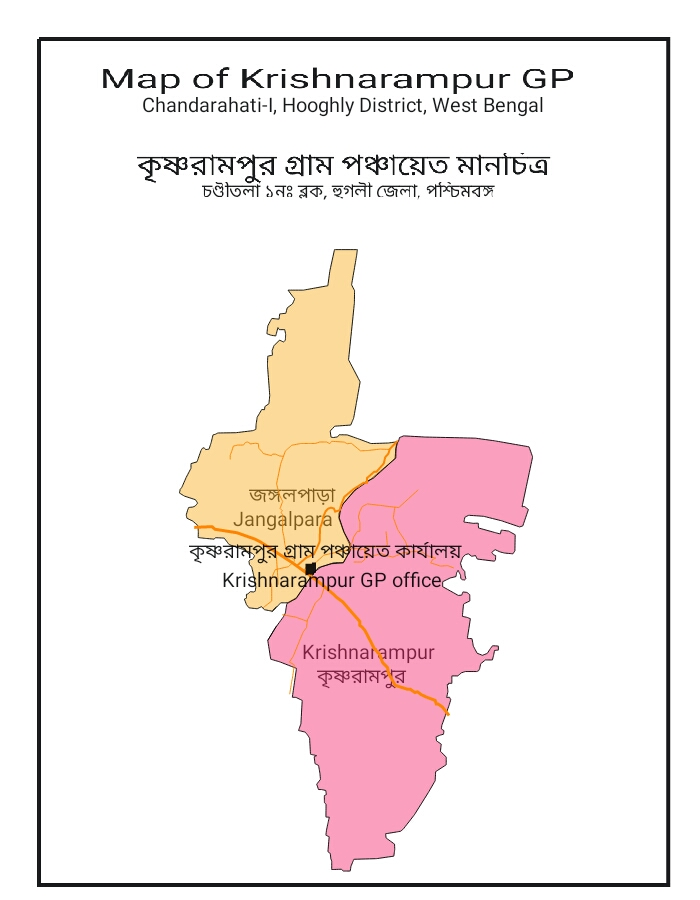

=== Urbanisation ===
Srirampore subdivision is the most urbanized of the subdivisions in Hooghly district. 73.13% of the population in the subdivision is urban and 26.88% is rural. The subdivision has 6 municipalities and 34 census towns. The municipalities are: Uttarpara Kotrung Municipality, Konnagar Municipality, Serampore Municipality, Baidyabati Municipality, Rishra Municipality and Dankuni Municipality. Amongst the CD Blocks in the subdivision, Uttarapara Serampore (census towns shown in a separate map) had 76% urban population, Chanditala I 42%, Chanditala II 69% and Jangipara 7% (census towns shown in the map above). All places marked in the map are linked in the larger full screen map.

=== Gram panchayat ===
Villages and census towns in Krishnarampur gram panchayat are: Krishnarampur and Jangalpara.

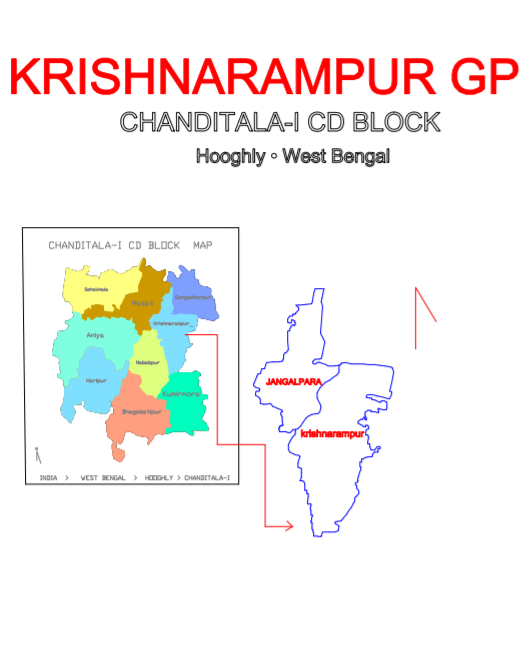
Map of KRISHNARAMPUR GP

== Demographics ==
As per 2011 Census of India, Jangalpara had a total population of 7,478 of which 3,752 (50%) were males and 3,726 (50%) were females. Population below 6 years was 724. The total number of literates in Jangalpara was 5,736 (84.93% of the population over 6 years).

== Transport ==
- Railway

Baruipara railway station its nearest railway station on Howrah-Bardhaman chord, which is a part of the Kolkata Suburban Railway system.

- Road

The main road is SH 15 (Ahilyabai Holkar Road). It is the main artery of the town and it is connected to NH 19 (old numbering NH 2)/Durgapur Expressway.

- Bus

=== Private Bus ===
- 26 Bonhooghly - Champadanga
- 26A Serampore - Aushbati
- 26C Bonhooghly - Jagatballavpur

=== Bus Routes without Numbers ===
- Howrah Station - Bandar (Dhanyaghori)

== Education ==
Jangalpara Krishnarampur Deshapran High School

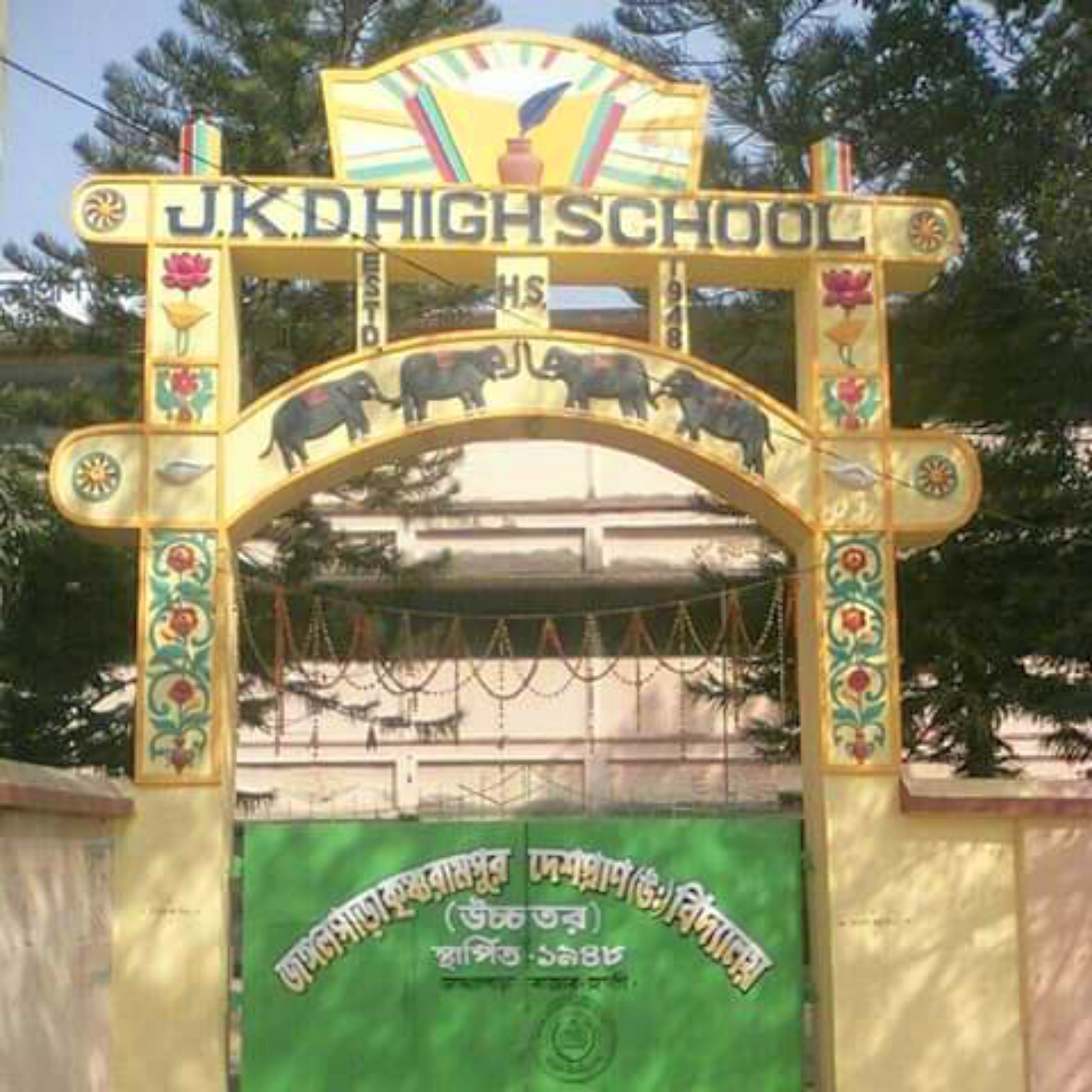
Jangalpara Krishnarampur Deshpran High School

Jangalpara Krishnarampur Deshapran High School is a coeducational higher secondary school at PO Jangalpara Bazar. It has facilities for teaching Bengali, English, Sanskrit, Arabic, history, philosophy, economics, geography, mathematics, physics, chemistry and bio-science.

== Healthcare ==
Jangalpara has a Primary Health Centre with 6 beds.
