= Kumirmora =

- Census Town
- Location in West Bengal, India Kumirmora (India)
- Coordinates: 22.6968602°N 88.2267446°E
- Country: India
- State: West Bengal
- District: Hooghly
- Nearest City: Serampore

Population (2011)
  - Total: 12,208

Languages
  - Official: Bengali, English
- Time zone: UTC+5:30 (IST)
- Vehicle registration: WB
- Lok Sabha constituency: Serampore
- Vidhan Sabha constituency: Chanditala
- Website: wb.gov.in

Kumirmora is a census town in Chanditala I CD Block in Srirampore subdivision of Hooghly district in the state of West Bengal, India.

== Geography ==
Cities and towns in Chanditala I, Chanditala II and Jangipara CD Blocks in Srirampore subdivision in Hooghly district
M: municipal city/ town, CT: census town, R: rural/ urban centre,
Owing to space constraints in the small map, the actual locations in a larger map may vary slightly

=== Location ===
Kumirmora is located at 22.69686°N 88.22674°E.

Gangadharpur, Manirampur, Masat, Jangalpara, Dudhkalmi, Nababpur, Bhagabatipur, Kumirmora and Ramanathpur form a cluster of census towns in Chanditala I CD Block.

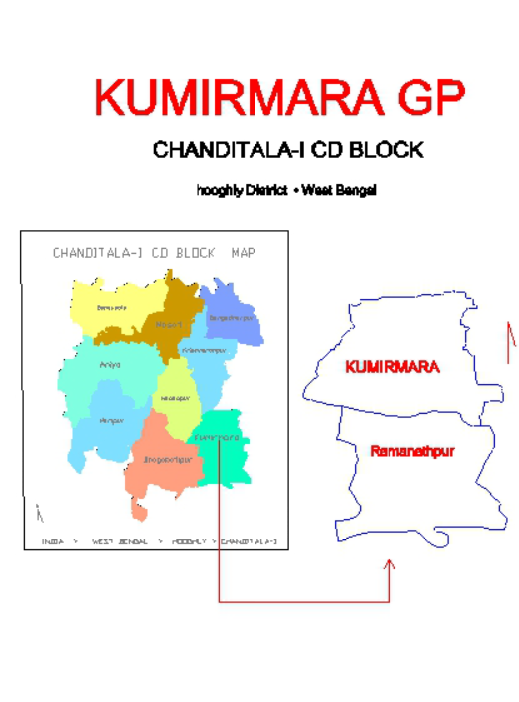
Map of KUMIRMARA GP

=== Urbanisation ===
Srirampore subdivision is the most urbanized of the subdivisions in Hooghly district. 73.13% of the population in the subdivision is urban and the rest is rural. The subdivision has 6 municipalities and 34 census towns. The municipalities are: Uttarpara Kotrung Municipality, Konnagar Municipality, Serampore Municipality, Baidyabati Municipality, Rishra Municipality and Dankuni Municipality. Amongst the CD Blocks in the subdivision, Uttarapara Serampore (census towns shown in a separate map) had 76% urban population, Chanditala I 42%, Chanditala II 69% and Jangipara 7% (census towns shown in the map above). All places marked in the map are linked in the larger full screen map.

== Demographics ==
As per 2011 Census of India Kumirmora had a population of 12,208, of which 6,063 (50%) were males and 6,145 (50%) females. Population below 6 years was 1,369. The number of literates in Kumirmora was 9,053 (83.52% of the population over 6 years).

== Transport ==
=== Railway and road ===
Janai Road railway station is the nearest railway station on the Howrah-Bardhaman chord of Kolkata Suburban Railway network. The main road is SH 15 (Ahilyabai Holkar Road). It is the main road of the town and is connected to NH 19 (old number NH 2).

=== Bus Routes ===
==== Private Bus Routes ====
- 26 Bonhooghly - Champadanga
- 26A Serampore - Aushbati
- 26C Bonhooghly - Jagatballavpur

==== Bus Routes without Numbers ====
- Howrah Station - Bandar (Dhanyaghori)
- Dakshineswar - Bhagabatipur
