= Alipur, Chanditala-I =

Alipur
- Village
- Location in West Bengal, India Alipur (India)
- Coordinates: 22.7130601°N 88.18873°E
- Country: India
- State: West Bengal
- District: Hooghly

Government
  - Body: Gram panchayat

Population (2011)
  - Total: 3,091

Languages
  - Official: Bengali, English
- Time zone: UTC+5:30 (IST)
- ISO 3166 code: IN-WB
- Vehicle registration: WB
- Lok Sabha constituency: Serampore
- Vidhan Sabha constituency: Chanditala
- Website: wb.gov.in

Alipur is a village in Chanditala I community development block of Srirampore subdivision in Hooghly district in the Indian state of West Bengal.

== Geography ==
Alipur is located at 22.7130601°N 88.18873°E.

=== Gram panchayat ===
Villages and census towns in Nababpur gram panchayat are: Alipur, Dudhkalmi, Nababpur and Pakur.

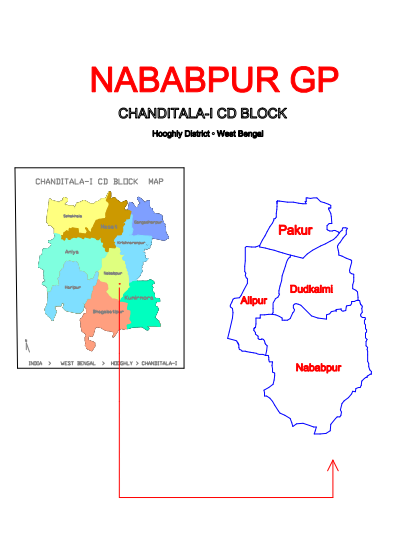
MAP OF NABABPUR GP

== Demographics ==
At the 2011 Census of India, Alipur had a population of 3,091 of which 1,585 (51%) were males and 1,506 (49%) were females. Population below 6 years was 302. The total number of literates in Alipur was 2,467 (88.45% of the population over 6 years).
