= Ramanathpur =

- Census Town
- Location in West Bengal, India Ramanathpur (India)
- Coordinates: 22.6891065°N 88.2190668°E
- Country: India
- State: West Bengal
- District: Hooghly
- Nearest City: Serampore

Population (2011)
  - Total: 6,811

Languages
  - Official: Bengali, English
- Time zone: UTC+5:30 (IST)
- PIN: 712704
- Vehicle registration: WB
- Lok Sabha constituency: Serampore
- Vidhan Sabha constituency: Chanditala
- Website: wb.gov.in

Ramanathpur is a census town in Chanditala I CD Block in Srirampore subdivision of Hooghly district in the state of West Bengal, India.

== Geography ==
Cities and towns in Chanditala I, Chanditala II and Jangipara CD Blocks in Srirampore subdivision in Hooghly district
M: municipal city/ town, CT: census town, R: rural/ urban centre,
Owing to space constraints in the small map, the actual locations in a larger map may vary slightly

=== Location ===
Ramanathpur is located at 22.68910°N 88.21906°E.

Gangadharpur, Manirampur, Masat, Jangalpara, Dudhkalmi, Nababpur, Bhagabatipur, Kumirmora and Ramanathpur form a cluster of census towns in Chanditala I CD Block.

=== Urbanisation ===
Srirampore subdivision is the most urbanized of the subdivisions in Hooghly district. 73.13% of the population in the subdivision is urban and 26.88% is rural. The subdivision has 6 municipalities and 34 census towns. The municipalities are: Uttarpara Kotrung Municipality, Konnagar Municipality, Serampore Municipality, Baidyabati Municipality, Rishra Municipality and Dankuni Municipality. Amongst the CD Blocks in the subdivision, Uttarapara Serampore (census towns shown in a separate map) had 76% urban population, Chanditala I 42%, Chanditala II 69% and Jangipara 7% (census towns shown in the map above). All places marked in the map are linked in the larger full screen map.

== Demographics ==
As per 2011 Census of India, Ramnathpur had a population of 6,811 of which 3,370 (49%) were males and 3,441 (51%) were females. Population below 6 years was 677. The number of literates in Ramnathpur was 5,227 (85.22% of the population over 6 years).

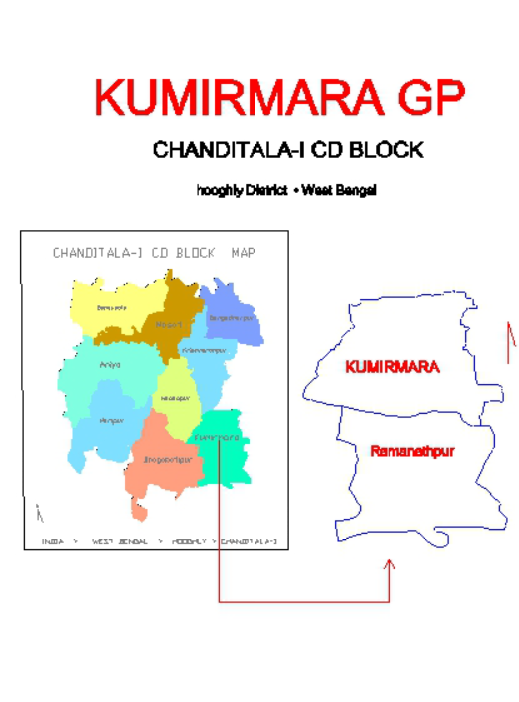
Map of KUMIRMARA GP

== Transport ==
Gobra railway station on Howrah-Bardhaman chord line is the nearest railway station.
