= Dudhkalmi =

- Census Town
- Location in West Bengal, India Dudhkalmi (India)
- Coordinates: 22.71833°N 88.1992451°E
- Country: India
- State: West Bengal
- District: Hooghly
- Nearest City: Serampore

Population (2011)
  - Total: 5,558

Languages
  - Official: Bengali, English
- Time zone: UTC+5:30 (IST)
- Vehicle registration: WB
- Lok Sabha constituency: Serampore
- Vidhan Sabha constituency: Chanditala
- Website: wb.gov.in

Dudhkalmi is a census town in Chanditala I CD Block in Srirampore subdivision of Hooghly district in the state of West Bengal, India.

== Geography ==
Cities and towns in Chanditala I, Chanditala II and Jangipara CD Blocks in Srirampore subdivision in Hooghly district
M: municipal city/ town, CT: census town, R: rural/ urban centre,
Owing to space constraints in the small map, the actual locations in a larger map may vary slightly

=== Location ===
Dudhkalmi is located at 22.71833°N 88.19924°E.

Gangadharpur, Manirampur, Masat, Jangalpara, Dudhkalmi, Nababpur, Bhagabatipur, Kumirmora and Ramanathpur form a cluster of census towns in Chanditala I CD Block.

=== Urbanisation ===
Srirampore subdivision is the most urbanized of the subdivisions in Hooghly district. 73.13% of the population in the subdivision is urban and the rest is rural. The subdivision has 6 municipalities and 34 census towns. The municipalities are: Uttarpara Kotrung Municipality, Konnagar Municipality, Serampore Municipality, Baidyabati Municipality, Rishra Municipality and Dankuni Municipality. Amongst the CD Blocks in the subdivision, Uttarapara Serampore (census towns shown in a separate map) had 76% urban population, Chanditala I 42%, Chanditala II 69% and Jangipara 7% (census towns shown in the map above). All places marked in the map are linked in the larger full screen map.

=== Gram panchayat ===
Villages and census towns in Nababpur gram panchayat are: Alipur, Dudhkalmi, Nababpur and Pakur.

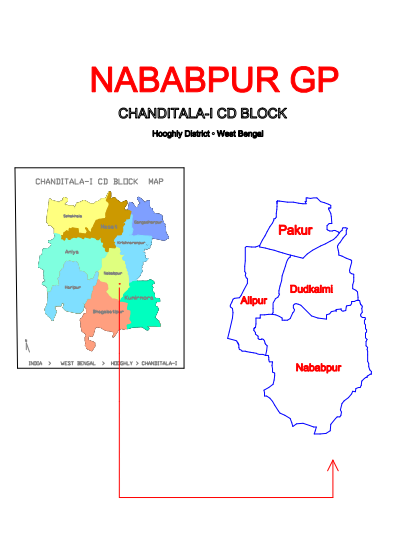
MAP OF NABABPUR GP

== Demographics ==
As per 2011 Census of India Dudhkalmi had a total population of 5,558 of which 2,628 (47%) were males and 2,930 (53%) were females. Population below 6 years was 664. The total number of literates in Dudhkalmi was 4,130 (84.39% of the population over 6 years).

== Transport ==
Janai Road railway station on Howrah-Bardhaman chord line is the nearest railway station.
