= Gangadharpur =

- Census town
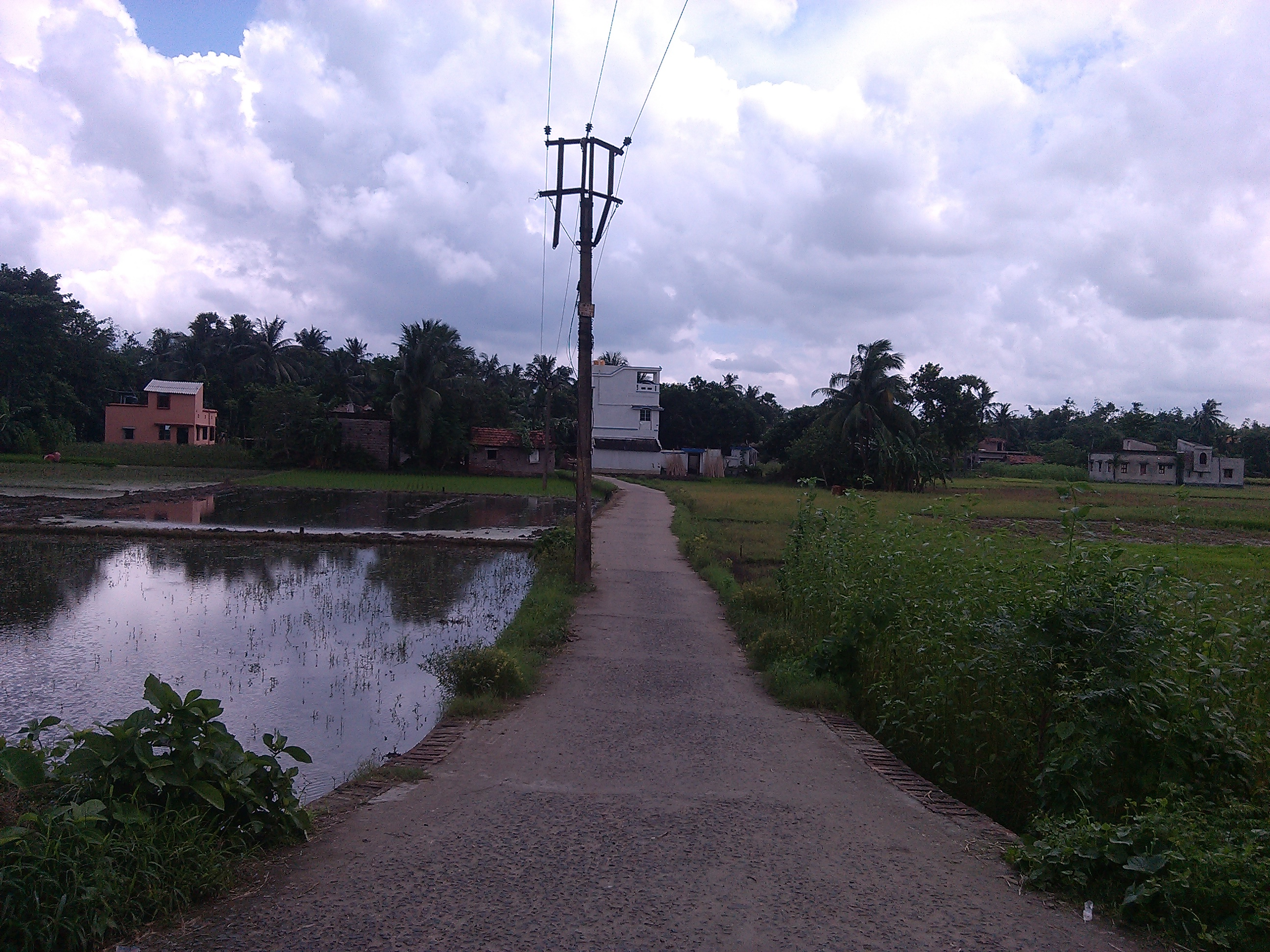
- Gangadharpur street view

- Location in West Bengal, India Gangadharpur (India)
- Coordinates: 22.76°N 88.22°E
- Country: India
- State: West Bengal
- District: Hooghly
- Nearest city: Serampore

Government
  - Type: Gram panchayat
  - Body: Gangadharpur gram panchayat

Area
  - Total: 2.19 km^{2} (0.85 sq mi)
- Elevation: 14 m (46 ft)

Population (2011)
  - Total: 7,862
  - Density: 3,590/km^{2} (9,300/sq mi)

Languages
  - Official: Bengali, English
- Time zone: UTC+5:30 (IST)
- PIN: 712306
- Telephone code: 03212
- ISO 3166 code: IN-WB
- Vehicle registration: WB
- Sex ratio: 979 females/1000 males ♂/♀
- Literacy rate: 83.52 %
- Lok Sabha constituency: Serampore
- Vidhan Sabha constituency: Chanditala
- Website: Gangadharpur

Gangadharpur is a census town in the Chanditala I CD block located in the Srirampore subdivision of the Hooghly district in the state of West Bengal, India.

== Geography ==
Map of Gangadharpur census town

Cities and towns in Chanditala I, Chanditala II and Jangipara CD blocks in Srirampore subdivision in Hooghly district
M: municipal city/ town, CT: census town, R: rural/ urban centre.
Owing to space constraints in the small map, the actual locations in a larger map may vary slightly.

=== Location ===
Gangadharpur is located at 22°46′N 88°13′E. It has an elevation of 14 metres (46 feet) and is located in the Chanditala–I community development block under the Srirampore subdivision of the Hooghly district. The Chanditala police station serves this town. There is a small river in the locale that is called Kana Nadi "(Bengali:কানা নদী)", which means "blind river."

It is 26 km from the district headquarters of Hooghly and 30 km from the state capital Kolkata.

According to the District Census Handbook of 2011, Gangadharpur covered an area of 2.193 km^{2}.

Gangadharpur, Manirampur, Masat, Jangalpara, Dudhkalmi, Nababpur, Bhagabatipur, Kumirmora and Ramanathpur form a cluster of census towns in the Chanditala I CD block.

=== Urbanisation ===
The Srirampore subdivision is the most urbanized of the subdivisions in Hooghly district. 73.13% of the population lives in urban area and 26.88% lives in rural areas. The subdivision has six municipalities and 34 census towns. The municipalities are Uttarpara Kotrung Municipality, Konnagar Municipality, Serampore Municipality, Baidyabati Municipality, Rishra Municipality and Dankuni Municipality. Amongst the CD blocks in the subdivision, Uttarapara Serampore had a population that was 76% urban, Chanditala I am population that was 42% urban, Chanditala II a population that was 69% urban and Jangipara a population that was 7% urban.

=== Gram panchayat ===
The Gangadharpur gram panchayat is the local self-government of the village. The panchayat is divided into wards, each represented by an elected ward member. The ward members are headed by a sarpanch.

Map of Gangadharpur GP, showing Mouzas

The villages and census towns in Gangadharpur gram panchayat are Bankrishnapur, Gangadharpur, Malipukur and Manirampur.

== Area ==
Gangadharpur has an area of 2.19 km^{2}.

=== Market ===
The Ganngadharpur Bazaar caters to the town.

Map of Chanditala-I CD block, showing GP

== Demographics ==
As of 2011, Gangadharpur had a population of 7,862. Males constituted 51% of the population and females 49%. Gangadharpur had an average literacy rate of 83.5%, higher than the state average of 76.26%; with 87.72% of the literates being male and 79.27% being female. Nine percent of the population was under 6 years of age.

=== Dankuni Urban Agglomeration ===
As per the 2011 census, the Dankuni Urban Agglomeration includes Dankuni (M), Purba Tajpur (CT), Kharsarai (CT), Begampur (CT), Chikrand (CT), Pairagachha (CT), Barijhati (CT), Garalgachha (CT), Krishnapur (CT), Baruipara (CT), Borai (CT), Nawapara (CT), Basai (CT), Gangadharpur (CT), Manirampur (CT), Janai (CT), Kapashanria (CT), Jaykrishnapur (CT), Tisa (CT), Baksa (CT), Panchghara (CT) and Naiti (CT).

== Politics ==
Kalyan Banerjee of All India Trinamool Congress is the representative in Parliament, and Swati Khandekar of All India Trinamool Congress is the Member of Legislative Assembly.

== Festivals ==
Like other parts of West Bengal, Durga Puja is the biggest festival of Gangadharpur. Kali Puja is one of the famous festivals celebrated in Gangadharpur. Additionally, Lakshmi Puja, Viswakarma Puja, Saraswati Puja, Poila Boisakh-Ganesh Puja, Kartik Puja and Dol Yatra are widely celebrated at Gangadharpur.

=== Temples ===
- Siv temple (Nimtala Gangadharpur south)
- Durga Temple (Mannapara, Gangadharpur south)
- Tarama Temple (Santrapara, Gangadharpur south )
- Kali Temple (Gangadharpur Bazaar)
- Radha Gobindo Temple (Radha Gobindo Tala, Gangadharpur Bazaar)
- Sitola Temple (Manna para Gangadharpur south)
- Shubochandi Temple (Shubochanditala Gangadharpur)

=== Ashrams ===
- Saradaghata Ashram (Pakirapara Gangadharpur south)
- Kultala Ashram (Daspara Gangadharpur south)
Gangadharpur

== Transport ==
Transportation is mainly based on public transport like bus services and small vehicles like autos.

=== Air ===
The nearest airport is the Netaji Subhas Chandra Bose International Airport in Dum Dum, Kolkata.

=== Rail ===
The nearest railway station, Baruipara railway station, on the Howrah-Bardhaman chord line, is 26 km from Howrah Station and is a part of the Kolkata Suburban Railway system.

=== Road ===
The main road is 31 Number Road. It is the main artery of the town and it is connected with Ahilyabai Holkar Road (Sehakhala), National Highway 19 (Bora), State Highway 13 (Milki Badamtala) and State Highway 6/ G.T. Road (Nabagram).

There is 31 Number Private Bus from Jangipara bus stand to Serampore bus stand via Furfura Sharif, Sehakhala, Banmalipur, Gangadharpur, Baruipara, Bora and Milki Badamtala. Another road renovated under Gangadharpur-Singur Road is connected to State Highway 2. There is auto and trecker service from Singur and Baruipara to Masat via Gangadharpur. Gangadharpur-Jangalpara Road is also connected with State Highway 15.

== Economy ==
=== Textiles ===
Gangadharpur's textile industry is the main cotton weaving center in West Bengal. They are involved in the weaving of fine-textured saris and dhotis. The saris of Gangadharpur have deep and bright colours.

=== Other livelihoods ===
Most of the people are goldsmiths, and the rest are dependent on farming, with a few service men.

== Healthcare ==
Gangdharpur has a Primary Health Centre with 10 beds.

== Gallery ==
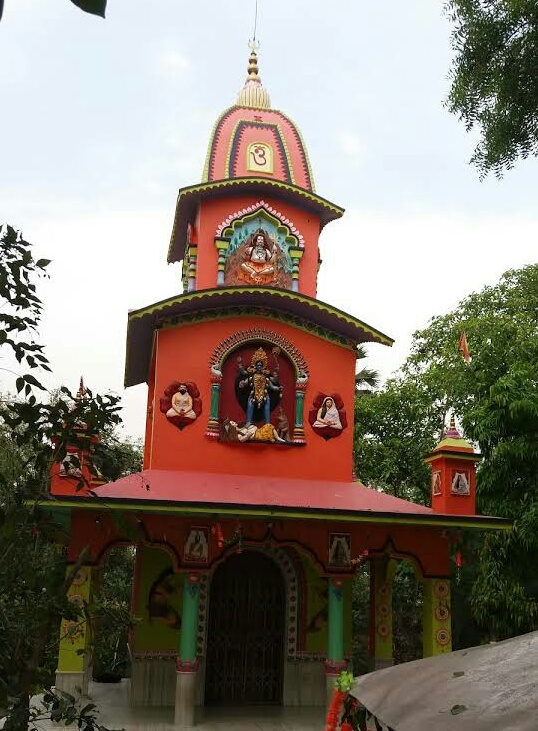
Kultala Ashram Gangadharpur

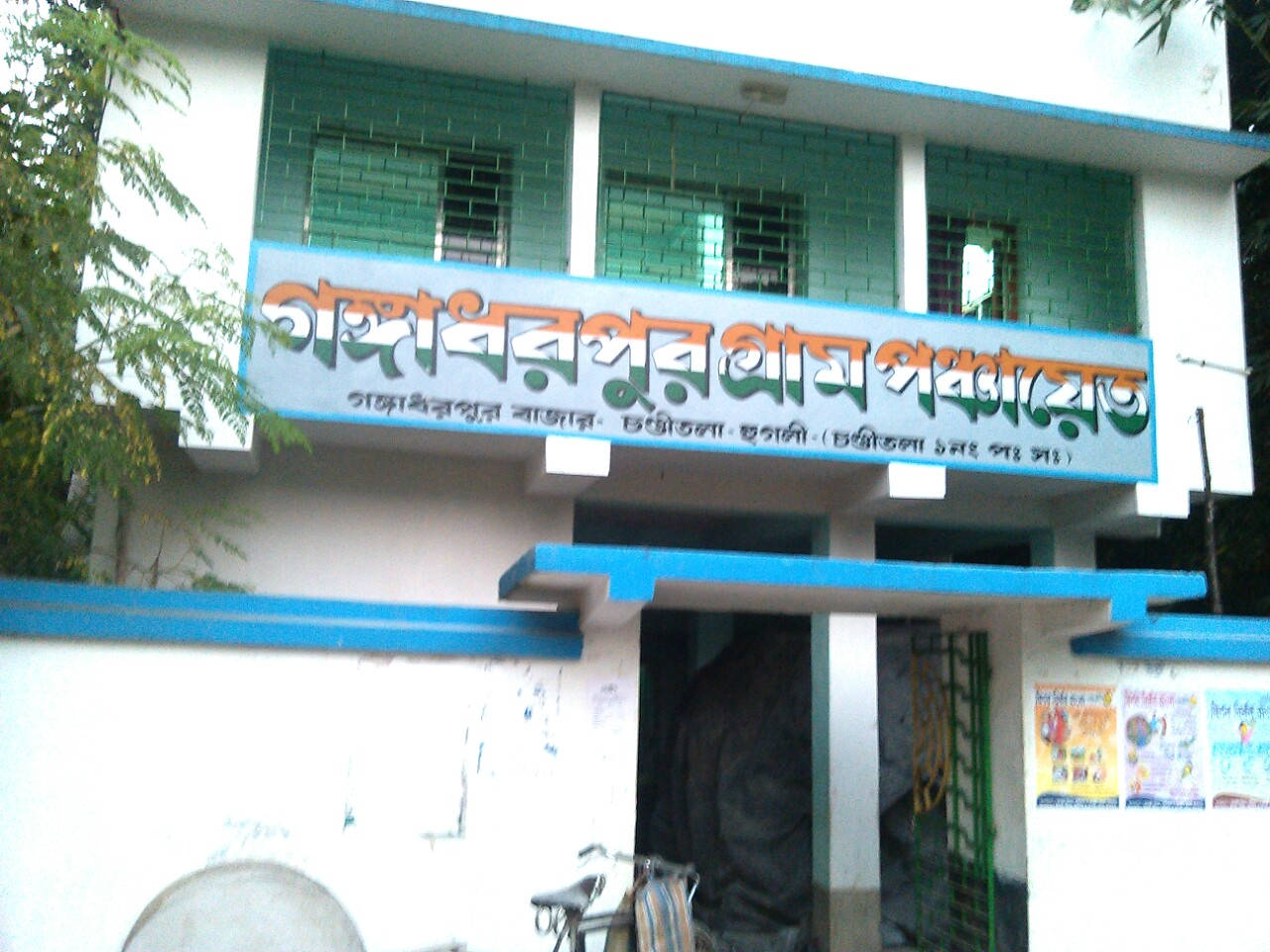
Gangadharpur gram panchayat

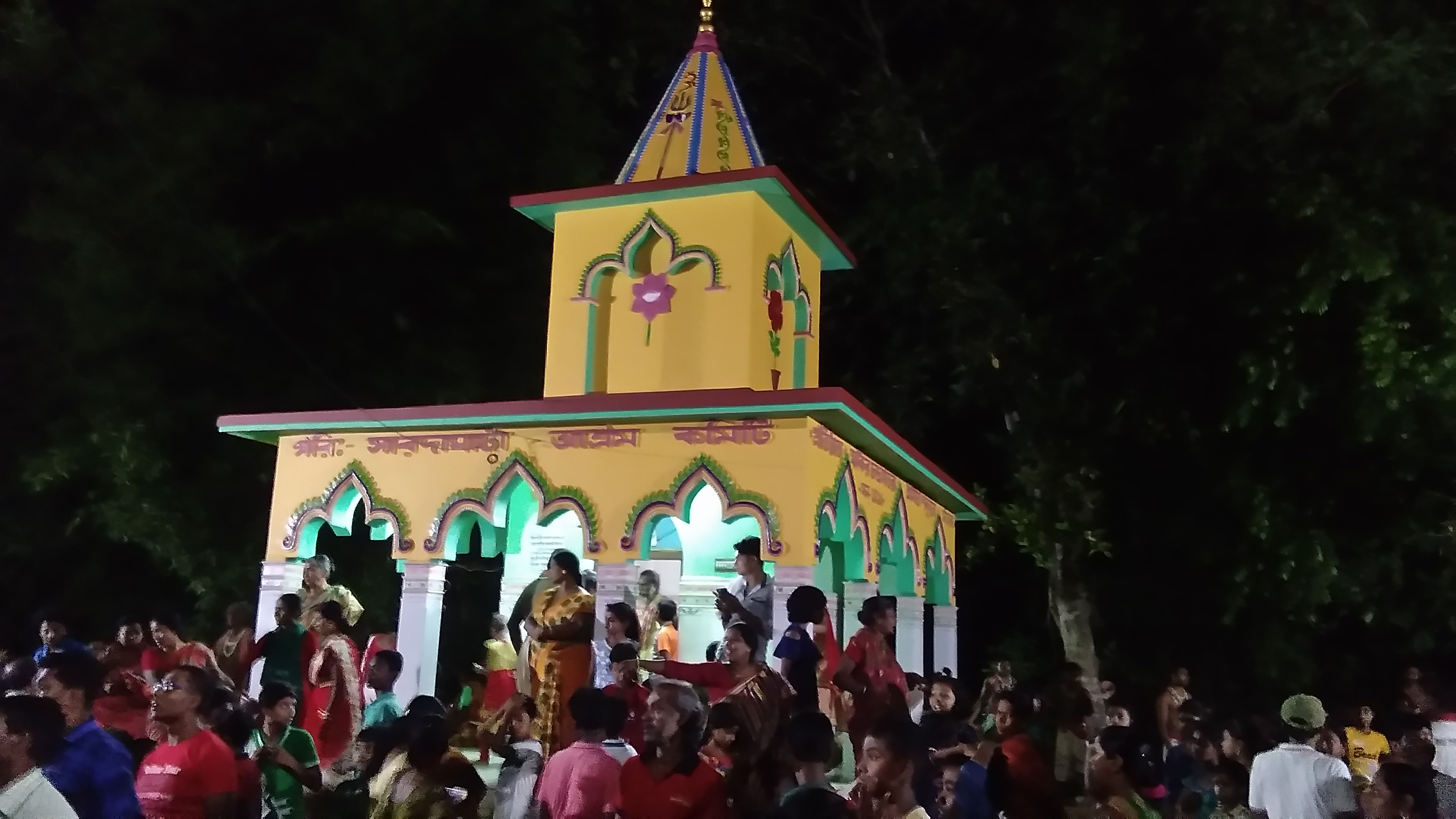
Gangadharpur Saradaghata Asharam

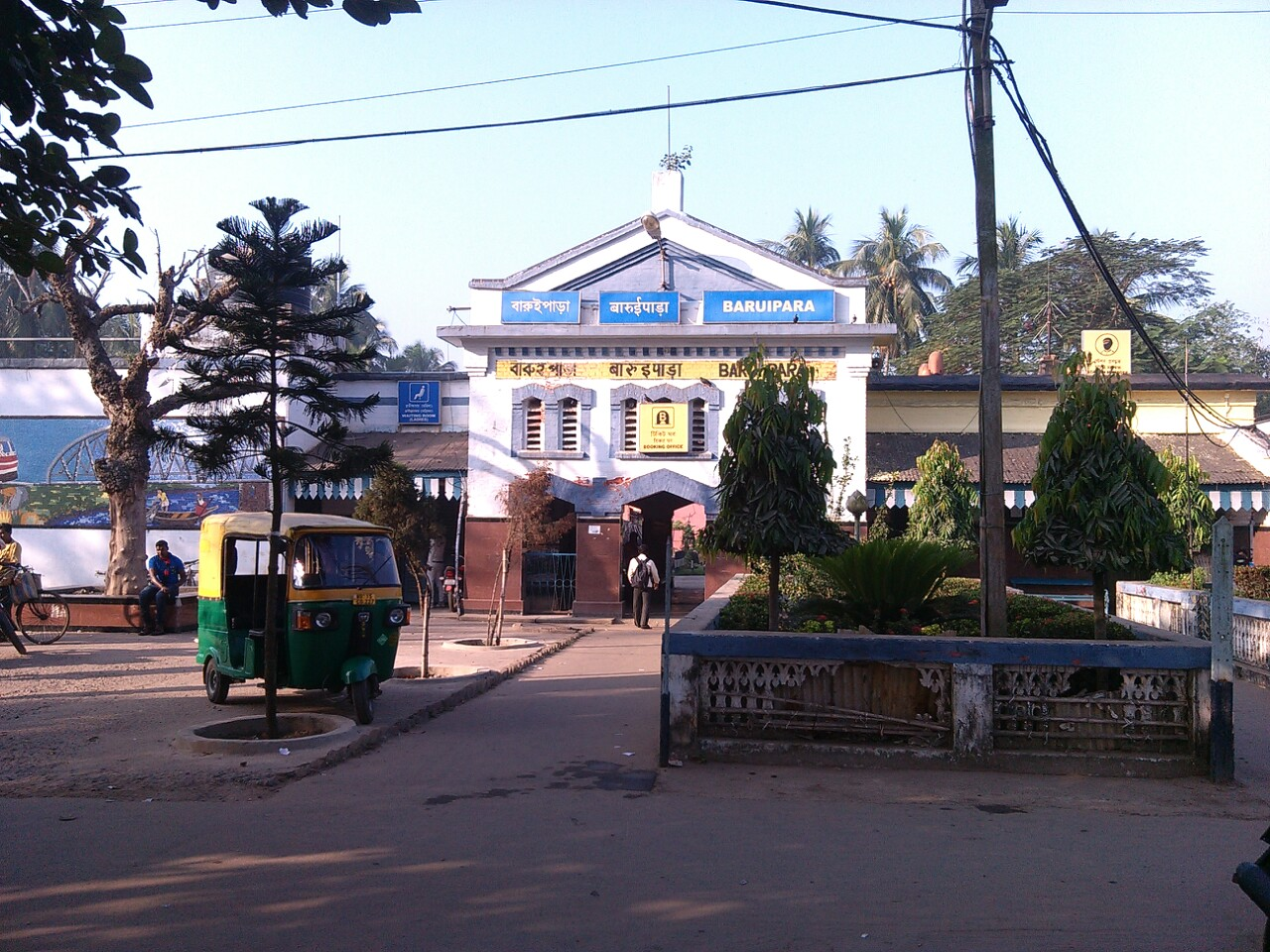
Baruipara railway station is 1.5 km from Gangadharpur.

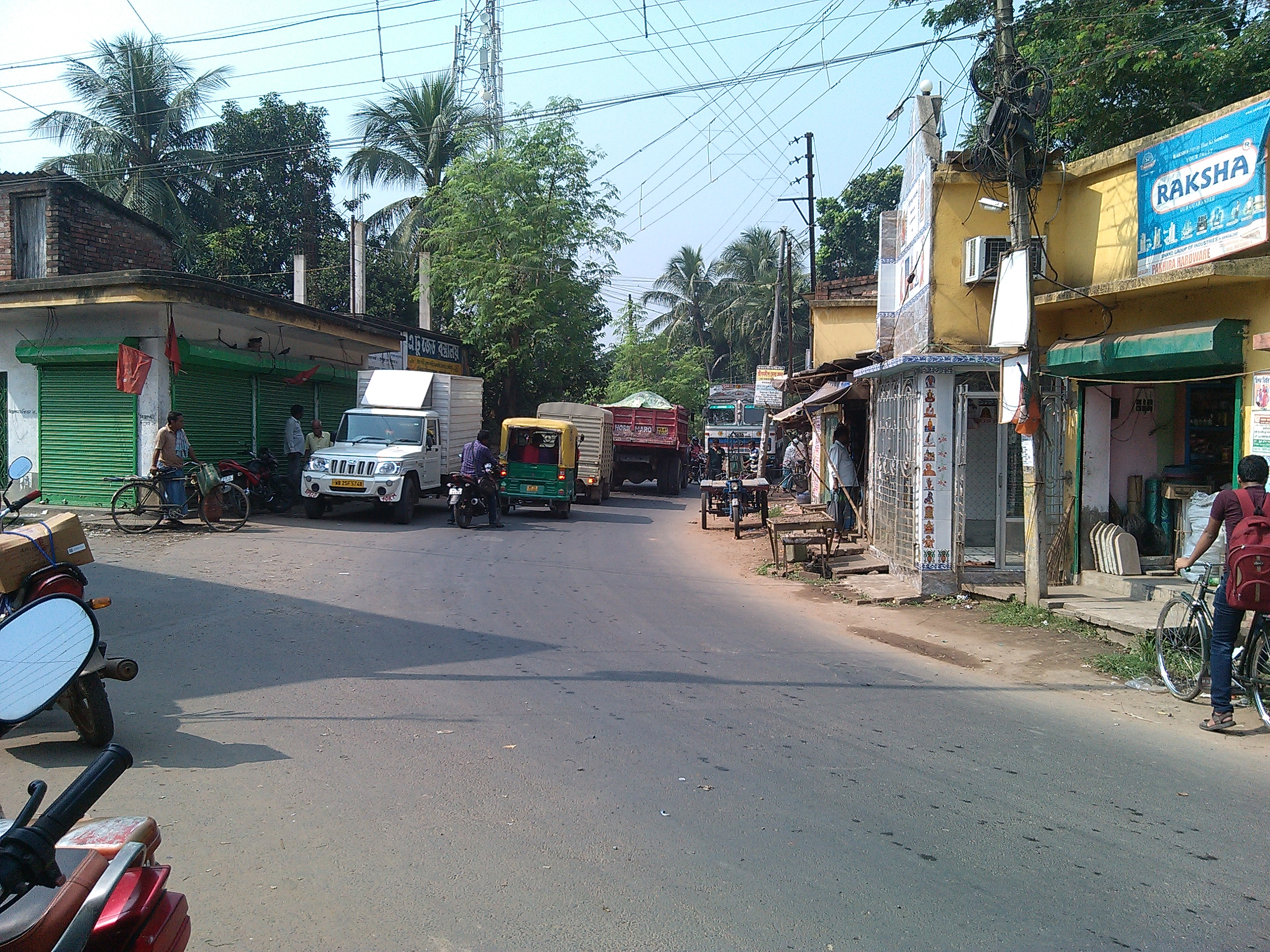
Gangadharpur Bazaar, 31 Number Road, Hooghly

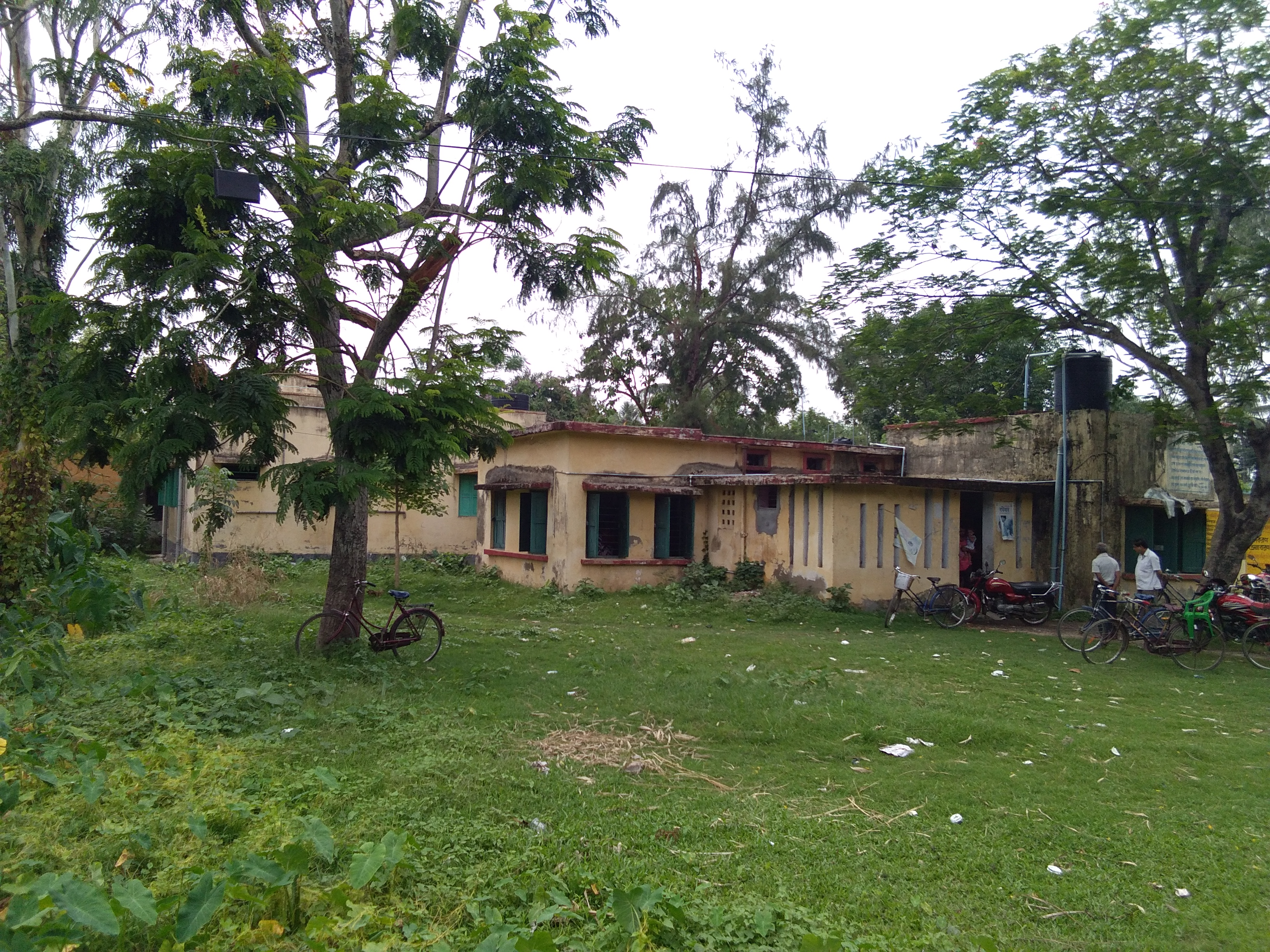
Gangadharpur Primary Health Centre

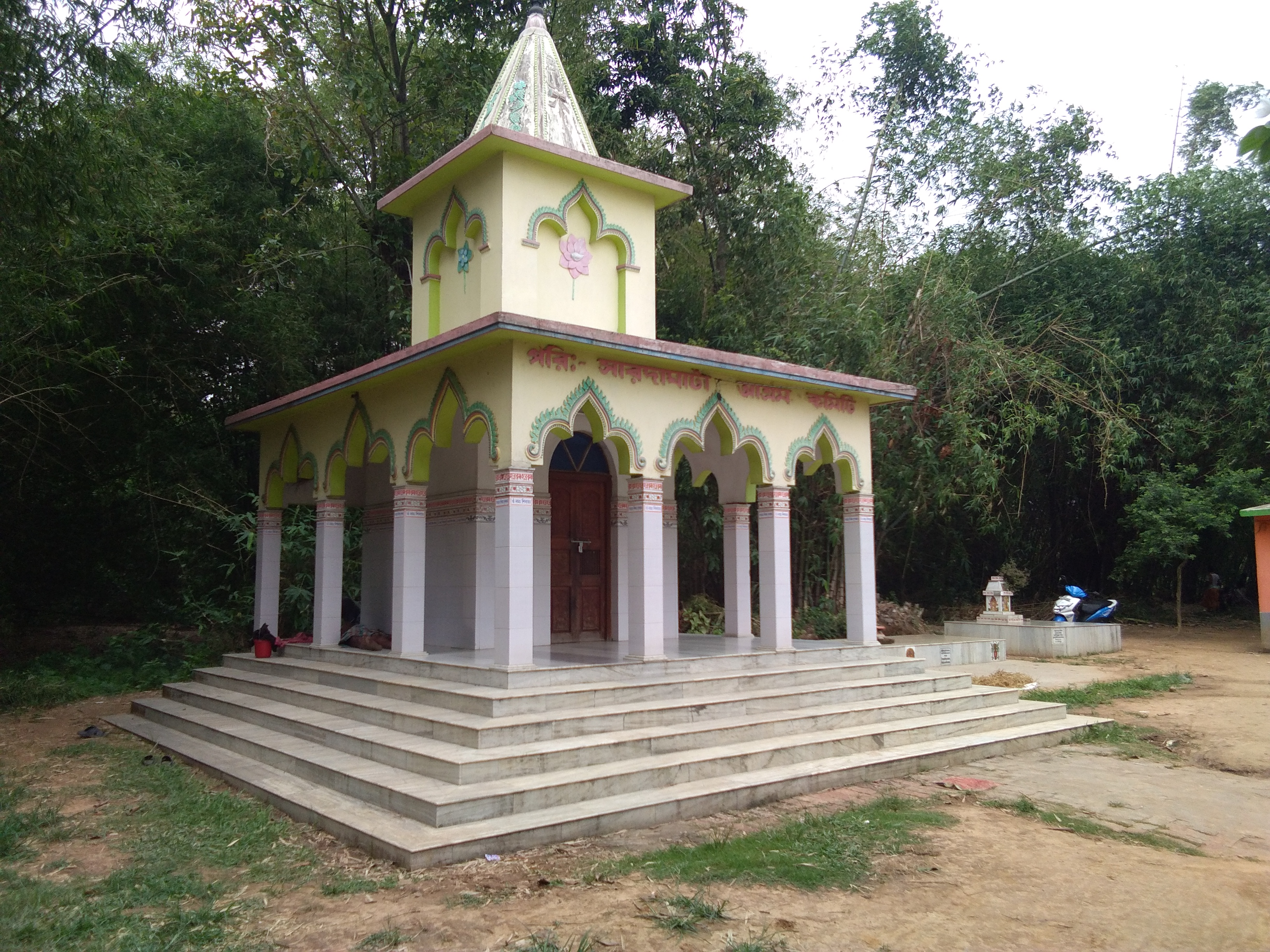
Gangadharpur Saradaghata Ashram

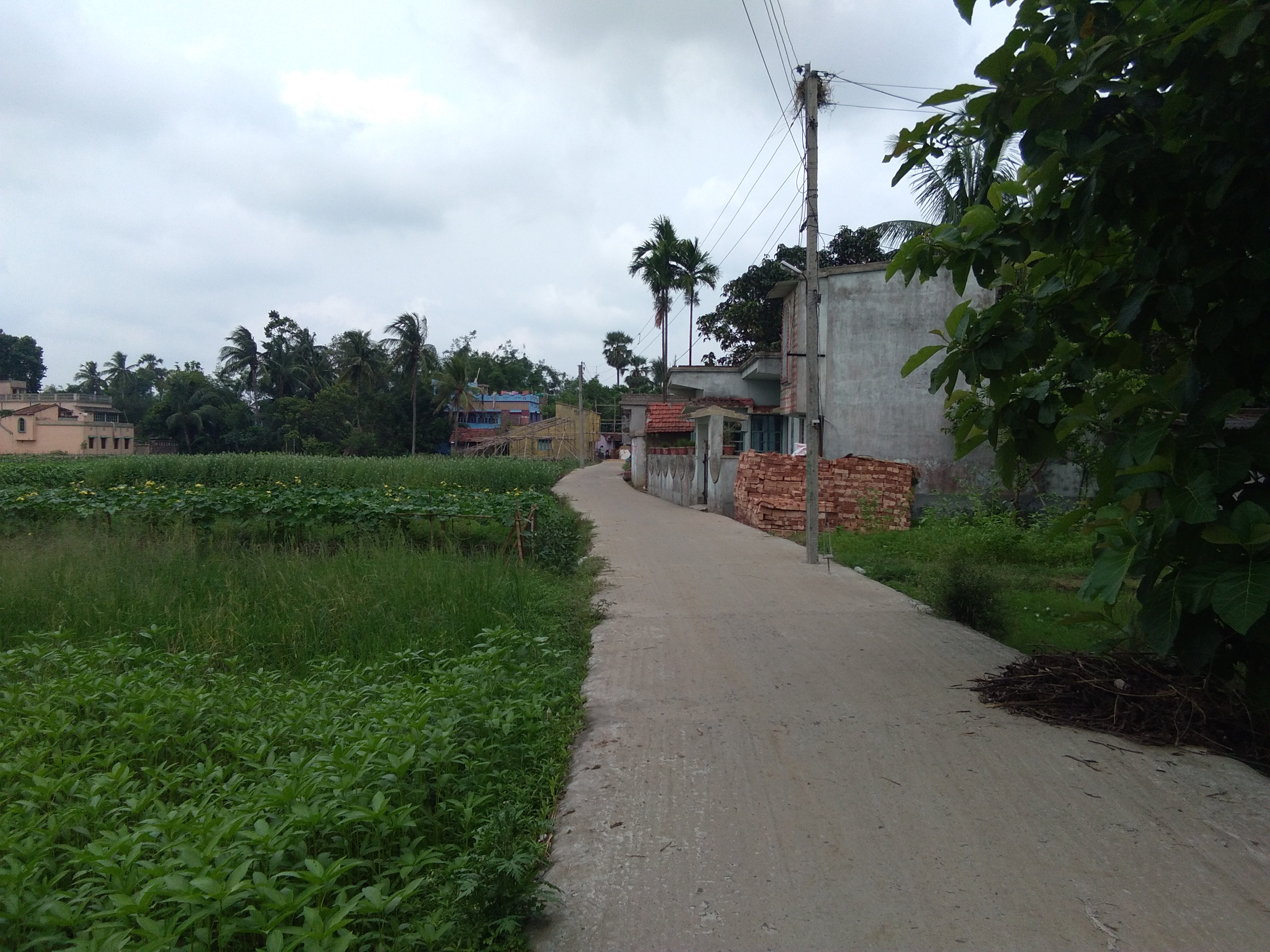
Gangadharpur street view

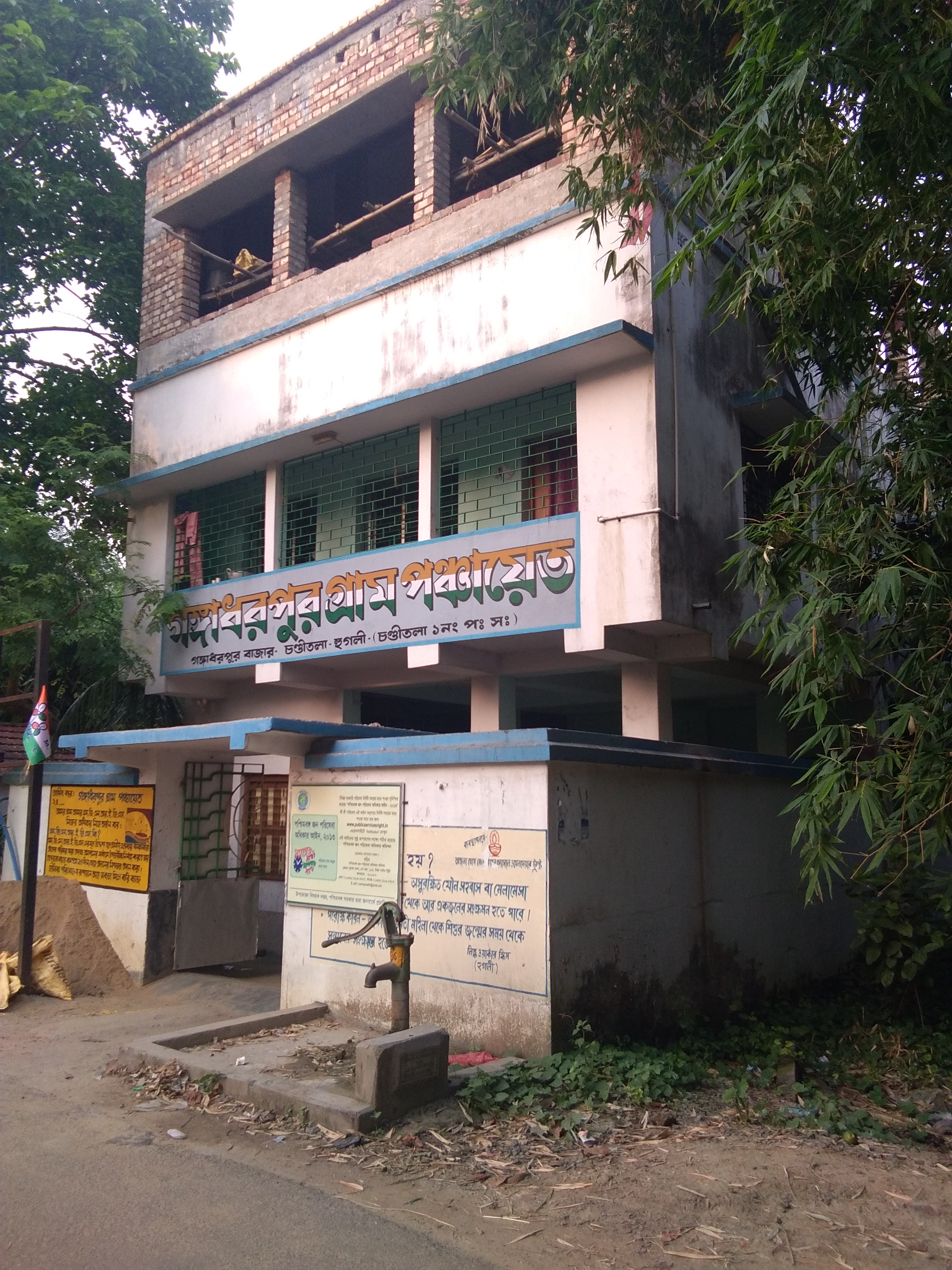
Gangadharpur gram panchayat
