= Pakur, Hooghly =

Pakur
- Village
- Location in West Bengal, India Pakur (India)
- Coordinates: 22.7196402°N 88.1946309°E
- Country: India
- State: West Bengal
- District: Hooghly

Government
  - Body: Gram panchayat

Population (2011)
  - Total: 3,997

Languages
  - Official: Bengali, English
- Time zone: UTC+5:30 (IST)
- PIN: 712702 (Mosat)
- ISO 3166 code: IN-WB
- Vehicle registration: WB
- Lok Sabha constituency: Serampore
- Vidhan Sabha constituency: Chanditala
- Website: wb.gov.in

Pakur is a village in Chanditala I community development block of Srirampore subdivision in Hooghly district in the Indian state of West Bengal.

== Geography ==
Pakur is located at 22.7196402°N 88.1946309°E.

=== Gram panchayat ===
Villages and census towns in Nababpur gram panchayat, in addition to Pakur, are: Alipur, Dudhkalmi and Nababpur.

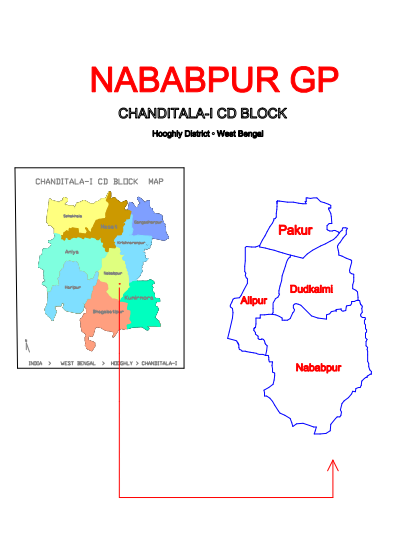
MAP OF NABABPUR GP

== Demographics ==
As per 2011 Census of India Pakur had a population of 3,997 of which 1,939 (49%) were males and 2,058 (51%) were females. Population below 6 years was 346. The number of literates in Pakur was 3,161 (86.58% of the population over 6 years).

== Culture ==
Pakur Tarun Sahitya Mandir is a rural library established in 1943 built in part Mr. Gora Mukhopadhyay and Tarak Mukherjee.
