= Krishnarampur =

- Village
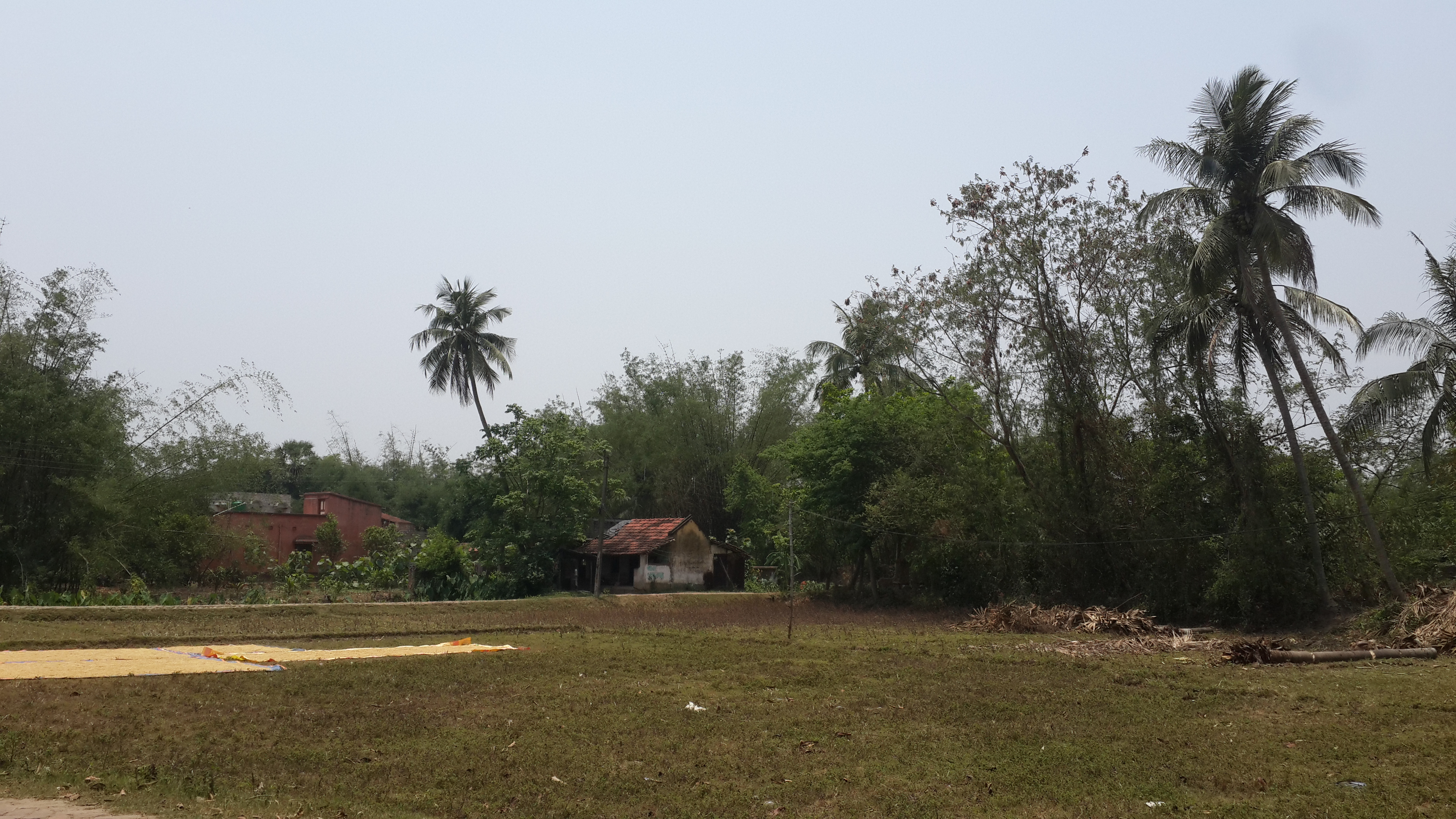

- Location in West Bengal, India Krishnarampur (India)
- Coordinates: 22.721831°N 88.216765°E
- Country india: India
- State: West Bengal
- District: Hooghly

Government
  - Type: Panchayati raj (India)
  - Body: Gram panchayat

Population (2011)
  - Total: 10,044

Languages
  - Official: Bengali, English
- Time zone: UTC+5:30 (IST)
- ISO 3166 code: IN-WB
- Vehicle registration: WB
- Lok Sabha constituency: Serampore
- Vidhan Sabha constituency: Chanditala
- Website: wb.gov.in

Krishnarampur (কৃষ্ণরামপুর) is a village and a gram panchayat in Chanditala I community development block in Srirampore subdivision of Hooghly district in the state of West Bengal, India. It is under Chanditala police station.

Before Krishnarampur, whose name was "Kristorampur (কৃষ্টরামপুর)". It is believed that the name was changed after the independence and partition of India in 1947. At that time rice was very popular here. There were many big rice warehouses here. From all the unique areas, bullock carts used to come here to buy and sell paddy rice, then from Krishnarampur to Howrah rice was traded through Martin's Light Railways (MLR).

Between 1907-1908, Martin's Light Railways (MLR) was fully operational here from Howrah to Shiakhala.

Until 1947 it was run by the British government and Martin.co. These have been run privately since the country became independent in 1947. This railway line was finally closed in 1971.

Between 1907-1908, Martin's Light Railways (MLR) was fully operational here from Howrah to Shiakhala.

== Geography ==
Krishnarampur is located at 22.721831°N 88.216765°E. On its north side, Bankrishnapur, Manirampur and Kumragari situated; on its east side, Madhabpur, Khoragari, Duttapur, and Janai; on its south, Jagannathbati, Kumirmora, and Nawabpur; on its east, Dudhkalmi, Dhipa and Jangalpara situated.

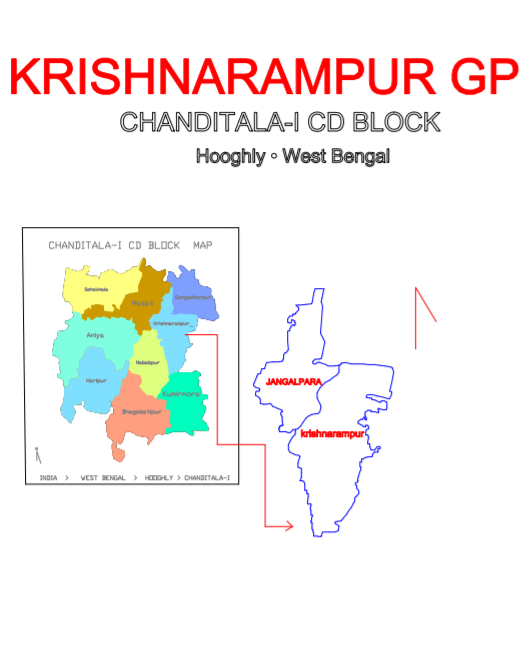
Map of KRISHNARAMPUR GP

=== Gram panchayat ===
Krisharampur Gram Panchayat is part of Chanditala 1 Panchayat Samity and Hooghly Zila Parishad in 3-tier Panchayati Raj systems.

Villages and census towns in Krishnarampur gram panchayat are: Krishnarampur and Jangalpara.

== Demographics ==
As per 2011 Census of India, Krishnarampur had a total population of 10,044 of which 5,024 (50%) were males and 5,020 (50%) were females. Population below 6 years was 912. The total number of literates in Krishnarampur was 7,734 (84.69% of the population over 6 years).

== Transport ==
- Railway

Baruipara railway station and Janai Road railway station are its nearest railway station on Howrah-Bardhaman chord, which is a part of the Kolkata Suburban Railway system.

- Road

The main road is SH 15 (Ahilyabai Holkar Road). It is the main artery of the village and it is connected to NH 19 (old numbering NH 2)/Durgapur Expressway.

- Bus

=== Private Bus ===
- 26 Bonhooghly - Champadanga
- 26A Serampore - Aushbati
- 26C Bonhooghly - Jagatballavpur

=== Bus Routes without Numbers ===
- Howrah Station - Bandar (Dhanyaghori)

== Krishnarampur gallery ==
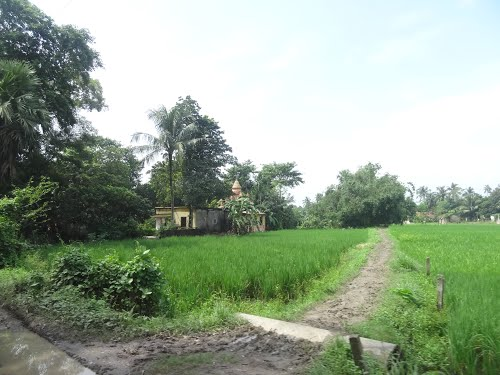

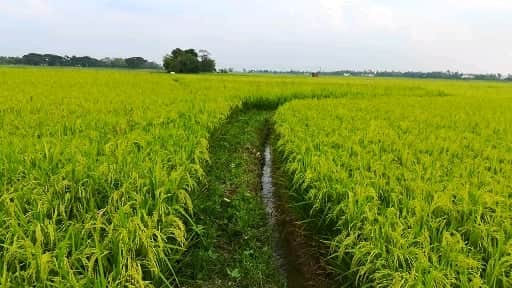

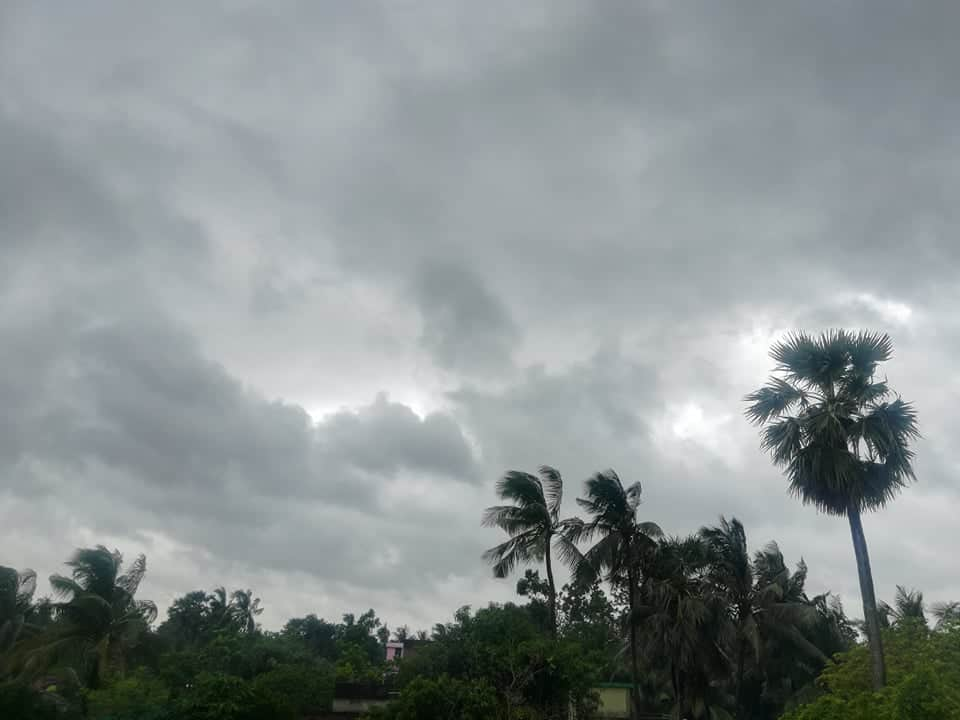

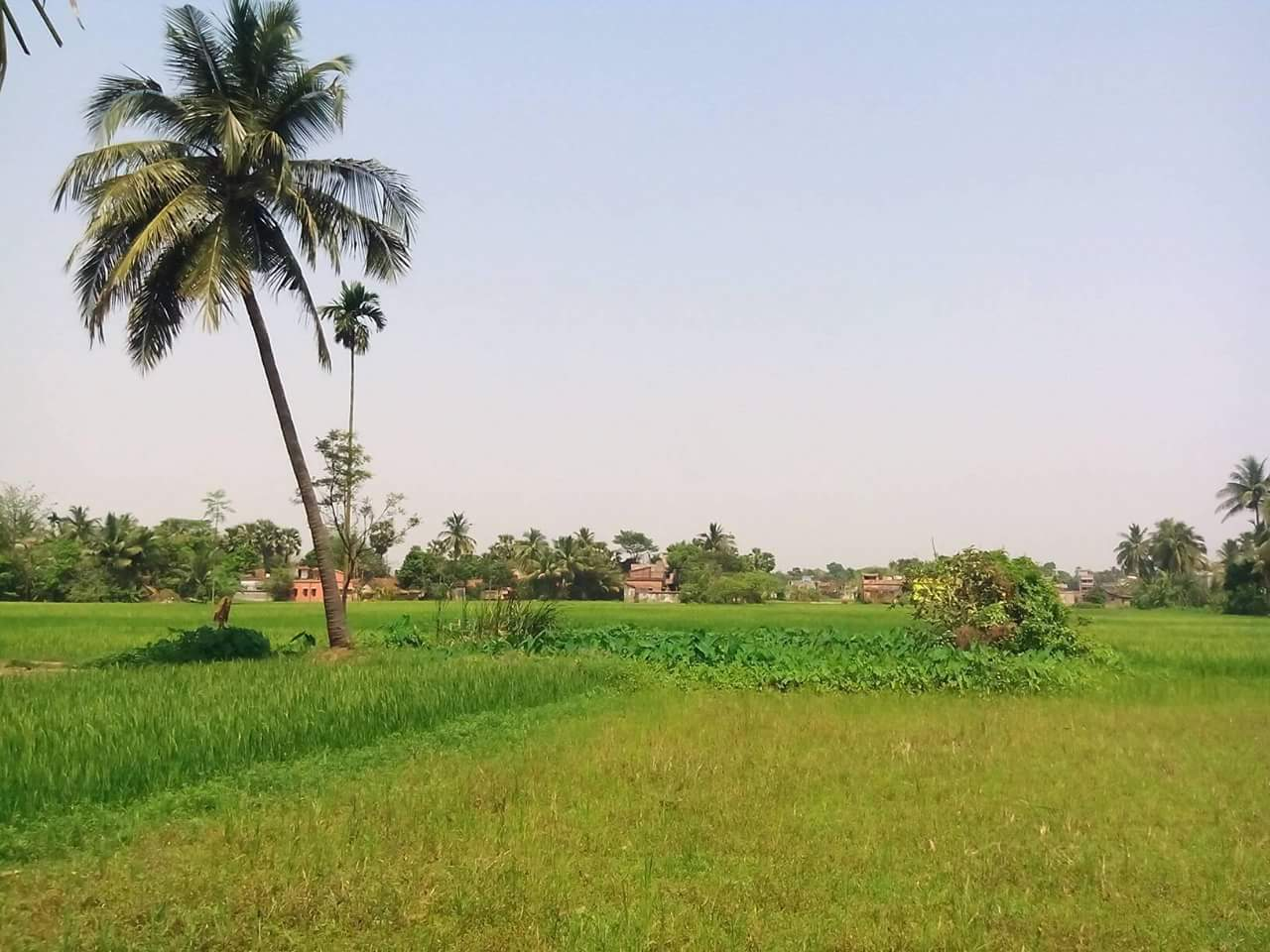

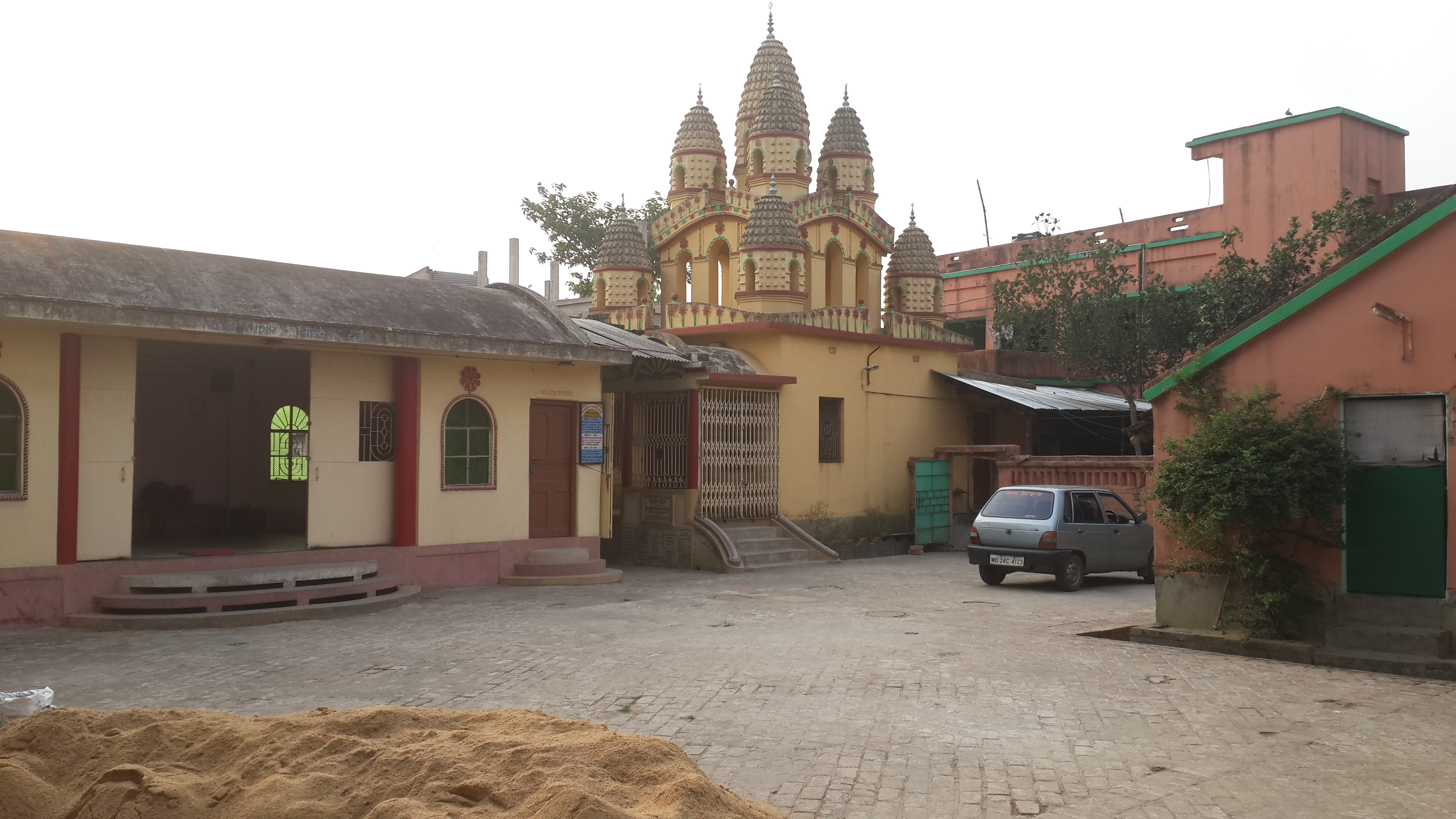

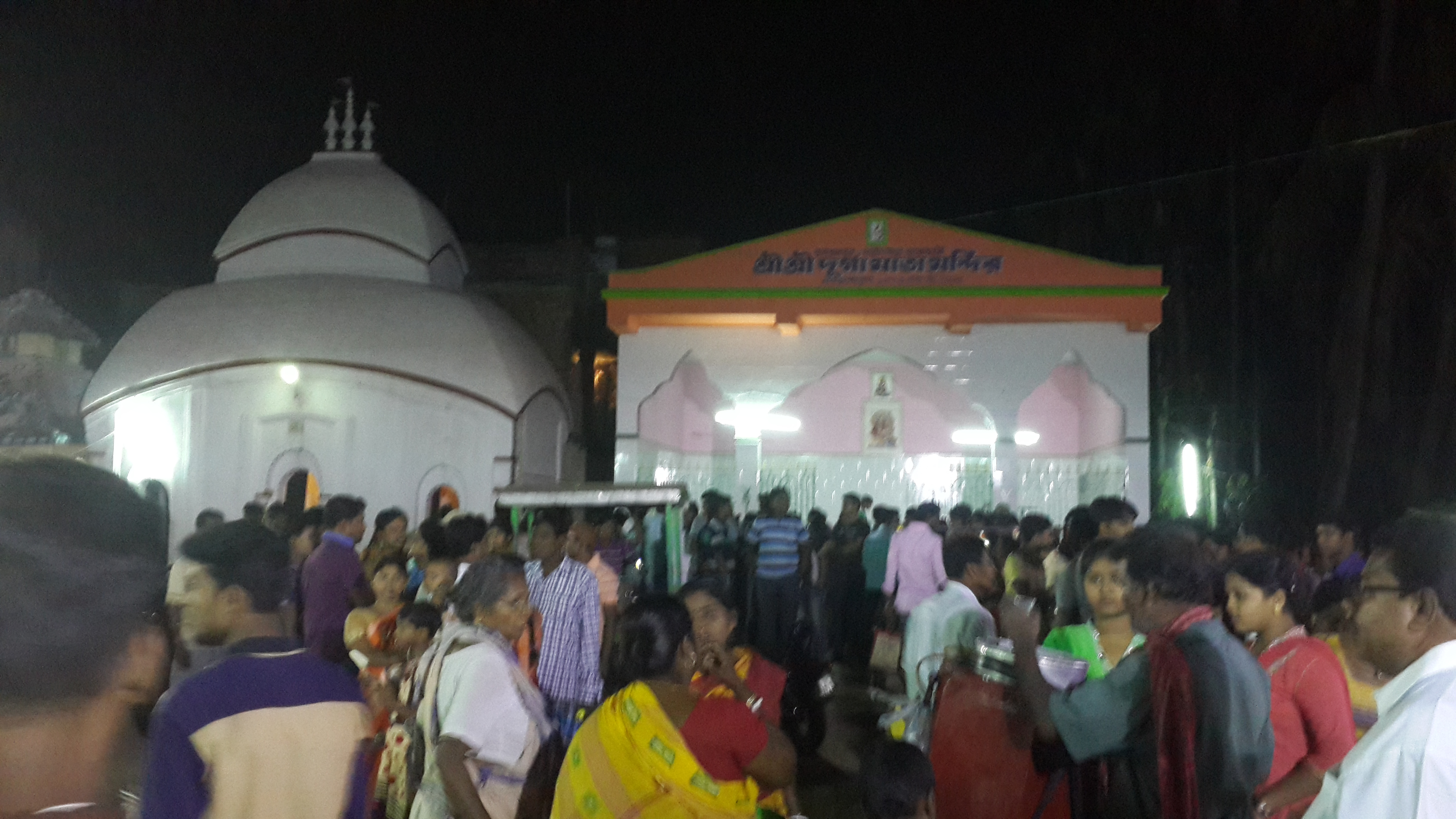

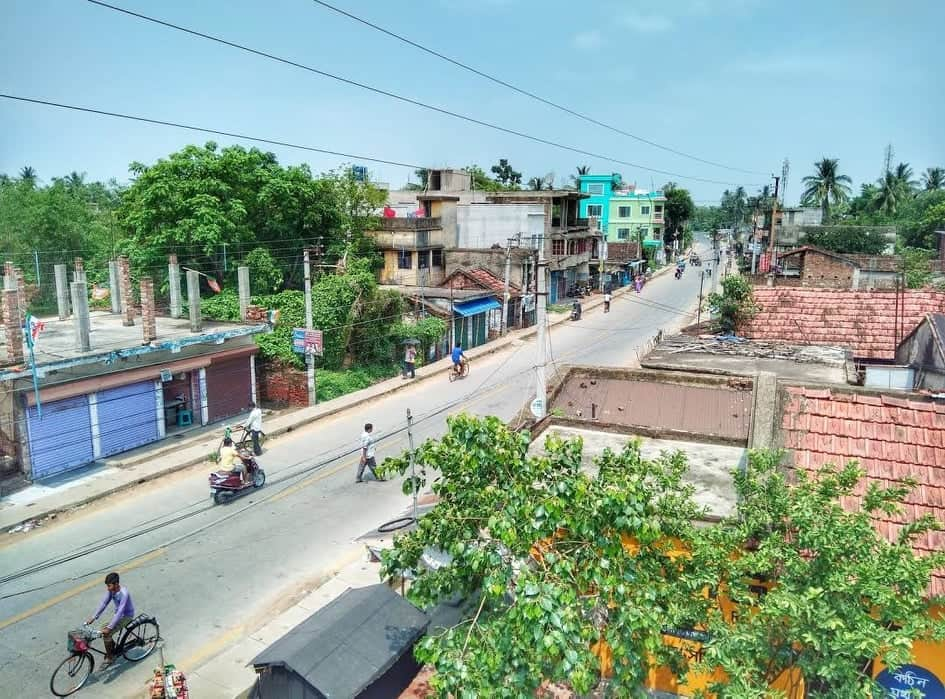

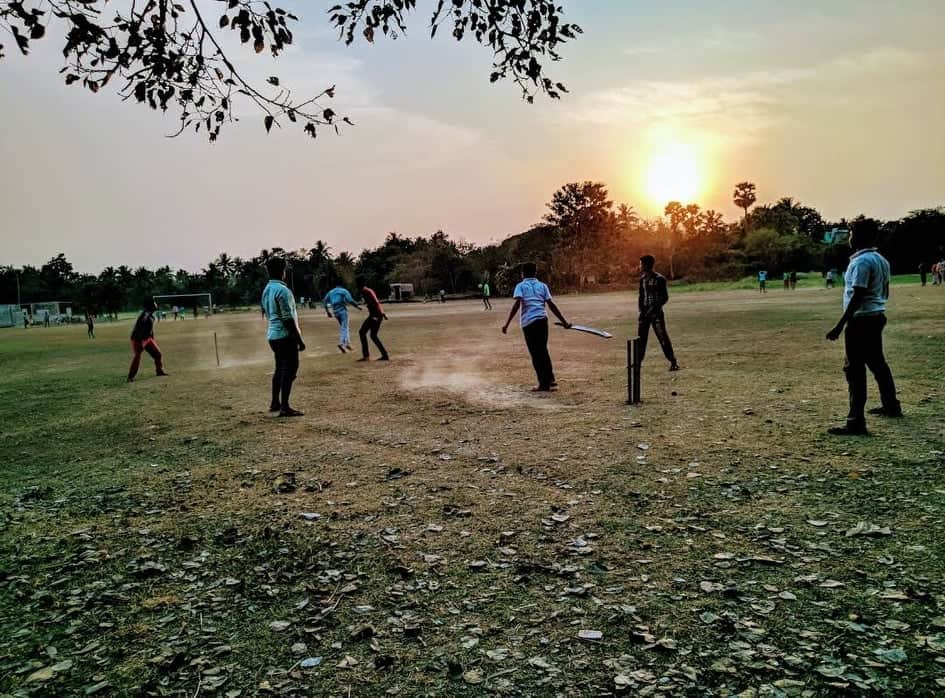
