= Bhagabatipur =

- Census Town
- Location in West Bengal, India Bhagabatipur (India)
- Coordinates: 22.6937623°N 88.193603°E
- Country: India
- State: West Bengal
- District: Hooghly
- Nearest City: Serampore

Population (2011)
  - Total: 7,068

Languages
  - Official: Bengali, English
- Time zone: UTC+5:30 (IST)
- PIN: 712701
- Vehicle registration: WB
- Lok Sabha constituency: Serampore
- Vidhan Sabha constituency: Chanditala
- Website: wb.gov.in

Bhagabatipur is a census town in Chanditala I CD Block in Srirampore subdivision of Hooghly district in the state of West Bengal, India.

== Geography ==
Cities and towns in Chanditala I, Chanditala II and Jangipara CD Blocks in Srirampore subdivision in Hooghly district
M: municipal city/ town, CT: census town, R: rural/ urban centre,
Owing to space constraints in the small map, the actual locations in a larger map may vary slightly

=== Location ===
Bhagabatipur is located at 22.69376°N 88.19360°E.

Gangadharpur, Manirampur, Masat, Jangalpara, Dudhkalmi, Nababpur, Bhagabatipur, Kumirmora and Ramanathpur form a cluster of census towns in Chanditala I CD Block.

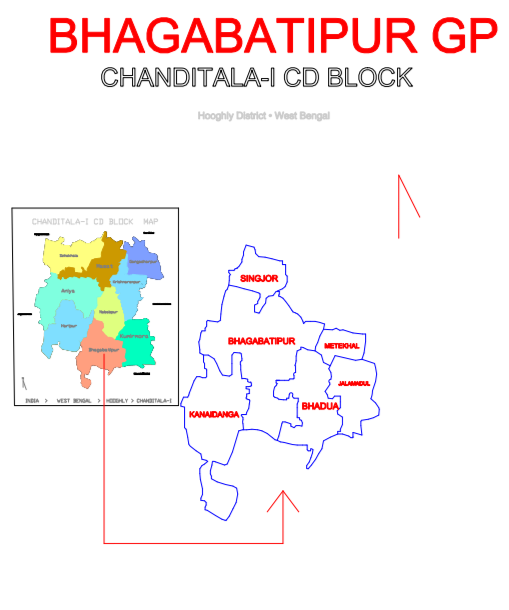
Map of BHAGABATIPUR GP

=== Urbanisation ===
Srirampore subdivision is the most urbanized of the subdivisions in Hooghly district. 73.13% of the population in the subdivision is urban and 26.88% is rural. The subdivision has 6 municipalities and 34 census towns. The municipalities are: Uttarpara Kotrung Municipality, Konnagar Municipality, Serampore Municipality, Baidyabati Municipality, Rishra Municipality and Dankuni Municipality. Amongst the CD Blocks in the subdivision, Uttarapara Serampore (census towns shown in a separate map) had 76% urban population, Chanditala I 42%, Chanditala II 69% and Jangipara 7% (census towns shown in the map above). All places marked in the map are linked in the larger full screen map.

=== Gram panchayat ===
Villages and census towns in Bhagabatipur gram panchayat are: Bhadua, Bhagabatipur, Jalamadul, Kanaidanga, Metekhal and Singjor.

== Demographics ==
As per 2011 Census of India Bhagabatipur had a total population of 7,068 of which 3,586 (51%) were males and 3,482 (49%) were females. Population below 6 years was 831. The total number of literates in Bhagabatipur was 5,566 (89.24% of the population over 6 years).

== Economy ==
=== Livelihood ===
Most of the people are goldsmiths and Jewellery makers and rest are dependent on cultivation. And few are service men.

== Politics ==
Kalyan Banerjee of All India Trinamool Congress is the Member of Parliament and Swati Khandekar of All India Trinamool Congress is the Member of Legislative Assembly.

== Transport ==
Transportation is mainly based on public transport like bhagwatipur to Dankuni and small vehicles like magic van. The nearest airport is Netaji Subhas Chandra Bose International Airport and the nearest rail stations are Dakshinbari railway station (Howrah-Amta line). The nearest junction station is Dankuni railway station (Howrah-Bardhaman chord line) which is 13 km approx.

== Education ==
Bhagabatipur Milan Vidyapith is the oldest school in Bhagabatipur. Nearby English Medium School are

●St. Stephen's School

●H.S Memorial School

●Happy Children's School

●Little Anges K.G. School

- S.M Memorial School

Nearby Colleges are:

Vidyasagar Mahavidyalaya

Raja Peary Mohan College

Azad Hind Fouz Smriti Mahavidyalaya

Lalbaba College

Indian Statistical Institute
