= Nababpur =

- Census Town
- Location in West Bengal, India Nababpur (India)
- Coordinates: 22.7072961°N 88.1998099°E
- Country: India
- State: West Bengal
- District: Hooghly
- Nearest City: Serampore

Population (2011)
  - Total: 12,728

Languages
  - Official: Bengali, English
- Time zone: UTC+5:30 (IST)
- Vehicle registration: WB
- Lok Sabha constituency: Serampore
- Vidhan Sabha constituency: Chanditala
- Website: wb.gov.in

Nababpur is a census town in Chanditala I CD Block in Srirampore subdivision of Hooghly district in the state of West Bengal, India.

== Geography ==
Cities and towns in Chanditala I, Chanditala II and Jangipara CD Blocks in Srirampore subdivision in Hooghly district
M: municipal city/ town, CT: census town, R: rural/ urban centre,
Owing to space constraints in the small map, the actual locations in a larger map may vary slightly

=== Location ===
Nawabpur is located at 22.70729°N 88.19980°E.

Gangadharpur, Manirampur, Masat, Jangalpara, Dudhkalmi, Nawabpur, Bhagabatipur, Kumirmora and Ramanathpur form a cluster of census towns in Chanditala I CD Block.

=== Urbanisation ===
Srirampore subdivision is the most urbanized of the subdivisions in Hooghly district. 73.13% of the population in the subdivision is urban and 26.88% is rural. The subdivision has 6 municipalities and 34 census towns. The municipalities are: Uttarpara Kotrung Municipality, Konnagar Municipality, Serampore Municipality, Baidyabati Municipality, Rishra Municipality and Dankuni Municipality. Amongst the CD Blocks in the subdivision, Uttarapara Serampore (census towns shown in a separate map) had 76% urban population, Chanditala I 42%, Chanditala II 69% and Jangipara 7% (census towns shown in the map above). All places marked in the map are linked in the larger full screen map.

=== Gram panchayat ===
Villages and census towns in Nababpur gram panchayat are: Alipur, Dudhkalmi, Nababpur and Pakur.

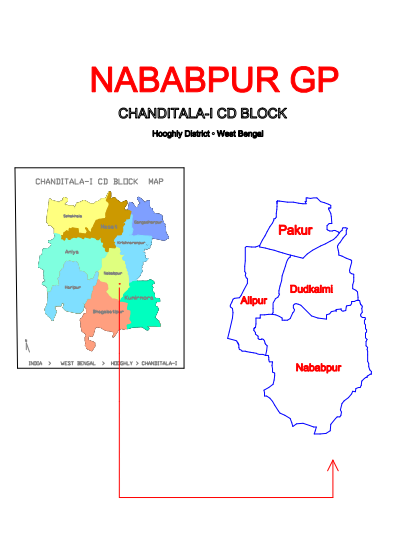
Map of NABABPUR

== Demographics ==
As per 2011 Census of India, Nababpur had a population of 12,728, of which 6,309 (50%) were males and 6,419 (50%) females. Population below 6 years was 1,696. The number of literates in Nababpur was 9,594 (86.97% of the population over 6 years).

== Transport ==
Janai Road railway station on Howrah-Bardhaman chord line is the nearest railway station.
