= Masat, Hooghly =

Masat
- Census Town
- Location in West Bengal, India Masat (India)
- Coordinates: 22.736986°N 88.191802°E
- District: India
- State: West Bengal
- District: Hooghly

Population (2011)
  - Total: 22,007

Languages
  - Official: Bengali, English
- Time zone: UTC+5:30 (IST)
- PIN: 712701
- Vehicle registration: WB
- Lok Sabha constituency: Serampore
- Vidhan Sabha constituency: Chanditala
- Website: Masat

Masat is a census town in Chanditala I CD block in Srirampore subdivision of Hooghly district in the state of West Bengal, India.

== Geography ==
Cities and towns in Chanditala I, Chanditala II and Jangipara CD blocks in Srirampore subdivision in Hooghly district
M: municipal city/ town, CT: census town, R: rural/ urban centre.
Owing to space constraints in the small map, the actual locations in a larger map may vary slightly.

=== Location ===
Masat is located at 22.7369°N 88.1918°E and is a gram panchayat.

Gangadharpur, Manirampur, Masat, Jangalpara, Dudhkalmi, Nababpur, Bhagabatipur, Kumirmora and Ramanathpur form a cluster of census towns in Chanditala I CD block.

=== CD block HQ ===
The headquarters of Chanditala I CD block are located at Masat.

=== Urbanisation ===
Srirampore subdivision is the most urbanized of the subdivisions in Hooghly district. 73.13% of the population in the subdivision is urban and 26.88% is rural. The subdivision has six municipalities and 34 census towns. The municipalities are Uttarpara Kotrung Municipality, Konnagar Municipality, Serampore Municipality, Baidyabati Municipality, Rishra Municipality and Dankuni Municipality. Amongst the CD blocks in the subdivision, Uttarapara Serampore (census towns shown in a separate map) had 76% urban population, Chanditala I 42%, Chanditala II 69% and Jangipara 7% (census towns shown in the map above). All places marked in the map are linked in the larger full screen map.

=== Gram panchayat ===
Villages and census towns in Masat gram panchayat are Aushbati, Azabnagar, Banamalipur, Chhunche, Krishnanagar and Masat.

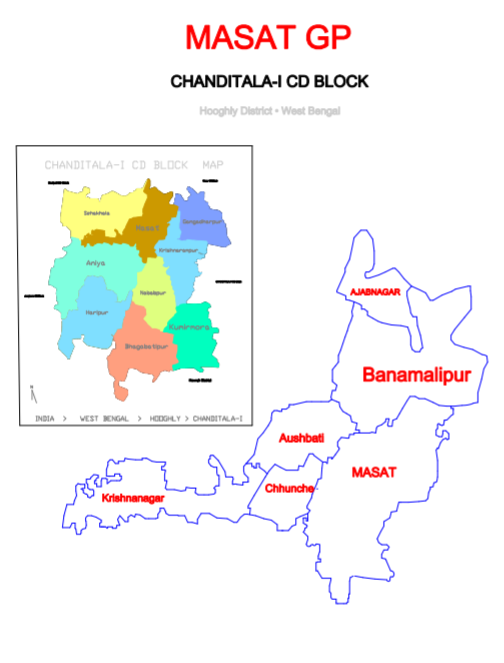
Map of Masat GP

== Demographics ==
As of the 2011 Census of India, Masat had a total population of 15,007, consisting of 9,033 males and 5,974 females. The population of children under 6 years old was 752. The total number of literate people in Masat was 6,286 (86.64% of the population over 6 years of age).

== Transport ==
=== Railway and road ===
Baruipara railway station is the nearest railway station on the Howrah-Bardhaman chord of Kolkata Suburban Railway network. The main road is SH 15 (Ahilyabai Holkar Road). It is the main road of the town and is connected to NH 19 (old number NH 2).

=== Bus ===
==== Private bus ====
- 26 Bonhooghly - Champadanga
- 26A Serampore - Aushbati
- 26C Bonhooghly - Jagatballavpur

==== Bus routes without numbers ====
- Howrah Station - Bandar (Dhanyaghori)

== Education ==
Vidyasagar Mahavidyalaya, established in 1998, is a coeducational undergraduate college in Masat. It offers honours courses in Bengali, English, history, political science, education and commerce.

Masat Aptap Mitra High School is a coeducational higher secondary school at Masat. It has arrangements for teaching Bengali, English, history, philosophy, political science, economics, geography, eco-geography. accountancy, business economics & mathematics, mathematics, physics, chemistry and bio-science.

Kajal Patra Singing School, established in 2002, is a coeducational singing school in Masat Paschimpara Kalitala. It offers all type of musical courses.
