= Srirampore subdivision =

- Subdivision
- Serampore subdivision
- Interactive map of Srirampore subdivision
- Coordinates: 22.75°N 88.34°E
- Country: India
- State: West Bengal
- District: Hooghly
- Headquarters: Serampore

Government
  - Type: Subdivisional headquarter

Area
  - Total: 422.45 km^{2} (163.11 sq mi)

Population
  - Total: 1,469,849
  - Density: 3,479.3/km^{2} (9,011.5/sq mi)

Languages
  - Official: Bengali, English
- Time zone: UTC+5:30 (IST)
- ISO 3166 code: ISO 3166-2:IN
- Vehicle registration: WB 15 / WB 16 / WB 17 / WB 18
- Website: wb.gov.in

Srirampore subdivision is an administrative subdivision of the Hooghly district in the state of West Bengal, India.

== Overview ==
Srirampore subdivision is the most urbanised, with the highest density of population, of all the subdivisions of Hooghly district. Urbanisation started with industrialisation of the Hooghly Flats, the narrow strip of land along the Hooghly and spread inland covering a large portion of Hooghly-Damodar Plain, the agriculturally rich alluvial plains lying between the Hooghly and the Damodar. The entire area is a part of the Gangetic Delta. The Hooghly is a tidal river and has a high west bank. The spread of urbanisation obviously affected the livelihood of the people, with a high proportion of workers being engaged in non-agricultural pursuits.

== Subdivisions ==
The Hooghly district is divided into the following administrative subdivisions:

Subdivision	Headquarters	Area km^{2}	Population (2011)	Rural population % (2011)	Urban population % (2011)
Chinsurah	Hugli-Chuchura	1,148.15	1,657,518	68.63	31.37
Chandannagore	Chandannagar	508.08	1,127,176	58.52	41.48
Srirampore	Serampore	422.45	1,469,849	26.88	73.12
Arambag	Arambag	1,058.87	1,264,602	94.77	5.23
Hooghly district	Chinsurah	3,149.00	5,519,145	61.43	38.57

Cities and towns in Chanditala I, Chanditala II and Jangipara CD blocks in Srirampore subdivision in Hooghly district
M: municipal city/ town, CT: census town, R: rural/ urban centre.
Owing to space constraints in the small map, the actual locations in a larger map may vary slightly.
Cities and towns in the Sreerampur Uttarpara CD Bbock in Srirampore subdivision in Hooghly district
M: municipal city/ town, CT: census town.
Owing to space constraints in the small map, the actual locations in a larger map may vary slightly.

== Administrative units ==
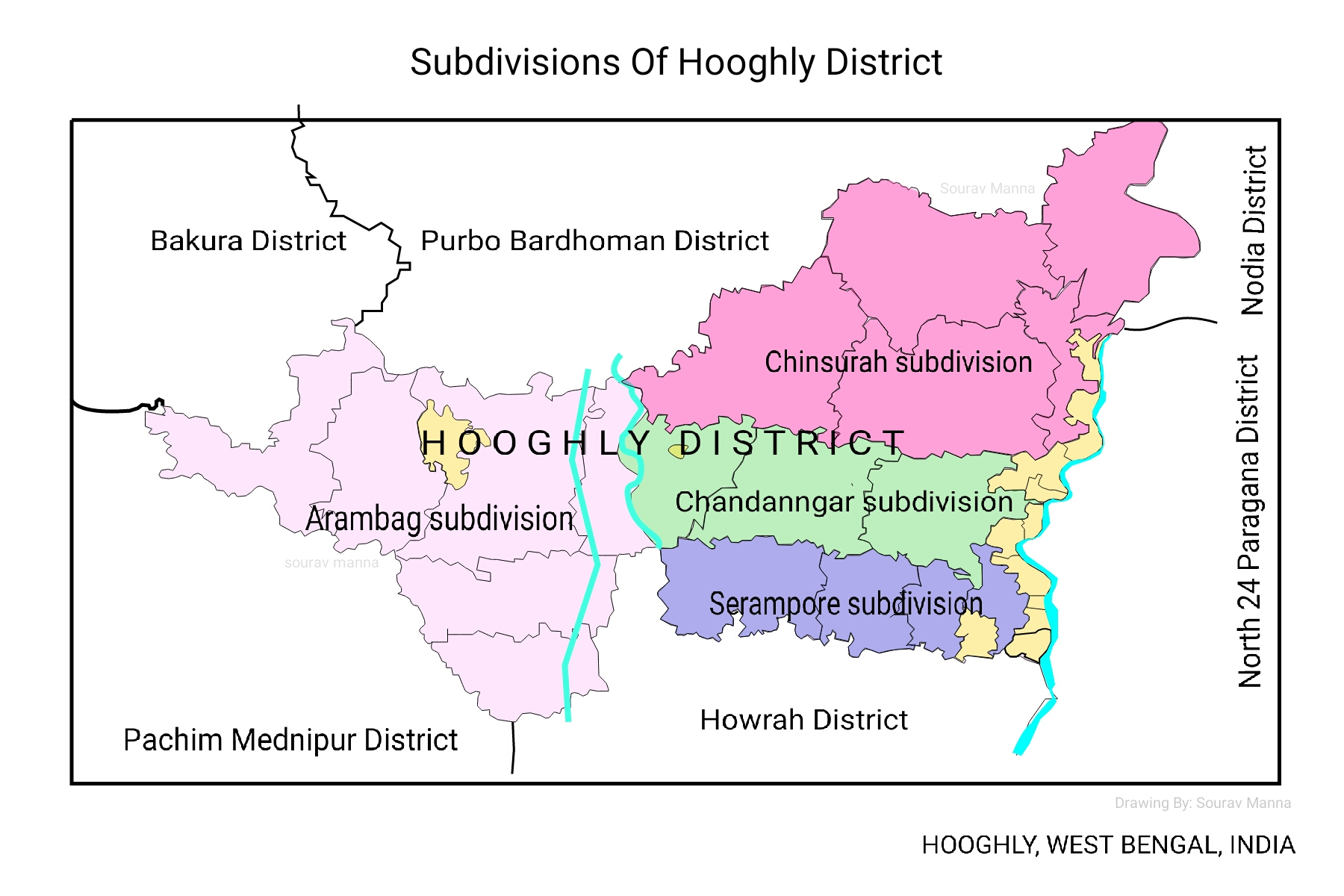

Srirampore subdivision has 7 police stations, 4 community development blocks, 4 panchayat samitis, 34 gram panchayats, 240 mouzas, 208 inhabited villages, 6 municipalities and 34 census towns. The municipalities are Uttarpara-Kotrung, Konnagar, Serampore, Baidyabati, Rishra and Dankuni. The census towns are: Belumilki, Dakshin Rajyadharpur, Rishra, Bamunari, Nawapara, Nabagram Colony, Basai, Kanaipur, Raghunathpur, Masat, Jangalpara, Gangadharpur, Manirampur, Dudhkalmi, Nababpur, Kumirmora, Ramanathpur, Bhagabatipur, Kharsarai, Tisa, Kapashanria, Jaykrishnapur, Purba Tajpur, Begampur, Baksa, Panchghara, Chikrand, Janai, Pairagachha, Naity (Naiti), Barijhati, Garalgachha, Krishnapur and Rajbalhat. The subdivision has its headquarters at Serampore.

== Kolkata Urban Agglomeration ==
The following municipalities and census towns in Srirampur subdivision were part of Kolkata Urban Agglomeration in the 2011 census: Serampore (M), Baidyabati (M), Rishra (M), Konnagar (M), Uttarpara Kotrung (M), Rishra (CT), Bamunari (CT), Dakshin Rajyadharpur (CT), Nabagram Colony (CT), Raghunathpur (PS-Dankuni) (CT) and Kanaipur (CT).

== Police stations ==
Police stations in Srirampore subdivision have the following features and jurisdiction:

Police station	Area covered km^{2}	Municipal town	CD block
Jangipara	n/a	-	Jangipara
Chanditala	n/a	-	Chanditala I, Chanditala II (partly)
Dankuni	n/a	Dankuni	Chanditala II (partly), Sreerampur Uttarpara (partly)
Uttarpara	n/a	Uttarpara-Kotrung, Konnagar	Sreerampur Uttarpara (partly)
Serampore	n/a	Serampore, Baidyabati	Sreerampur Uttarpara (partly)
Serampore Women	n/a	n/a	n/a
Rishra	n/a	Rishra	-

== Blocks ==
Community development blocks in Srirampore subdivision are:

CD block	Headquarters	Area km^{2}	Population (2011)	SC %	ST %	Hindus %	Muslims %	Literacy rate %	Census towns
Sreerampur Uttarpara	Serampore	44.80	152,266	23.04	0.82	90.14	9.10	86.68	9
Chanditala I	Masat	93.45	179,825	19.60	0.16	65.23	34.60	83.76	9
Chanditala II	Chanditala	70.34	158,396	15.21	1.00	81.35	18.41	84.78	15
Jangipara	Jangipara	164.23	221,578	30.87	4.61	76.41	23.15	79.62	1

=== Map of Srirampore subdivision ===
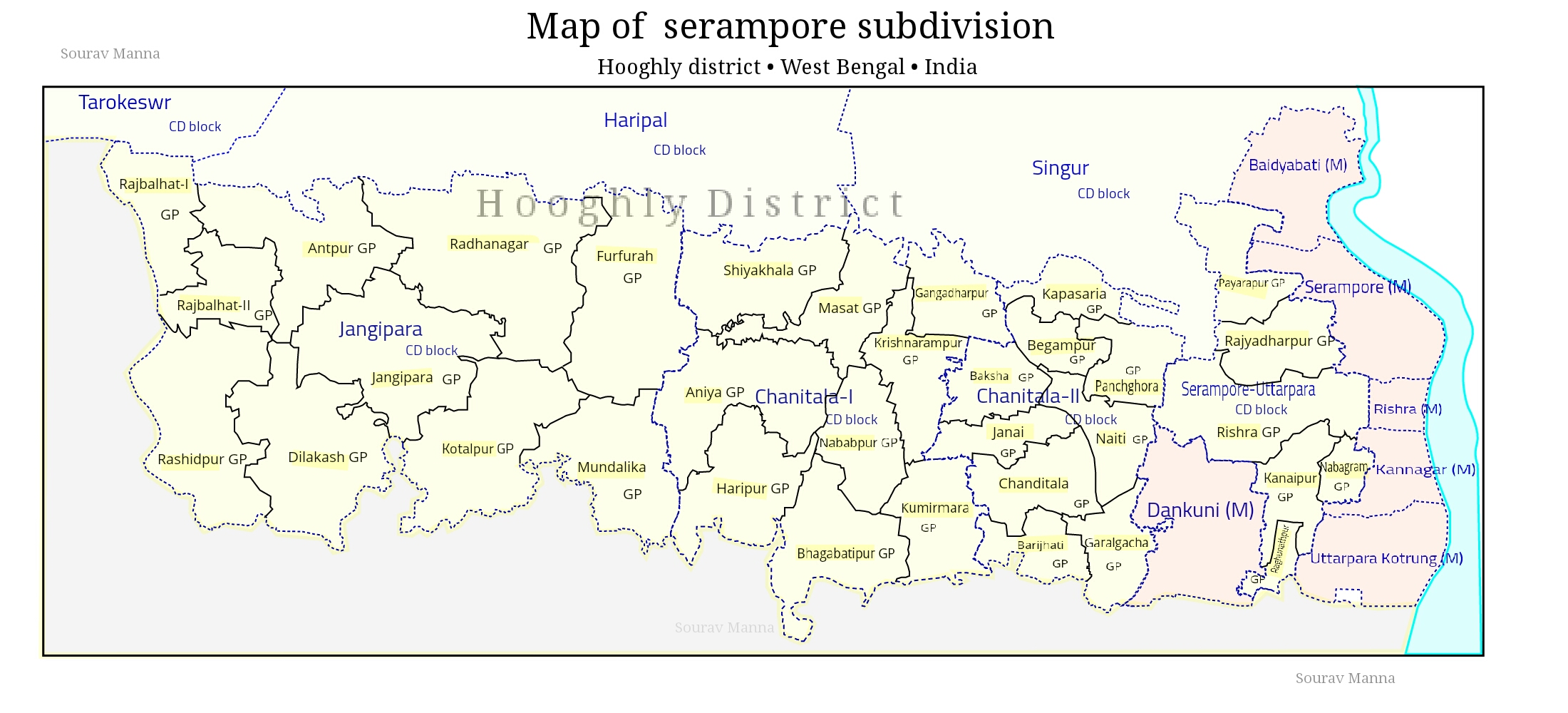

=== Block map ===
Jangipara CD block

Chanditala-I CD block

Chanditala-II CD block

Sreerampur Uttarpara CD block

== Economy ==
=== Industry ===
The first jute mill in India was set up at Rishra in 1855. Hastings Jute Mill, established in 1875, in what was the country retreat of Warren Hastings, on the banks of the Hooghly at Rishra is owned by Sanjay Kajaria, MD of Murlidhar Ratanlal Exports. Another jute mill at Rishra, the Wellington Jute Mill, stopped operations in 2016. India Jute Mill at Serampore, established in 1866, also stopped working from 2015.

There are several large and varied industrial units in Srirampore subdivision:

- The manufacturing activities of ICI India Limited commenced in 1939 with the setting up of Alkali and Chemical Corporation of India at Rishra. The plant manufactures paints and special chemicals. AkzoNobel, a Dutch multinational, acquired the parent company in UK, Imperial Chemical Industries, in 2008.
- Hindustan National Glass & Industries Ltd., was founded by C.K.Somany in 1946, with the commissioning of India's first fully automated glass manufacturing plant, at Rishra. It is a key player in India's container glass industry.
- Jaya Shree Textiles Limited, a unit of Aditya Birla Nuvo Ltd. was established at Rishra in 1949. It is a leading player in the linen and wool segment and a major exporter.
- Kusum Products Ltd. manufactures vanaspati, soap and detergents at Rishra.
- Aditya Birla Insulators, the largest Indian manufacturers of high voltage porcelain insulators, has one its two plants at PO Prabhas Nagar, Rishra. It caters to the entire spectrum of substation and transmission insulators. It exports to over 58 countries.
- Berger Paints India Ltd., the second largest paint company in India, has its headquarters at Kolkata and 10 manufacturing units spread across the country. It has a water based paint plant at Rishra.
- PMC Rubber Chemicals India Private Ltd. is a global developer and manufacturer of performance chemicals and plastics. They started in 1994 and have their plant at Rishra.
- The Phosphate Company Limited, which manufactures and markets the super phosphate fertiliser under the Lakshmi brand, started production at Rishra in 1950. It is one of the leading brands in the market.
- United Spirits produces fast moving brands of Indian-made foreign liquor at Bhadrakali.
- Bhusan Industries Ltd. has set up a 1.5 lakh tons cold rolling mills complex near Rishra. It started production in 2000.
- Hooghly Alloy & Steels Co. Pvt. Ltd. was established in 1985 and have a 60,000 tonnes per annum rolling mills at Dakshin Rajyadharpur.
- Shalimar Wires Industry Limited was initially set up in 1961 at Uttarpara to provide import substitution support for the Indian paper industry. In the eighties it diversified into import substitution items for the tool room industry and synthetic forming fabric.
- Madura Coats Pvt. Ltd. established a factory at Battala, Serampore in 1889 to produce cotton and blended yarns and industrial products.
- Bhusan Power and Steel started with a cold rolling and galvanising plants in 2001 at Bangihati, Mallickpara, Dankuni and have subsequently expanded.
- Dankuni Coal Complex, operated by South Eastern Coalfields, at Dankuni, produces 1,000 MT per day of solid smokeless fuel branded as CILCOKE, 18 million cft per day of coalgas for supply in and around Kolkata and Howrah, tar chemicals etc.
- Diesel Locomotive Component Factory of the Indian Railways was inaugurated by Mamata Banerjee at Dankuni in 2012. It produces high horse power diesel locomotive underframes etc. It functions as a sister unit of Banaras Locomotive Works at Varanasi.
- Electric Loco Assembly and Ancillary Unit of Chittaranjan Locomotive Works of Indian Railways at Dankuni has started functioning in 2016.

The entire area has a large number of medium and small industries.

Hindustan Motors started operations at Hindmotor, a neighbourhood in Uttarpara Kotrung Municipality in 1948. The Ambassador was the best known amongst its models. It declared suspension of work at its Uttarpara plant on 24 May 2014.

The jute industry, once the pioneer in industrialising this state, has been in a bad shape, but it is not the jute industry alone that is in a bad shape. In the Srirampore subdivision, there are other units such as J.K.Steel and Bangalaxmi Cotton Mills, which have not been doing well or have closed down, although many other industries are doing well.

Srirampore subdivision has a large migrant presence in the workforce. They have come from Bihar, Uttar Pradesh, Orissa and Andhra Pradesh. They have settled in the slums around or near their work place and many of the locality names reflect their origins – Chhapra basti, Gayapar basti, Odiya basti and Telengipara.

=== Handloom weaving ===
The handloom sarees of Dhaniakhali, Begampur, Jangipara, Rajbalhat areas and dhutis of Haripal, Rajbalhat, Khanakul areas of Hooghly district are widely familiar.

=== Agriculture ===
Hooghly is an agriculturally prosperous district of West Bengal. Although the economy has been shifting away from agriculture, it is still the pre-dominant economic activity and the main source of livelihood for the rural people of the district. One third of the district income comes from agriculture. Given below is an overview of the agricultural production (all data in tonnes) for Srirampore subdivision, other subdivisions and the Hooghly district, with data for the year 2013-14.

CD block/ subdivision	Rice	Wheat	Jute	Pulses	Oil seeds	Potatoes	Sugarcane
Jangipara	109,389	-	30,806	-	4,421	342,597	305
Chanditala I	10,600	-	4,282	7	261	51,925	-
Chanditala II	5,721	-	3,637	2	1,828	39,004	-
Sreerampur Uttarpara	1,142	11	1,095	3	1,548	2,585	2,132
Srirampore subdivision	126,852	11	39,820	12	8,058	436,111	2,437
Chinsurah subdivision	235,561	92	111,218	4	10,362	812,808	162
Chandannagore subdivision	189,791	12	136,276	-	6,522	313,692	-
Arambag subdivision	255,011	75	134,541	30	19,477	514,903	123,934
Hooghly district	807,215	190	421,855	46	44,419	2,077,514	126,533

=== Poverty ===
The information given above leads us on to a comment in the District Human Development Report for Hooghly district: In the sub-division wise comparison of the levels of poverty in Hooghly district, Srirampur and Chandannagore share the lowest incidence of poverty.

== Education ==
Hooghly district had a literacy rate of 81.80% as per the provisional figures of the census of India 2011. Chinsurah subdivision had a literacy rate of 79.17%, Chandannagore subdivision 83.01%, Srirampore subdivision 86.13% and Arambag subdivision 79.05.

Given in the table below (data in numbers) is a comprehensive picture of the education scenario in Hooghly district for the year 2013-14:

Subdivision	Primary school		Middle school		High school		Higher secondary school		General college, univ.		Technical / professional inst.		Non-formal education	
Subdivision	Institution	Students	Institution	Students	Institution	Students	Institution	Students	Institution	Students	Institution	Students	Institution	Students
Chinsurah	899	85,213	46	3,885	98	48,722	109	124,068	7	16,342	26	10,564	2,413	45,289
Chandannagore	606	53,382	32	3,312	46	22,000	77	89,132	6	20,450	6	778	1,297	29,127
Srirampore	577	64,207	25	3,611	65	37,997	97	108,199	8	16,631	3	793	1,337	33,060
Arambag	935	80,705	49	5,462	83	48,513	76	91,911	7	16,950	3	228	1,838	57,383
Hooghly district	3,013	283,407	152	16,270	292	157,232	359	413,310	28	70,373	38	12,363	6,885	164,859

Note: Primary schools include junior basic schools; middle schools, high schools and higher secondary schools include madrasahs; technical schools include junior technical schools, junior government polytechnics, industrial technical institutes, industrial training centres, nursing training institutes etc.; technical and professional colleges include engineering colleges, medical colleges, para-medical institutes, management colleges, teachers training and nursing training colleges, law colleges, art colleges, music colleges etc. Special and non-formal education centres include sishu siksha kendras, madhyamik siksha kendras, centres of Rabindra mukta vidyalaya, recognised Sanskrit tols, institutions for the blind and other handicapped persons, Anganwadi centres, reformatory schools etc.

The following institutions are located in Srirampore subdivision:

- Serampore College, a general degree college, was established in 1818 by William Carey, Joshua Marshman and William Ward at Serampore, which was a Danish colony from 1755 to 1845.
- Pearl Rosary School, affiliated to WBBSE, WBCHSE, was established at Serampore in 2005. The school is authorised study centre of National Institute of Open Schooling ( NIOS), Govt of India.
- Raja Peary Mohan College, a general degree college, was established at Uttarpara in 1887.
- Serampore Girls' College, a general degree college for girls, was established at Serampore in 1981.
- Government College of Engineering & Textile Technology Serampore, an engineering college, was established in 1908 as Government Central Weaving Institute. It started offering a degree course in textile technology in 1957. It started offering B. Tech. in 1998, and added general engineering subjects. It started offering M.Tech. courses from 1994.
- Nabagram Hiralal Paul College, a general degree college, was established in 1957, at Nabagram, Konnagar.
- Bidhan Chandra College, Rishra, a general degree college, was established at Rishra in 1957.
- Mahitosh Nandy Mahavidyalaya, a general degree college, was established at Jangipara, in 2007.
- Vidyasagar Mahavidyalaya, a general degree college, was established at Suchia, Masat in 1998.
- Swami Niswambalananda Girls' College, a general degree college for girls, was established at Bhadrakali in 1978.

== Healthcare ==
The table below (all data in numbers) presents an overview of the medical facilities available and patients treated in the hospitals, health centres and sub-centres in 2014 in Hooghly district.

Subdivision	Health & Family Welfare Dept., WB				Other state govt depts.	Local bodies	Central govt depts. / PSUs	NGO / private nursing homes	Total	Total number of beds	Total number of doctors*	Indoor patients	Outdoor patients
Subdivision	Hospitals	Rural Hospitals	Block Primary Health Centres	Primary Health Centres	Other state govt depts.	Local bodies	Central govt depts. / PSUs	NGO / private nursing homes	Total	Total number of beds	Total number of doctors*	Indoor patients	Outdoor patients
Chinsurah	1	2	3	24	-	-	-	31	61	1,091	108	94,213	1,830,358
Chandannagore	1	3	-	8	-	-	-	41	53	828	56	70,724	1,105,060
Srirampore	3	2	2	12	-	-	-	80	99	1,894	85	63,619	1,252,941
Arambag	1	1	5	16	-	-	-	35	58	919	57	83,469	1,743,719
Hooghly district	6	8	10	60	-	-	-	187	271	4,732	306	312,025	5,932,078

* Excluding nursing homes

Medical facilities in Srirampore subdivision are as follows:

Hospitals (name, location, beds):
Serampore Walsh Super Speciality Subdivisional Hospital, Serampore Municipality, 266 beds
Serampore TB Hospital, Serampore Municipality, 55 beds
Serampore ESI Hospital, Serampore Municipality, 216 beds
Uttarpara General Hospital, Uttarpara Kotrung Municipality, 204 beds
Female Vagrants Home, Uttarpara Kotrung Municipality.
Konnagar Matri Sadan O Sishu Mangal Pratisthan, Konnagar Municipality, 43 beds
Rishra Municipal Seva Sadan, Rishra Municipality, 150 beds

Rural hospitals (name, block, location, beds):
Jangipara Rural Hospital, Jangipara CD block, Jangipara, 60 beds
Akuni Ichhapasar Rural Hospital, Chanditala I CD block, Aniya, 30 beds
Chanditala Rural Hospital, Chanditala II CD block, Chanditala, 30 beds
Kanaipur Rural Hospital, Sreerampur Uttarpara CD block, Kanaipur, 30 beds

Primary health centres (CD block-wise) (CD block, PHC location, beds):
Jangipara CD block: Mundalika (10 beds), Furfura (10 beds), Guti (4 beds), Rajbalhat (6 beds).
Chanditala I CD block: Bhattapur, Akuni (4 beds), Gangadharpur (10 beds), Jangalpara (6 beds)
Chanditala II CD block:Begampur (4 beds), Janai Baksa, Janai (10 beds)
Sreerampur Uttarpara CD block: Rajyadharpur (10 beds)
Uttarpara Kotrung Municipality: Bhadrakali (5 beds)

Private hospitals* (name, location, beds):
Paramount Health Care, 148 & 151, G.T Road, Maniktala, Serampore, 30 beds
Disha Eye Hospital, Sheoraphuli, 25 beds
Kamala Ray Hospital Pvt. Ltd., Kotrung GT Road, PO Hindmotor, 50 beds

* Excluding nursing homes

== Electoral constituencies ==
Lok Sabha (parliamentary) and Vidhan Sabha (state assembly) constituencies in Srirampore subdivision were as follows:

Lok Sabha constituency	Reservation	Vidhan Sabha constituency	Reservation	CD block and/or gram panchayats and/or municipal areas
Srerampur	None	Uttarpara	None	Uttarpara-Kotrang municipality, Konnagar municipality, Nabagram, Kanaipur and Raghunathpur gram panchayats of Sreerampur Uttarpara community development block
-	-	Sreerampur	None	Ward Nos. 3 to 19 and 25 of Serampore municipality, Rishra municipality, Rajyadharpur and Rishra gram panchayats of Sreerampur Uttarpara CD block
-	-	Champdani	None	Champdani municipality, Baidyabati municipality, Ward Nos. 1 & 2 and 20 to 24 of Serampore municipality and Payarapur GP of Sreerampur Uttarpara CD block
-	-	Chanditala	None	Bhagabatipur, Gangadharpur, Krishnarampur, Kumirmora and Nababpur GPs of Chanditala I CD block and Baksa, Barijhati, Chanditala, Dankuni, Garalgachha, Janai, Monoharpur, Mrigala and Naiti GPs of Chanditala II CD block
-	-	Jangipara	None	Jangipara CD block and Aniya, Haripur, Masat and Sehakhala GPs of Chanditala I CD block
-	-	Other two assembly segments are in Howrah district	-	-
