= Bhadrakali, Hooghly =

Bhadrakali
- Neighbourhood
- Location in West Bengal, India Bhadrakali (West Bengal) Bhadrakali (India)
- Coordinates: 22°40′34″N 88°20′48″E
- Country: India
- State: West Bengal
- Division: Burdwan
- District: Hooghly

Government
  - Type: Municipality
  - Body: Uttarpara Kotrung Municipality

Languages
  - Official: Bengali, English
- Time zone: UTC+5:30 (IST)
- PIN: 712232
- Telephone code: +91 33
- Vehicle registration: WB
- Lok Sabha constituency: Sreerampur
- Vidhan Sabha constituency: Uttarpara
- Website: hooghly.gov.in

Bhadrakali is a neighbourhood in Uttarpara of Hooghly district in the Indian state of West Bengal. It is a part of the area covered by Kolkata Metropolitan Development Authority (KMDA).

== Geography ==
Bhadrakali is located on the west bank of the Hooghly River.

== Education ==
- Swami Niswambalananda Girls' College
- Bhadrakali High School .

== Healthcare ==
There is a primary health centre with 5 beds at Bhadrakali, run by Uttarpara Kotrung Municipality.

== Industry ==
The Bhadrakali distillery of United Spirits was earlier owned by Shaw Wallace. In 1959 Bengal Distillery at Bhadrakali had become a fully owned subsidiary of Shaw Wallace. The Bhadrakali distillery was set up in 1949 and manufactures fast moving brands of Indian-made foreign liquor.

== Transport ==
State Highway 6 (West Bengal) / Grand Trunk Road passes through Bhadrakali. The town is well connected with Howrah–Bardhaman main line through Uttarpara and Hindmotor railway stations.
