= Jagatballavpur =

- Census Town
- Roadway Junction, Sitapur, Jagatballavpur

- Location in West Bengal, India Jagatballavpur (India)
- Coordinates: 22°41′11″N 88°6′25″E
- Country: India
- State: West Bengal
- District: Howrah

Population (2011)
  - Total: 7,113

Languages
  - Official: Bengali, English
- Time zone: UTC+5:30 (IST)
- Postal Code: 711408
- Vehicle registration: WB
- Website: howrah.gov.in

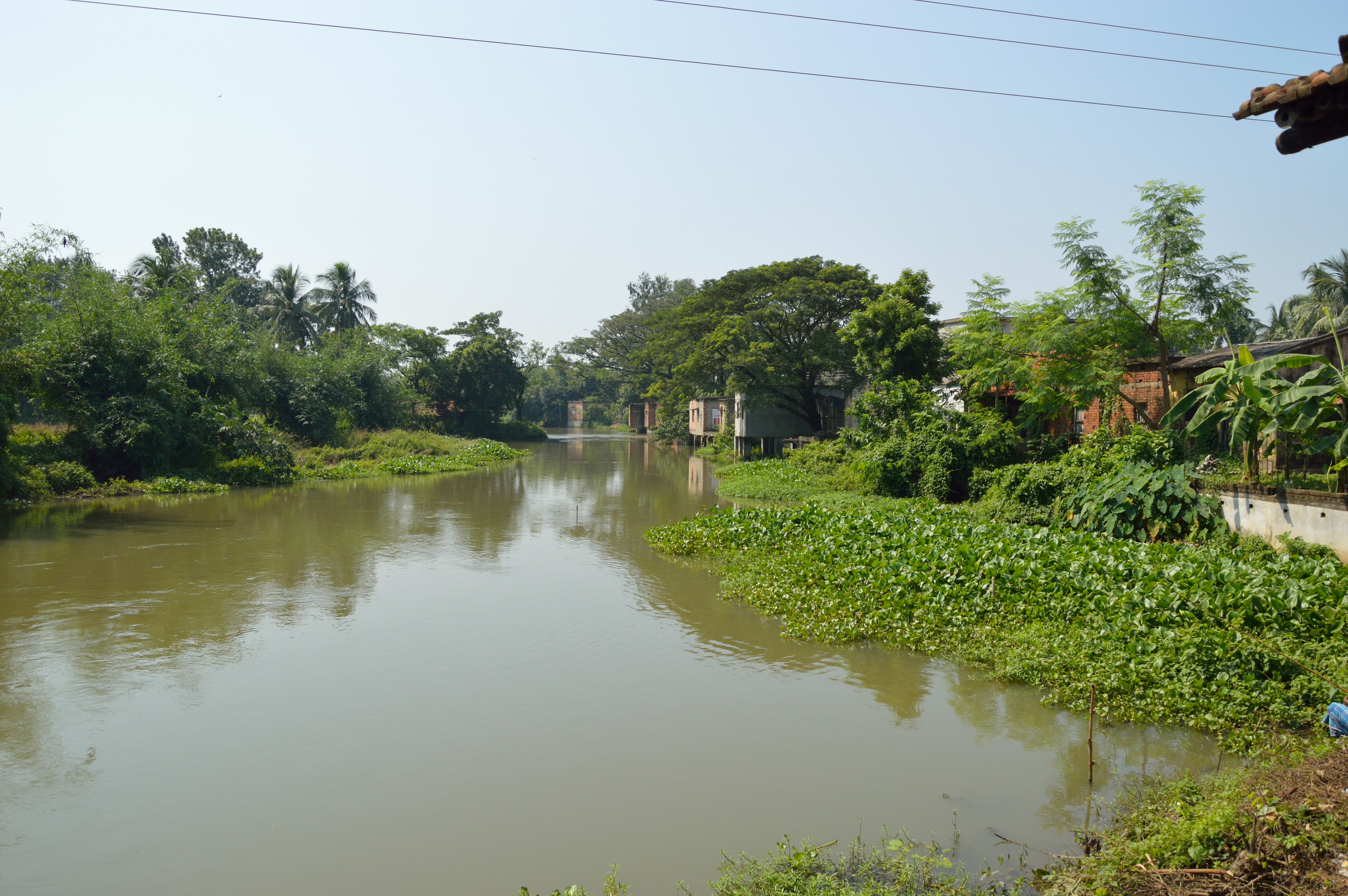
River Kaushiki (Kana-Damodar), Jagatballavpur, Howrah

Jagatballavpur is a census town in Jagatballavpur CD Block in Howrah Sadar subdivision of Howrah district in the Indian state of West Bengal.

== Geography ==
Jagatballavpur is located at 22°41′11″N 88°6′25″E.

== Demographics ==
As per 2011 Census of India Jagatballavpur had a total population of 7,113 of which 3,636 (51%) were males and 3,477 (49%) were females. Population below 6 years was 786. The total number of literates in Jagatballavpur was 5,240 (82.82% of the population over 6 years).

== Transport ==
Jagatballavpur is a junction of five roads which lead to Bargachia, Munsirhat, Masat, Jangipara and Udaynarayanpur.

=== Bus ===
==== Government bus ====
- E13 Esplanade - Jangipara
- E32 Kolkata - Antpur
- E71 Esplanade - Udaynarayanpur
- E72 Esplanade - Jangipara
- E77 Esplanade- Sukanta park
- SBSTC Kolkata - Rajbalhat

==== Private bus ====
- 26C Jagatballavpur - Bonhooghly

==== Bus Route without number ====
- Udaynarayanpur - Howrah Station
- Rajbalhat - Howrah Station
- Tarakeswar - Howrah Station

==== Train ====
Bargachia railway station and Pantihal railway station on Howrah-Amta line are the nearest railway station of Jagatballavpur.

=== Local Transportation ===
The local transportation of Jagatballavpur is also properly maintained by Tracker and also many routes of autos.
