= Uttarpara Kotrung Municipality =

Municipal body in Hooghly district, West Bengal, India

Type
- Type: Municipality

History
- Founded: 1853; 172 years ago

Leadership
- Chairman: Dilip Yadav, AITC
- Vice Chairman: Khokan Mandal, AITC

Structure
- Seats: 24
- Political groups: Government (19): AITC (19); Opposition (4): CPI(M) (3); INC (1); Other (1): IND (1)

Elections
- Last election: 2022
- Next election: 2027

Website
- www.uttarparamunicipality.in

Uttarpara Kotrung Municipality is the civic body that governs Uttarpara Kotrung and its surrounding areas (Bhadrakali and Hind Motor) in Srirampore subdivision of Hooghly district, West Bengal, India. It is the oldest municipality in the state of West Bengal.

== History ==
Uttarpara Municipality was founded on 14 April 1853 after the second appeal by zamindar Joykrishna and others for a municipality to the Government of Bengal, the first appeal made by them in 1851 was rejected. Uttarpara was only the second town in Bengal to voluntarily adopt the Municipal Act of 1850 Sec XX16 – Serampore was the first town to adopt it. However, while in Serampore European residents pushed the issue through, in Uttarpara it was the zamindar Joy Krishna Mukherjee who played the pivotal role and made Uttarpara Municipality the first in the state by establishing it in 1853, 12 years before Serampore Municipality and 23 years before Kolkata Municipal Corporation. Kotrung was merged with Uttarapara Municipality in 1964 and it was renamed Uttarpara Kotrung Municipality. Makhla was merged with Uttarpara Kotrung Municipality in 1991.

== Geography ==
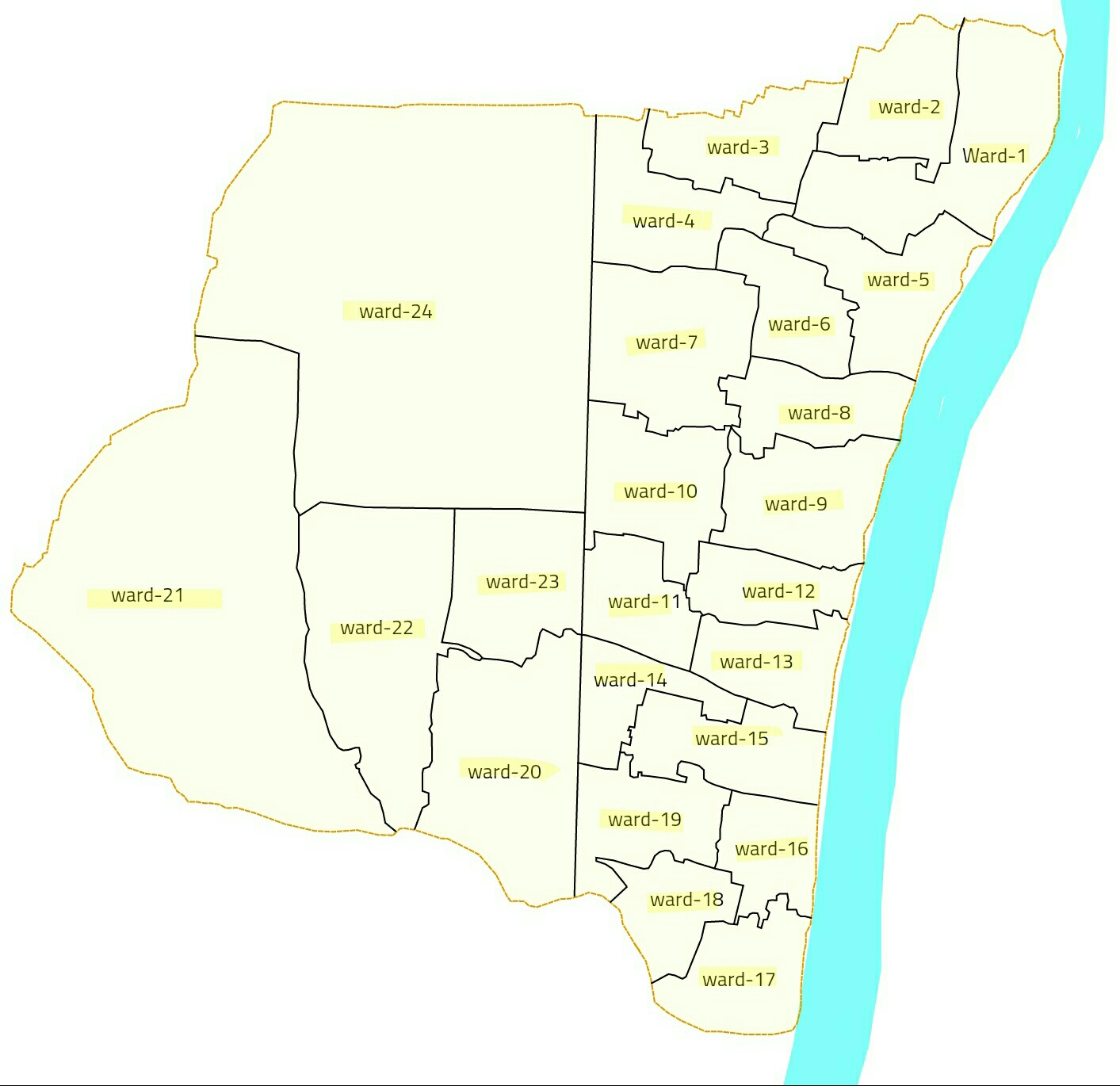
Map of Uttarpara Kotrung Municipality

The boundaries of Uttarpara Kotrung Municipality are as follows: Konnagar Municipality to the north, Hooghly River to the east and Bally Khal to the south. Earlier the railway track was the western limit, but subsequently areas such as Makhla and Hindmotor have been added beyond the railway track.

Uttarpara Kotrung Municipality covers an area of 11.75 sq km and has a population of 159,413 (2011).

In 1981, 27.47% of the total population formed main workers and 72.53% were non-workers in Uttarpara Kotrung Municipality and 37.98% of the total main workers were industrial workers. This may be interpreted as follows: although industrial activities are prominent in the municipal areas of the region, the major portion of the population is commuters and migrants find employment in the area.

== Healthcare ==
Uttarpara General Hospital, with 204 beds, Female Vagrants Home and primary health centre with 5 beds at Bhadrakali are located in the Uttarpara Kotrung Municipality area.

== Elections ==
In the 2015 municipal elections for Uttarpara Kotrung municipality Trinamool Congress won 15 seats, CPI(M) 4 seats, Congress 2 seats and Independents 3 seats.

In the 2010 municipal elections for Uttarpara Kotrung Municipality Trinamool Congress won 22 seats, CPI (M) 1 seat and Independent 1 seat.

== Wards ==
Details of the wards, with 2022 municipal election results, are as follows:

Ward No	Neighbourhood^{1}	Total Electors	Seat Type	Councillor	Party
1	Kotrung	3,883	General	Partha Mazumder	Trinamool Congress
2	Kotrung	6,217	General	Sandip Kumar Das	Trinamool Congress
3	Kotrung	5,651	Woman	Arati Biswas	CPI (M)
4	Kotrung	5,563	General	Prabir Kangsabanik (Sanu)	CPI (M)
5	Kotrung	4,037	General	Pinaki Dhamali	Independent
6	Kotrung	5,182	Woman	Putul Rani Ghosh	Trinamool Congress
7	Kotrung/Bhadrakali	12,019	General	Ajay Singh	Trinamool Congress
8	Bhadrakali	4,305	General	Tapash Mukherjee (Buro)	Trinamool Congress
9	Bhadrakali	5,275	Woman	Mitali Bej	Trinamool Congress
10	Bhadrakali	7,056	Woman SC	Sarathi Golder	Trinamool Congress
11	Bhadrakali	5,170	General	Amitava Mukherjee	Trinamool Congress
12	Bhadrakali	4,228	General	Dilip Yadav	Trinamool Congress
13	Bhadrakali	5,310	Woman	Mousumi Biswas	Trinamool Congress
14	Uttarpara	4,358	General	Utpaladitya Banerjee (Pintu)	Trinamool Congress
15	Uttarpara	5,339	Woman	Susmita Sarkar (Boni)	CPI (M)
16	Uttarpara	4,173	Woman	Dolly Ghosh Yadav	Trinamool Congress
17	Uttarpara	5,782	General	Subrata Mukherjee	Trinamool Congress
18	Uttarpara	3,850	General	Sumit Chakraborty (Tukai)	Trinamool Congress
19	Uttarpara	5,767	Woman	Aditi Kundu	Trinamool Congress
20	Makhla	5,682	General	Indrajit Ghosh (Paba)	Trinamool Congress
21	Makhla	8,858	General	Khokan Mandal	Trinamool Congress
22	Makhla	7,475	Woman	Manashi Singha	Trinamool Congress
23	Makhla	7,230	General	Arnab Roy(Raja)	Trinamool Congress
24	Hindmotor	1,369	General	Kamakhaya Narayan Singh	Congress

This is a broad indication of the neighbourhood covered, not a full description.
