= Ichhapasar =

- Village
- Location in West Bengal, India Ichhapasar (India)
- Coordinates: 22.6988641°N 88.151995°E
- Country: India
- State: West Bengal
- District: Hooghly

Government
  - Body: Gram panchayat

Population (2011)
  - Total: 1,442

Languages
  - Official: Bengali, English
- Time zone: UTC+5:30 (IST)
- PIN: 712701
- ISO 3166 code: IN-WB
- Vehicle registration: WB
- Lok Sabha constituency: Serampore
- Vidhan Sabha constituency: Chanditala
- Website: wb.gov.in

Ichhapasar is a village in Chanditala I community development block of Srirampore subdivision in Hooghly district in the Indian state of West Bengal.

== Geography ==
Ichhapasar is located at 22.6988641°N 88.151995°E.

=== Gram panchayat ===
Villages in Haripur gram panchayat are: Anantarampur, Bade Sola, Baghati, Ban Panchbere, Chak Bangla, Chota Choughara, Dudhkomra, Haripur, Ichhapasar, Jagmohanpur, Mamudpur and Radhaballabhpur.

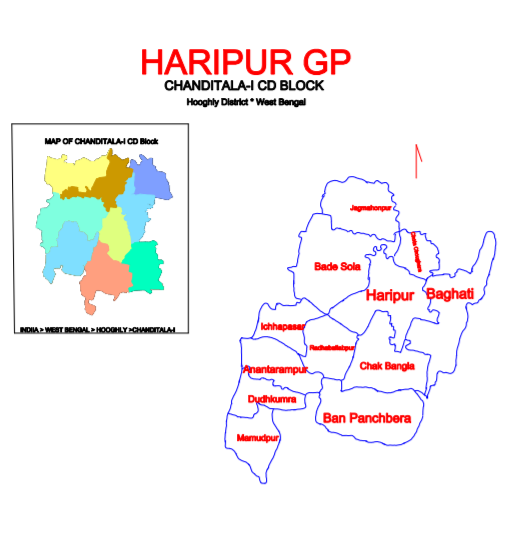
Map of Haripur GP

Map of Chanditala-I CD block sowing GP

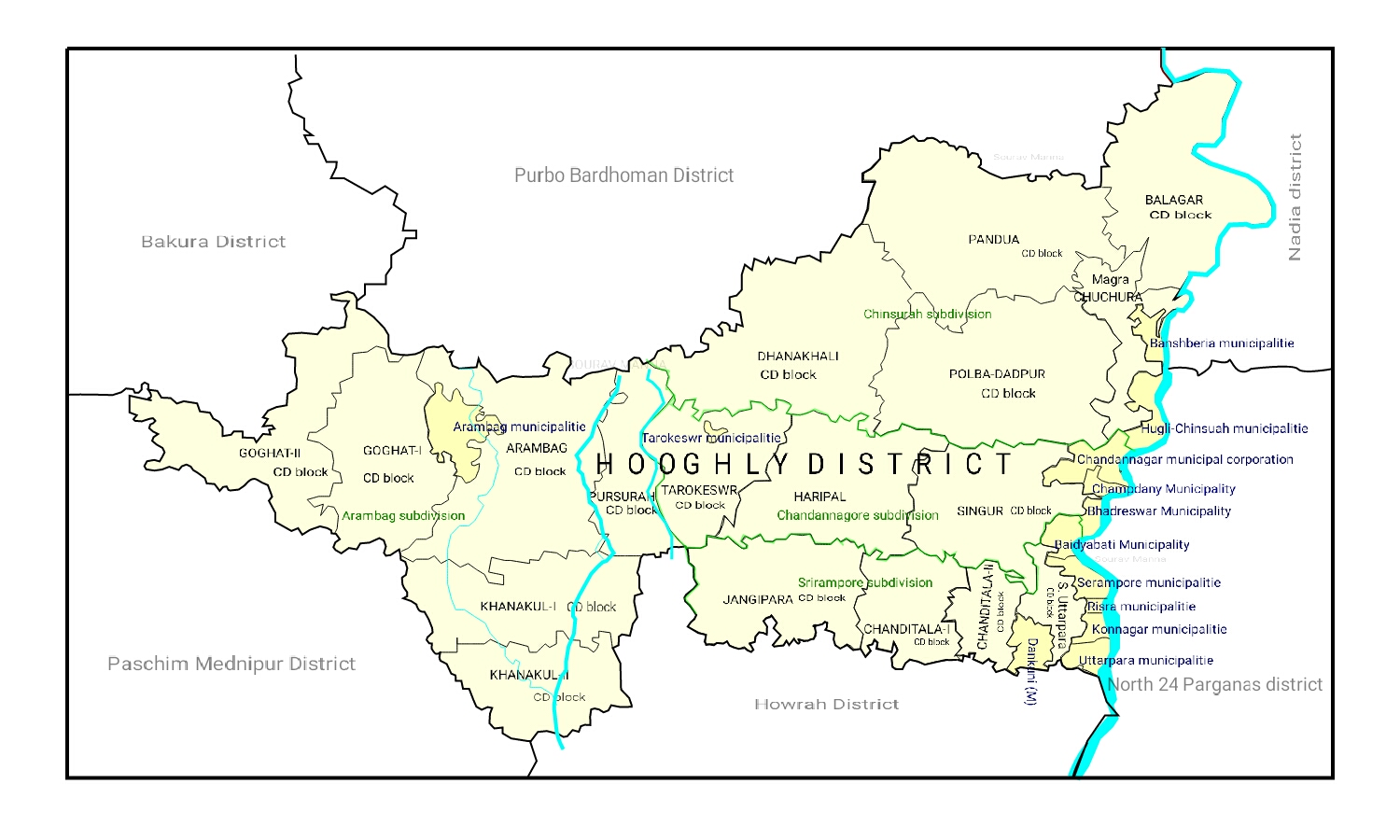
Map of Hooghly district showing CD blocks and municipal areas

== Demographics ==
As per 2011 Census of India, Ichhapasar had a population of 1,442 of which 722 (50%) were males and 720 (50%) were females. Population below 6 years was 141. The number of literates in Ichhapasar was 1,059 (81.40% of the population over 6 years).

== Healthcare ==
Akuni Ichhapasar Rural Hospital at Aniya functions with 30 beds.

== Transport ==
Bargachia railway station and Baruipara railway station are the nearest railway stations.
