= Kalyanbati =

- Village
- Location in West Bengal, India Kalyanbati (India)
- Coordinates: 22.7334801°N 88.15311°E
- Country: India
- State: West Bengal
- District: Hooghly

Government
  - Type: Panchayati raj (India)
  - Body: Gram panchayat

Population (2011)
  - Total: 1,217

Languages
  - Official: Bengali, English
- Time zone: UTC+5:30 (IST)
- ISO 3166 code: IN-WB
- Vehicle registration: WB
- Lok Sabha constituency: Serampore
- Vidhan Sabha constituency: Chanditala
- Website: wb.gov.in

Kalyanbati is a village in Chanditala I community development block of Srirampore subdivision in Hooghly district in the Indian state of West Bengal.

== Geography ==
Kalyanbati is located at: 22°44′01″N 88°09′11″E

=== Gram panchayat ===
Villages in Ainya gram panchayat are: Akuni, Aniya, Bandpur, Banipur, Bara Choughara, Dudhkanra, Ganeshpur, Goplapur, Jiara, Kalyanbati, Mukundapur, Sadpur and Shyamsundarpur.

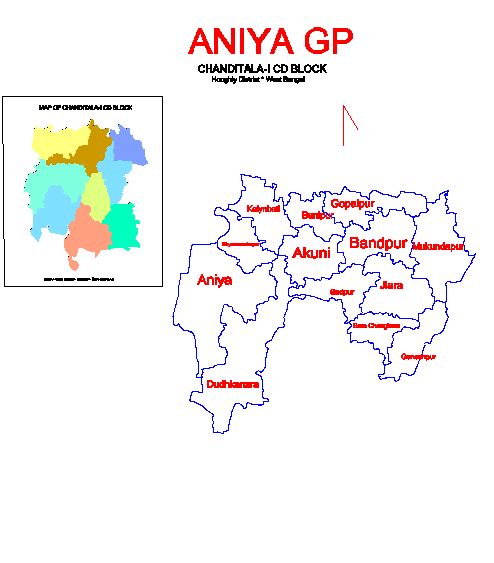
Map of Aniya GP

== Demographics ==
As per 2011 Census of India Kalyanbati had a population of 1,217 of which 641 (53%) were males and 576 (47%) females. Population below 6 years was 138. The number of literates in Kalyanbati was 906 (83.97% of the population over 6 years).

== Transport ==
Bargachia railway station and Baruipara railway station are the nearest railway stations.
