= Gopalpur, Chanditala-I =

Gopalpur
- Village
- Location in West Bengal, India Gopalpur (India)
- Coordinates: 22.7389874°N 88.171955°E
- Country: India
- State: West Bengal
- District: Hooghly

Government
  - Body: Gram panchayat

Population (2011)
  - Total: 901

Languages
  - Official: Bengali, English
- Time zone: UTC+5:30 (IST)
- ISO 3166 code: IN-WB
- Vehicle registration: WB
- Lok Sabha constituency: Serampore
- Vidhan Sabha constituency: Chanditala
- Website: wb.gov.in

Gopalpur is a village in Chanditala I community development block of Srirampore subdivision in Hooghly district in the Indian state of West Bengal.

== Geography ==
Gopalpur is located at 22.7389874°N 88.171955°E.

=== Gram panchayat ===
Villages in Ainya gram panchayat are: Akuni, Aniya, Bandpur, Banipur, Bara Choughara, Dudhkanra, Ganeshpur, Gopalpur, Jiara, Kalyanbati, Mukundapur, Sadpur and Shyamsundarpur.

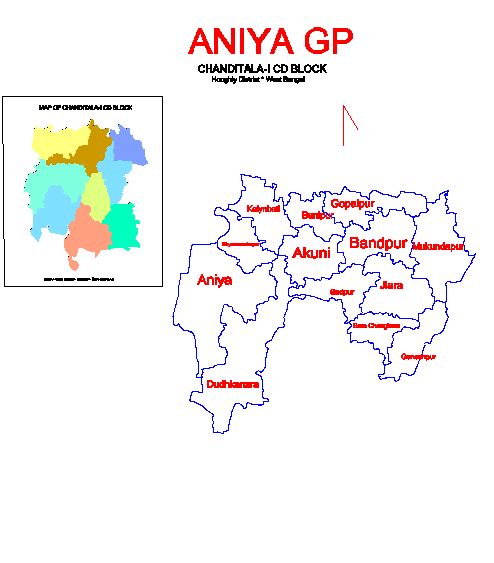
Map of Aniya GP

Map of Chanditala-I CD block sowing GP

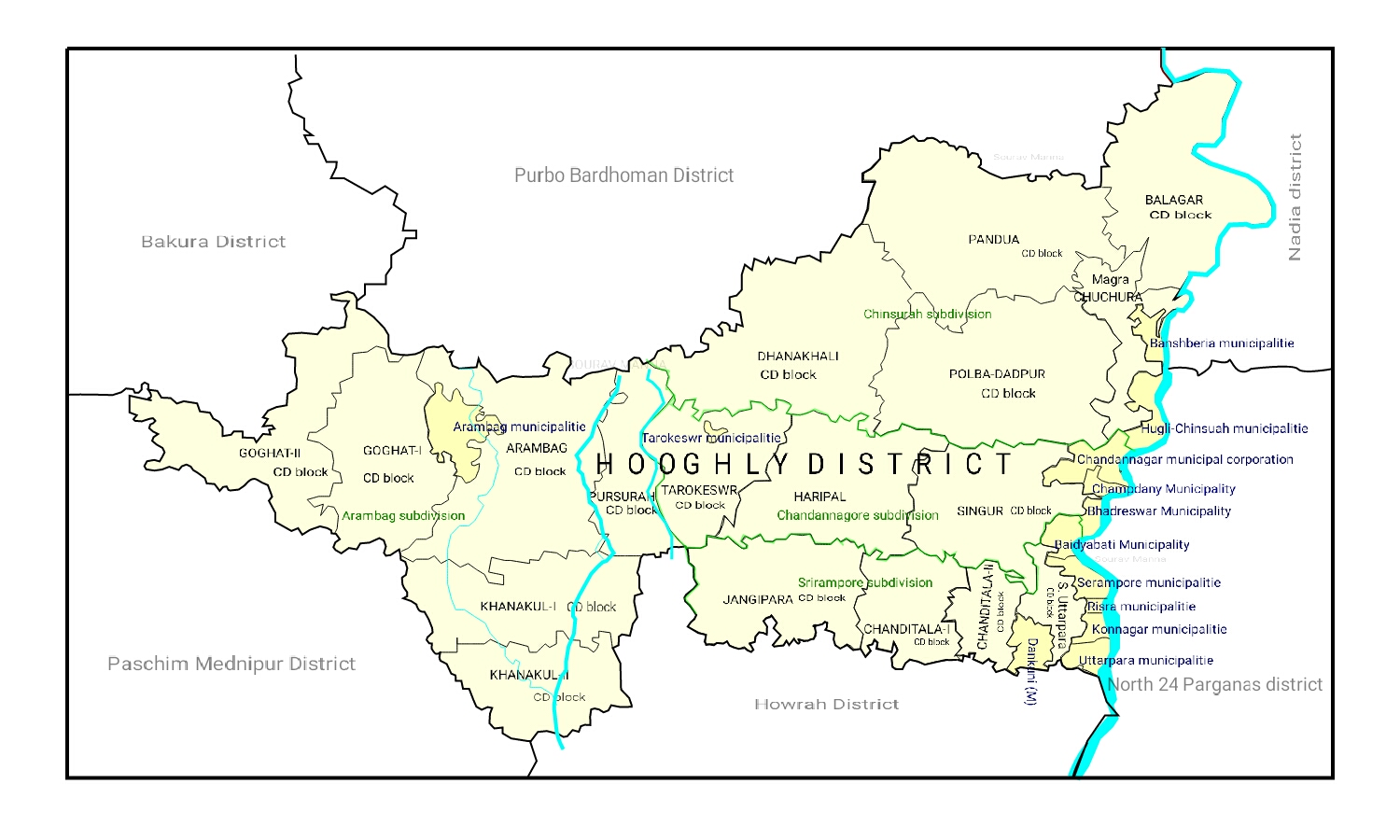
Map of Hooghly district showing CD blocks and municipal areas

== Demographics ==
As per 2011 Census of India Gopalpur had a population of 901, of which 459 (51%) were males and 442 (49%) were females. Population below 6 years was 79. The number of literates in Gopalpur was 733 (89.17% of the population over 6 years).

== Transport ==
Bargachia railway station and Baruipara railway station are the nearest railway stations.
