= Shyamsundarpur, Chanditala-I =

Shyamsundarpur
- Village
- Location in West Bengal, India Shyamsundarpur (India)
- Coordinates: 22.728605°N 88.149875°E
- Country: India
- State: West Bengal
- District: Hooghly

Government
  - Body: Gram panchayat

Population (2011)
  - Total: 2,028

Languages
  - Official: Bengali, English
- Time zone: UTC+5:30 (IST)
- PIN: 712701
- ISO 3166 code: IN-WB
- Vehicle registration: WB
- Lok Sabha constituency: Serampore
- Vidhan Sabha constituency: Chanditala
- Website: wb.gov.in

Shyamsundarpur is a village in Chanditala I community development block of Srirampore subdivision in Hooghly district in the Indian state of West Bengal.

== Geography ==
Shyamsundarpur is located at 22.728605°N 88.149875°E.

=== Gram panchayat ===
Villages in Ainya gram panchayat are: Akuni, Aniya, Bandpur, Banipur, Bara Choughara, Dudhkanra, Ganeshpur, Goplapur, Jiara, Kalyanbati, Mukundapur, Sadpur and Shyamsundarpur.

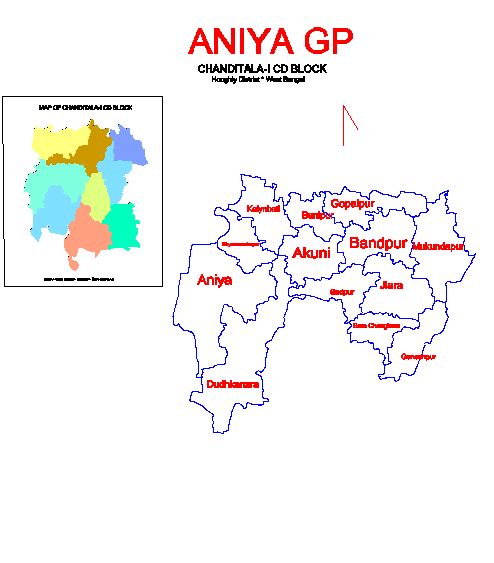
Map of Aniya GP

== Demographics ==
As per 2011 Census of India Shyamsundarpur had a total population of 2,028 of which 1,050 (52%) were males and 978 (48%) were females. Population below 6 years was 216. The total number of literates in Shyamsundarpur was 1,506 (83.11% of the population over 6 years).

== Transport ==
Shyamsundarpur is on Munshirhat-Mosat Road. Bargachia railway station and Baruipara railway station are the nearest railway stations.
