= Jagmohanpur =

- Village
- Location in West Bengal, India Jagmohanpur (India)
- Coordinates: 22.7130798°N 88.163115°E
- Country: India
- State: West Bengal
- District: Hooghly

Government
  - Body: Gram panchayat

Population (2011)
  - Total: 1,193

Languages
  - Official: Bengali, English
- Time zone: UTC+5:30 (IST)
- PIN: 712701
- ISO 3166 code: IN-WB
- Vehicle registration: WB
- Lok Sabha constituency: Serampore
- Vidhan Sabha constituency: Chanditala
- Website: wb.gov.in

Jagmohanpur is a village in Chanditala I community development block of Srirampore subdivision in Hooghly district in the Indian state of West Bengal.

== Geography ==
Jagmohanpur is located at 22.7130798°N 88.163115°E.

=== Gram panchayat ===
Villages in Haripur gram panchayat are: Anantarampur, Bade Sola, Baghati, Ban Panchbere, Chak Bangla, Chota Choughara, Dudhkomra, Haripur, Ichhapasar, Jagmohanpur, Mamudpur and Radhaballabhpur.

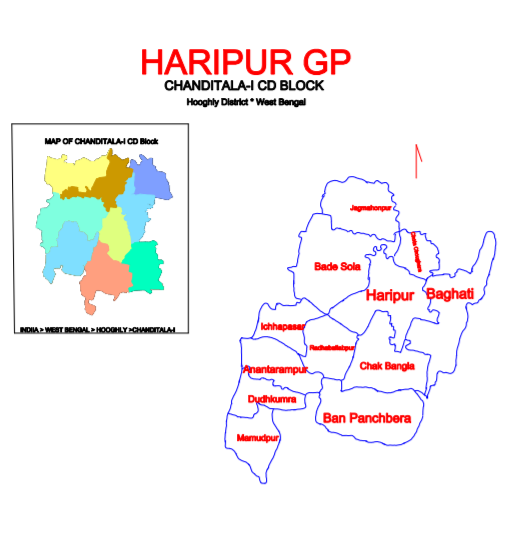
Map of Haripur GP

== Demographics ==
As per 2011 Census of India Jagmohanpur had a population of 1,193 of which 600 (50%) were males and 593 (50%) females. Population below 6 years was 105. The number of literates in Jagmohanpur was 944 (86.76% of the population over 6 years).

== Transport ==
Bara Choughara Street links the village to Munsirhat-Mosat Road. Bargachia railway station and Baruipara railway station are the nearest railway stations.

== Culture ==
Jatiya Sadharan Pathagar at Jagmohanpur was established in 1961.
