= Bandpur, Chanditala-I =

Bandpur
- Village
- Location in West Bengal, India Bandpur (India)
- Coordinates: 22.8408091°N 88.1602°E
- Country: India
- State: West Bengal
- District: Hooghly

Government
  - Body: Gram panchayat

Population (2011)
  - Total: 3,594

Languages
  - Official: Bengali, English
- Time zone: UTC+5:30 (IST)
- PIN: 712704
- ISO 3166 code: IN-WB
- Vehicle registration: WB
- Lok Sabha constituency: Serampore
- Vidhan Sabha constituency: Chanditala
- Website: wb.gov.in

Bandpur is a village in Chanditala I community development block of Srirampore subdivision in Hooghly district in the Indian state of West Bengal.

== Geography ==
Bandpur is located at 22.8408091°N 88.1602°E.

=== Gram panchayat ===
Villages in Ainya gram panchayat are: Akuni, Aniya, Bandpur, Banipur, Bara Choughara, Dudhkanra, Ganeshpur, Goplapur, Jiara, Kalyanbati, Mukundapur, Sadpur and Shyamsundarpur.

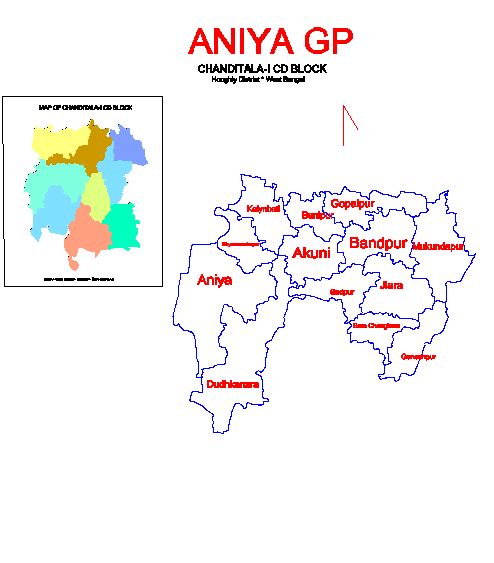
Map of Aniya GP

== Demographics ==
As per 2011 Census of India Bandpur had a population of 3,594 of which 1,825 (51%) were males and 1,769 (49%) females. Population below 6 years was 494. The number of literates in Bandpur was 2,574 (83.03% of the population over 6 years).

== Transport ==
The nearest railway stations are the Bargachia railway station and the Baruipara railway station.
