= Dudhkanra =

- Village
- Location in West Bengal, India Dudhkanra (India)
- Coordinates: 22.7022086°N 88.150145°E
- Country: India
- State: West Bengal
- District: Hooghly

Government
  - Type: Panchayati raj (India)
  - Body: Gram panchayat

Population (2011)
  - Total: 391

Languages
  - Official: Bengali, English
- Time zone: UTC+5:30 (IST)
- PIN: 712701
- ISO 3166 code: IN-WB
- Vehicle registration: WB
- Lok Sabha constituency: Serampore
- Vidhan Sabha constituency: Chanditala
- Website: wb.gov.in

Dudhkanra is a village in Chanditala I community development block of Srirampore subdivision in Hooghly district in the Indian state of West Bengal.

== Geography ==
Dudhkanra is located at 22.7022086°N 88.150145°E.

=== Gram panchayat ===
Villages in Ainya gram panchayat are: Akuni, Aniya, Bandpur, Banipur, Bara Choughara, Dudhkanra, Ganeshpur, Goplapur, Jiara, Kalyanbati, Mukundapur, Sadpur and Shyamsundarpur.

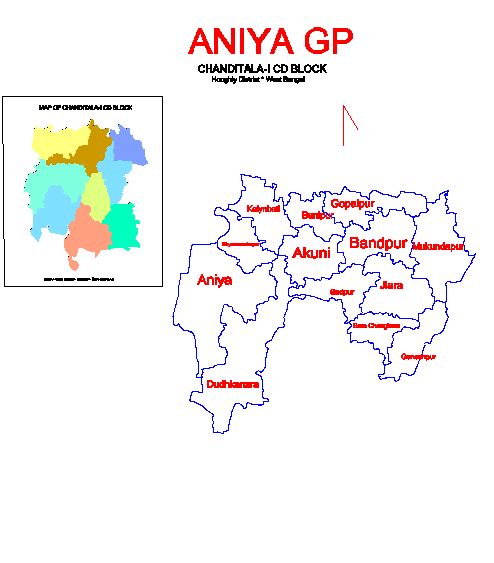
Map of Aniya GP

== Demographics ==
As per 2011 Census of India Dudhkanra had a population of 391 of which 206 (53%) were males and 185 (47%) were females. Population below 6 years was 46. The total number of literates in Aniya was 284 (82.32% of the population over 6 years).

== Economy ==
This village is known mainly for its exquisite strawberry fruit in the region.

== Transport ==
Bargachia railway station is the nearest railway station.
