= Haripur, Chanditala-I =

Haripur
- Village
- Location in West Bengal, India Haripur (India)
- Coordinates: 22.7015782°N 88.1649503°E
- Country: India
- State: West Bengal
- District: Hooghly

Government
  - Body: Gram panchayat

Population (2011)
  - Total: 2,797

Languages
  - Official: Bengali, English
- Time zone: UTC+5:30 (IST)
- PIN: 712701
- ISO 3166 code: IN-WB
- Vehicle registration: WB
- Lok Sabha constituency: Serampore
- Vidhan Sabha constituency: Chanditala
- Website: wb.gov.in

Haripur is a village and gram panchayat in Chanditala I community development block of Srirampore subdivision in Hooghly district in the Indian state of West Bengal.

== Geography ==
Haripur is located at 22.7015782°N 88.1649503°E.

=== Gram panchayat ===
Villages in Haripur gram panchayat are: Anantarampur, Bade Sola, Baghati, Ban Panchbere, Chak Bangla, Chota Choughara, Dudhkomra, Haripur, Ichhapasar, Jagmohanpur, Mamudpur and Radhaballabhpur.

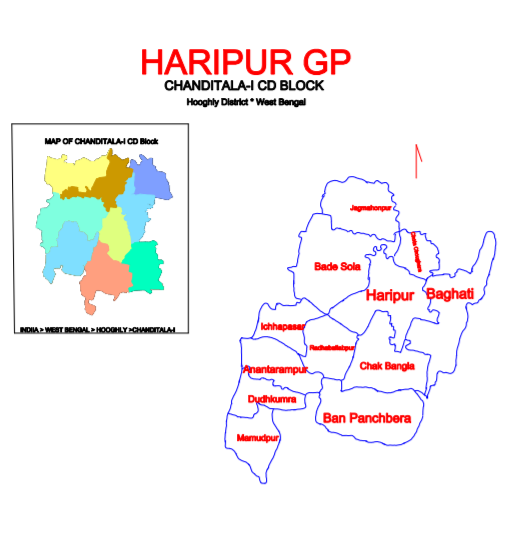
Map of Haripur GP

Map of Chanditala-I CD block sowing GP

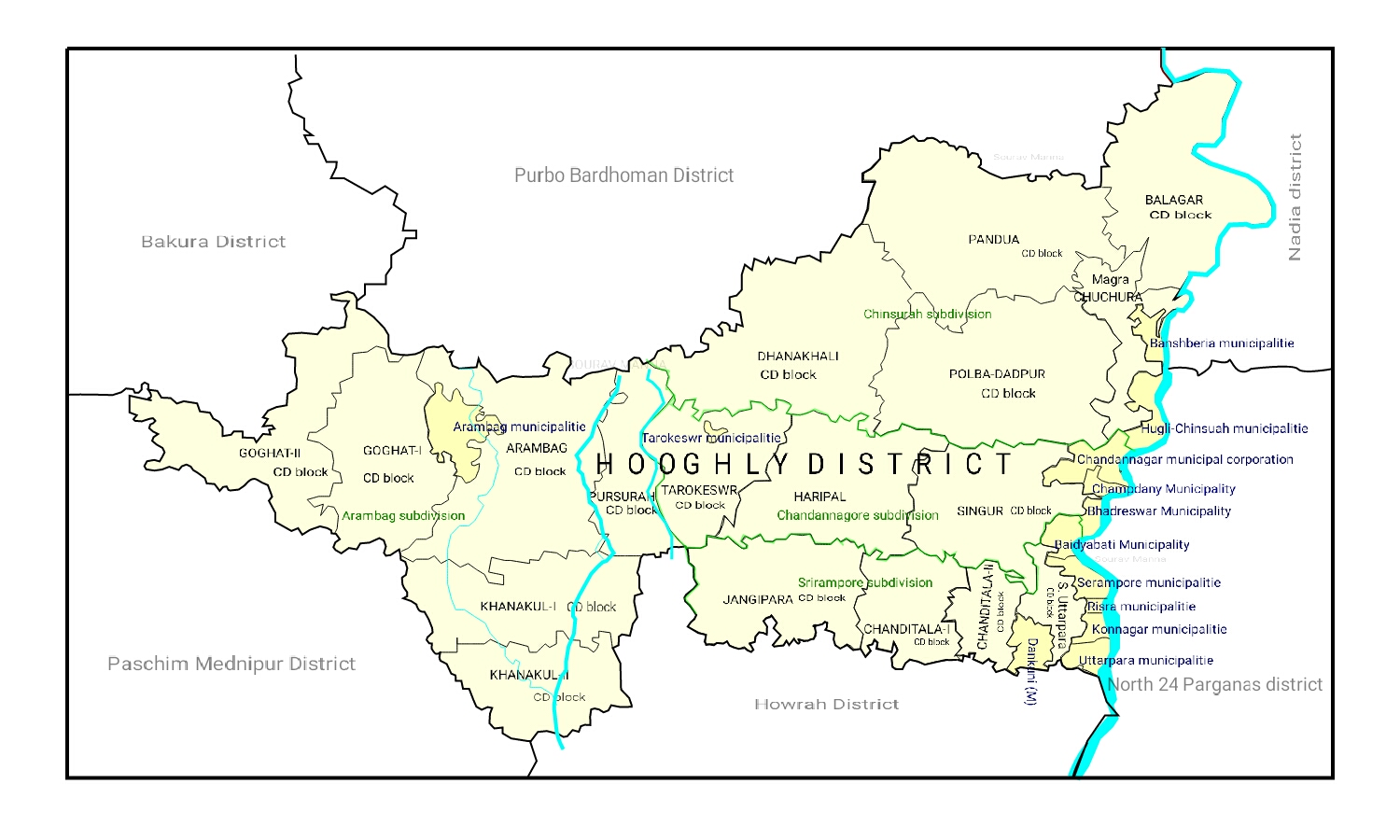
Map of Hooghly district showing CD blocks and municipal areas

== Demographics ==
As per 2011 Census of India, Haripur had a population of 2,797 of which 1,455 (52%) were males and 1,342 (48%) females. Population below 6 years was 271. The number of literates in Haripur was 2,066 (81.79% of the population over 6 years).

== Transport ==
Bargachia railway station is the nearest railway station.
