= Jiara =

- Village
- Location in West Bengal, India Jiara (India)
- Coordinates: 22.722750°N 88.177985°E
- Country: India
- State: West Bengal
- District: Hooghly

Government
  - Body: Gram panchayat

Population (2011)
  - Total: 1,150

Languages
  - Official: Bengali, English
- Time zone: UTC+5:30 (IST)
- PIN: 712704
- ISO 3166 code: IN-WB
- Vehicle registration: WB
- Lok Sabha constituency: Serampore
- Vidhan Sabha constituency: Chanditala
- Website: wb.gov.in

Jiara is a village in Chanditala I community development block of Srirampore subdivision in Hooghly district in the Indian state of West Bengal.

== Geography ==
Jiara is located at 22.722750°N 88.177985°E.

=== Gram panchayat ===
Villages in Ainya gram panchayat are: Akuni, Aniya, Bandpur, Banipur, Bara Choughara, Dudhkanra, Ganeshpur, Goplapur, Jiara, Kalyanbati, Mukundapur, Sadpur and Shyamsundarpur.

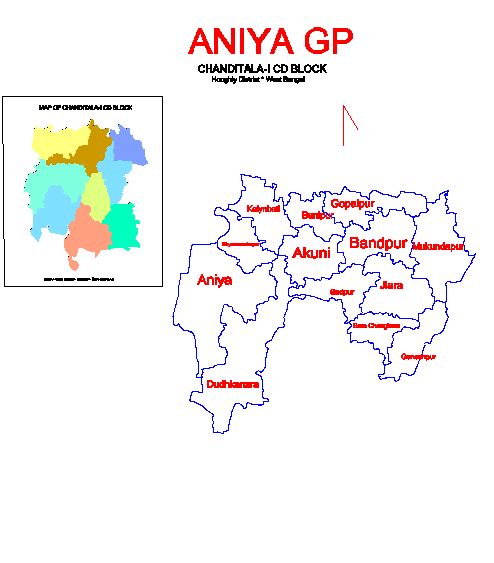
Map of Aniya GP

== Demographics ==
As per 2011 Census of India Jiara had a population of 1,150, of which 579 (50%) were males and 571 (50%) females. Population below 6 years was 125. The number of literates in Jiara was 841(82.05% of the population over 6 years).

== Transport ==
Baruipara railway station is the nearest railway station.
