= Akuni =

- Village
- Location in West Bengal, India Akuni (India)
- Coordinates: 22.72851°N 88.16224°E
- Country: India
- State: West Bengal
- District: Hooghly

Government
  - Body: Gram panchayat

Population (2011)
  - Total: 3,759

Languages
  - Official: Bengali, English
- Time zone: UTC+5:30 (IST)
- ISO 3166 code: IN-WB
- Vehicle registration: WB
- Lok Sabha constituency: Serampore
- Vidhan Sabha constituency: jangipara
- Website: wb.gov.in

Akuni is a village in Chanditala I community development block of Srirampore subdivision in Hooghly district in the Indian state of West Bengal.

== Geography ==
Akuni is located at 22.72851°N 88.16224°E.

=== Gram panchayat ===
Villages in Ainya gram panchayat are: Akuni, Aniya, Bandpur, Banipur, Bara Choughara, Dudhkanra, Ganeshpur, Goplapur, Jiara, Kalyanbati, Mukundapur, Sadpur and Shyamsundarpur.

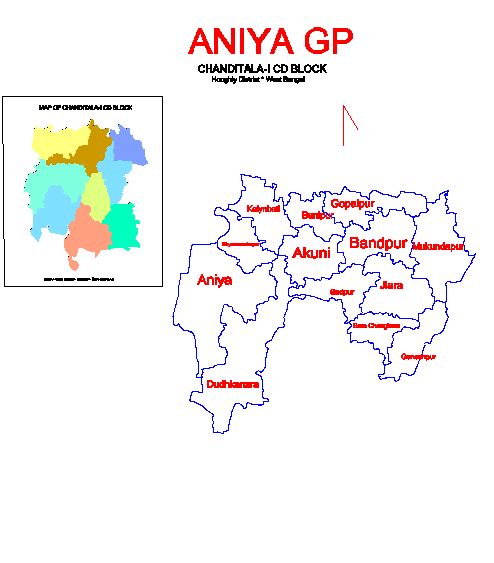
Map of Aniya GP

== Demographics ==
As per 2011 Census of India Akuni had a total population of 3,759 of which 1,859 (49%) were males and 1,900 (51%) were females. Population below 6 years was 511. The total number of literates in Akuni was 2,590 (79.74% of the population over 6 years).

== Education ==
Akuni B.G. Biharilal Institution is a coeducational higher secondary school at Akuni. It has arrangements for teaching Bengali, English, history, philosophy, political science, economics, eco-geography, education, accountancy, business economics & mathematics, mathematics, physics, chemistry, bio-science, computer application and computer science.

== Healthcare ==
Akuni Ichhapasar Rural Hospital at Aniya functions with 30 beds.

== Transport ==
Bargachia railway station and Baruipara railway station are the nearest railway stations.
