= Kanaidanga =

- Village
- Location in West Bengal, India Kanaidanga (India)
- Coordinates: 22.6670725°N 88.176223°E
- Country: India
- State: West Bengal
- District: Hooghly

Government
  - Type: Panchayati raj (India)
  - Body: Gram panchayat

Population (2019)
  - Total: 7,309

Languages
  - Official: Bengali, English
- Time zone: UTC+5:30 (IST)
- PIN: 712701
- ISO 3166 code: IN-WB
- Lok Sabha constituency: Serampore
- Vidhan Sabha constituency: Chanditala
- Website: www.kanaidanga.wb.in

Kanaidanga is a village in Chanditala I community development block of Srirampore subdivision in Hooghly district in the Indian state of West Bengal.

== Geography ==
Kanaidanga is located at 22.6670725°N 88.176223°E.

=== Gram panchayat ===
Villages and census towns in Bhagabatipur gram panchayat are: Bhadua, Bhagabatipur, Jalamadul, Kanaidanga, Metekhal and Singjor.

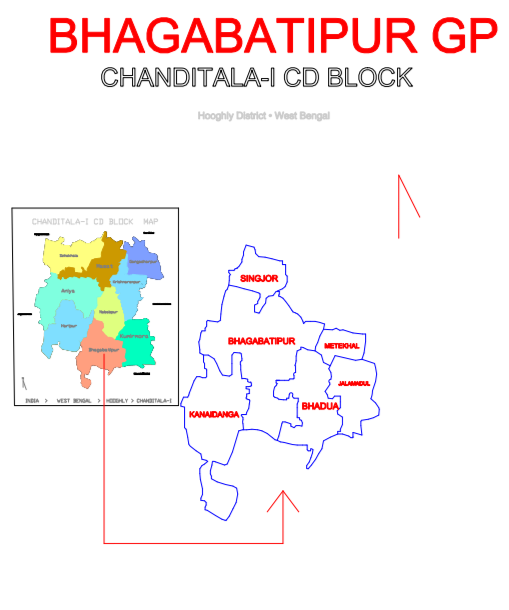
Map of BHAGABATIPUR GP

== Demographics ==
As per 2011 Census of India, Kanaidanga had a population of 4,517 of which 2,268 (50%) were males and 2,249 (50%) were females. Population below 6 years was 523. The number of literates in Kanaidanga was 3,000 (75.11% of the population over 6 years).
