= Chanditala I =

- Community development block
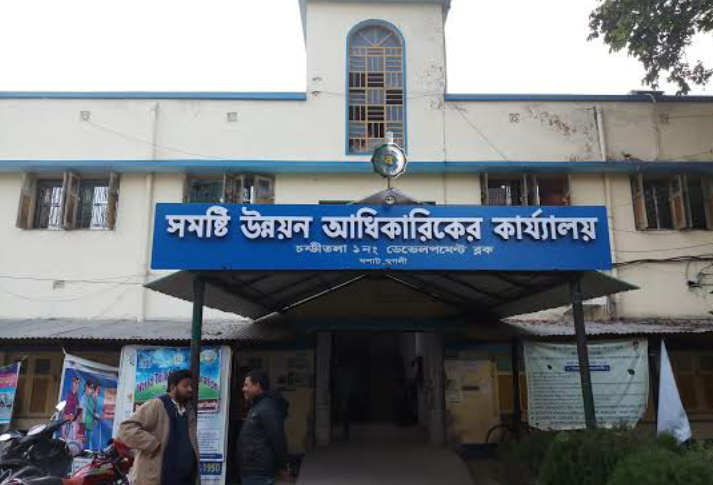
- Chanditala-I CD block office

- Coordinates: 22.6999504°N 88.1804752°E
- Country: India
- State: West Bengal
- District: Hooghly

Government
  - Type: Representative democracy

Area
  - Total: 93.45 km^{2} (36.08 sq mi)

Population (2011)
  - Total: 179,825
  - Density: 1,924/km^{2} (4,984/sq mi)

Languages
  - Official: Bengali, English
- Time zone: UTC+5:30 (IST)
- PIN: 712701 (Masat); 712704 (Kumirmorah); 712705 (Kristarampur)
- Telephone/STD code: 03214
- ISO 3166 code: IN-WB
- Vehicle registration: WB 15, WB 16, WB 18
- Literacy: 83.76%
- Lok Sabha constituency: Sreerampur
- Vidhan Sabha constituency: Chanditala, Jangipara
- Website: hooghly.gov.in

Chanditala I is a community development block that forms an administrative division in Srirampore subdivision of Hooghly district in the Indian state of West Bengal.

== Overview ==
The Chanditala I CD block is part of the Hooghly-Damodar Plain, one of the three natural regions in the district of the flat alluvial plains, that forms part of the Gangetic Delta. The region has many depressions which receive water from the surrounding lands during the rainy season and discharge the water through small channels.

== Geography ==
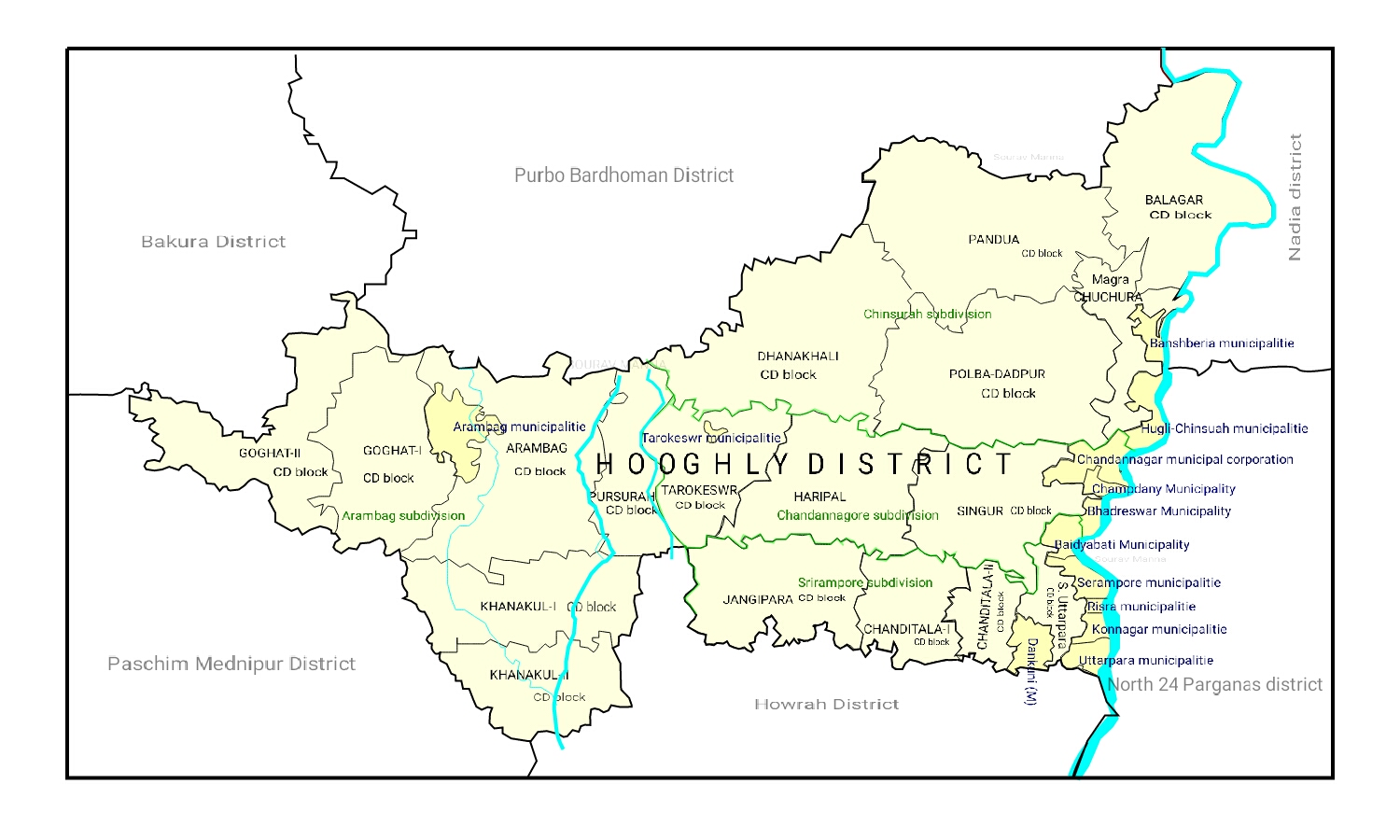
Map of Hooghly district showing CD blocks and municipal areas

Bhagabatipur, a constituent gram panchayat of Chanditala I block, is located at 22°42′00″N 88°10′50″E.

Chanditala I CD block is bounded by Haripal and Singur CD blocks in the north, Chanditala II CD block in the east, Domjur and Jagatballavpur CD blocks, in Howrah district, in the south and Jangipara CD block in the west.

It is located 34 km from Chinsurah, the district headquarters.

Chanditala I CD block has an area of 93.45 km^{2}. It has 1 panchayat samity, 9 gram panchayats, 148 gram sansads (village councils), 56 mouzas and 47 inhabited villages. Chanditala police station serves this block. The headquarters of this CD block is at Masat.

Map of Chanditala-I CD block showing GP

Gram panchayats of Chanditala I block/ panchayat samiti are: Aniya, Bhagabatipur, Gangadharpur, Haripur, Krishnarampur, Kumirmora, Masat, Nababpur and Sehakhala.

== Demographics ==
=== Population ===
As per the 2011 Census of India, Chanditala I CD block had a total population of 179,825, of which 104,677 were rural and 75,148 were urban. There were 90,032 (50%) males and 89,793 (50%) females. Population below 6 years was 19,350. Scheduled Castes numbered 35,243 (19.60%) and Scheduled Tribes numbered 281 (0.16%).

As of 2001 census, Chanditala I block had a total population of 165,837, out of which 81,689 were males and 84,148 were females. Chanditala I block registered a population growth of 11.38% during the 1991-2001 decade. Decadal growth for Hooghly district was 15.72%. Decadal growth in West Bengal was 17.84%.

Census Towns in Chanditala I CD block (2011 census figures in brackets): Masat (8,007), Jangalpara (7,478), Gangadharpur (7,862), Manirampur (7,428), Dudhkalmi (5,558), Nababpur (12,728), Kumirmora (12,208), Ramanathpur (6,811) and Bhagabatipur (7,068).

Large villages (4,000+ population) in Chanditala I CD block (2011 census figures in brackets): Patul (4,083), Sehakhala (6,434), Kanaidanga (4,517), Bhadua (4,704) and Krishnarampur (10,044).

Other villages in Chanditala I CD block (2011 census figures in brackets): Akuni (3,759), Alipur (3,091), Anantarampur (1,582), Aniya (3,281), Aushbati (2,246), Azabnagar (1,021), Bade Sola (2,094), Baghati (1,263), Ban Panchbere (465), Banamalipur (3,443), Bandpur (3,594), Banipur (840), Bankrishnapur (1,610), Bara Choughara (788), Chak Bangla (340), Chak Tajpur (2,692), Chota Choughara (1196), Dudhkanra (391), Dudhkomra (1,692), Ganeshpur (474), Gopalpur (901), Haripur (2,757), Ichhapasar (1,442), Jagmohanpur (1,193), Jalamadul (2,293), Jiara (1,150), Kalyanbati (1,217), Krishnanagar (1,712), Madhupur (1,846), Malipukur (945), Mamudpur (1,522), Metekhal (3,006), Mukundapur (1,579), Pakur, (3,997), Paschim Tajpur (1,873), Radhaballabhpur (1,655), Raghunathpur (645), Sadpur (888), Sandhipur (2,186), Shyamsundarpur (2,028), Singjor (1,589) and Suchiya(Chhunche) (2,569).

=== Literacy ===
As per the 2011 census the total number of literates in Chanditala I CD block was 134,421 (83.76% of the population over 6 years), of whom males numbered 70,740 (88.24% of the male population over 6 years) and females numbered 63,681 (79.65% of the female population over 6 years). The gender disparity (the difference between female and male literacy rates) was 8.59%.

As of 2001 census, Chanditala I block had a total literacy of 52.75%. While male literacy was 73.52%, female literacy was 55.09%.

See also – List of West Bengal districts ranked by literacy rate

Literacy in CD blocks of
Hooghly district
Arambagh subdivision
Arambagh – 79.10
Khanakul I – 77.73
Khanakul II – 79.16
Goghat I – 78.70
Goghat II – 77.24
Pursurah – 82.12
Chandannagar subdivision
Haripal – 78.59
Singur – 84.01
Tarakeswar – 79.96
Chinsurah subdivision
Balagarh – 76.94
Chinsurah Mogra – 83.01
Dhaniakhali – 75.66
Pandua – 75.86
Polba Dadpur – 75.14
Srirampore subdivision
Chanditala I – 83.76
Chanditala II – 84.78
Jangipara – 75.34
Sreerampur Uttarpara – 87.33
Source: 2011 Census: CD Block Wise
Primary Census Abstract Data

=== Language and religion ===
Religion in Chanditala I CD block (2011)
Hinduism	65.23%
Islam	34.60%
Other or not stated	0.17%

As per the 2011 census, majority of the population of the district belong to the Hindu community with a population share of 82.9% followed by Muslims at 15.8%. The percentage of the Hindu population of the district has followed a decreasing trend from 87.1% in 1961 to 82.9% in the latest census 2011. On the other hand, the percentage of Muslim population has increased from 12.7% in 1961 to 15.8% in 2011 census.

In the 2011 census Hindus numbered 117,300 and formed 65.23% of the population in Chanditala I CD block. Muslims numbered 62,225 and formed 34.60% of the population. Others numbered 300 and formed 0.17% of the population.

Bengali is the predominant language, spoken by 99.49% of the population.

== Rural poverty ==
As per poverty estimates obtained from household survey for families living below the poverty line in 2005, rural poverty in Chanditala I CD block was 9.07%.

== Economy ==
=== Livelihood ===
Livelihood
in Chanditala I CD block
1. Cultivators (9.24%)
2. Agricultural labourers (18.1%)
3. Household industries (10.4%)
4. Other Workers (62.2%)

In Chanditala I CD block in 2011, amongst the class of total workers, cultivators formed 9.24%, agricultural labourers 18.10%, household industry workers 10.41% and other workers 62.25%.

=== Infrastructure ===
There are 47 inhabited villages in Chanditala I CD block. 100% villages have power supply. 14 villages have more than one source of drinking water (tap, well, tube well, hand pump), 27 villages have only tube well/ borewell and 6 villages have only hand pump. Three villages have sub post offices and two villages have post and telegraph offices. 47 villages have landlines, 37 villages have public call offices and 47 villages have mobile phone coverage. 28 villages have pucca roads and 28 villages have bus service (public/ private). Two villages have agricultural credit societies and six villages have commercial/ co-operative banks.

Important handicrafts of Hooghly district
- Zari work on sari - Pandua, Pursurah, Jangipara, Tarakeswar and other blocks - 3,000 families involved
- Chikon embroidery – Babnan, Pandua, Singur - 2,500 families involved
- Silk and cotton printing – Serampore (Chanditala) - 300 families involved
- Brass and bell metal – Manikpat, Goghat, Arambagh - 150 families involved
- Conch shell – Pandua, Khanakul, Makla, Chandannagar
- Jute diversified product – Baidyabati, Mogra
- Terracota – Chinsurah, Chandannagar, Baidyabati, Mogra

=== Agriculture ===
Although a large proportion of the people are engaged in non-agricultural pursuits, this is a rich agricultural area with several cold storages. Along with rice, the prime crop of the district, the agricultural economy largely depends on potato, jute, vegetables, and orchard products. Vegetable is a prize crop in the blocks of Haripal, Singur, Chanditala, Polba and Dhaniakhali being grown in a relay system throughout the year. Potato is cultivated in all the blocks of this district.

Some of the primary and other hats or markets in the Chanditala I CD block area are Jangalpara hat, Mesat hat, Sheakhala hat, Bhagakalipur hat, Gopalpur hat and Gangadharpur hat.

In 2013-14, the comparatively small percentage of persons engaged in agriculture in Chanditala I CD Block could be classified as follows: bargadars 17.25%, patta (document) holders 5.23%, small farmers (possessing land between 1 and 2 hectares) 2.29%, marginal farmers (possessing land up to 1 hectare) 39.82% and agricultural labourers 35.41%.

Chanditala I CD block had 53 fertiliser depots, 15 seed stores and 59 fair price shops in 2013-14.

In 2013-14, Chanditala I CD block produced 341 tonnes of Aman paddy, the main winter crop from 167 hectares, 10,259 tonnes of Boro paddy (spring crop) from 3,097 hectares, 4,282 tonnes of jute from 202 hectares, 51,925 tonnes of potatoes from 1,854 hectares. It also produced pulses and oilseeds .

In 2013-14, the total area irrigated in Chanditala I CD block was 6,985 hectares, out of which 2,560 hectares were irrigated by canal water, 1,500 hectares by tank water, 620 hectares by deep tube wells and 2,305 hectares by shallow tube wells.

=== Banking ===
In 2013-14, Chanditala I CD block had offices of 12 commercial banks and 1 gramin bank.

== Transport ==
Chanditala I CD block has nine originating/ terminating bus routes.

== Education ==
In 2013-14, Chanditala I CD block had 94 primary schools with 9,796 students, 7 middle schools with 980 students, 6 high schools with 6,353 students and 12 higher secondary schools with 18,364 students. Chanditala I CD block had 1 general college with 1,301 students, 254 institutions for special and non-formal education with 7,114 students

Vidyasagar Mahavidyalaya, a general degree college, was established at Suchia, Masat in 1998.

In Chanditala I CD block, amongst the 47 inhabited villages, 2 villages had no school, 23 villages had more than 1 primary school, 31 villages had at least 1 primary school, 14 villages had at least 1 primary and 1 middle school and 10 villages had at least 1 middle and 1 secondary school.

== Healthcare ==
In 2014, Chanditala I CD block had 1 block primary health centre, 3 primary health centres and 6 private nursing homes with total 130 beds and 6 doctors (excluding private bodies). It had 32 family welfare subcentres. 2,696 patients were treated indoor and 233,480 patients were treated outdoor in the hospitals, health centres and subcentres of the CD block.

Chanditala I CD block has Akuni Ichhapasar Rural Hospital (with 30 beds) at PO Aniya, Bhattapur Primary Health Centre at PO Akuni (with 4 beds), Gangadharpur PHC (with 10 beds) and Jangalpara PHC (with 6 beds).

Chanditala I CD bBlock is one of the areas of Hooghly district where ground water is affected by low level of arsenic contamination. The WHO guideline for arsenic in drinking water is 10 mg/ litre, and the Indian Standard value is 50 mg/ litre. In Hooghly district, 16 blocks have arsenic levels above WHO guidelines and 11 blocks above Indian standard value. The maximum concentration in Chanditala I CD block is 33 mg/litre.

== Chanditala-I all GP map picture gallery ==
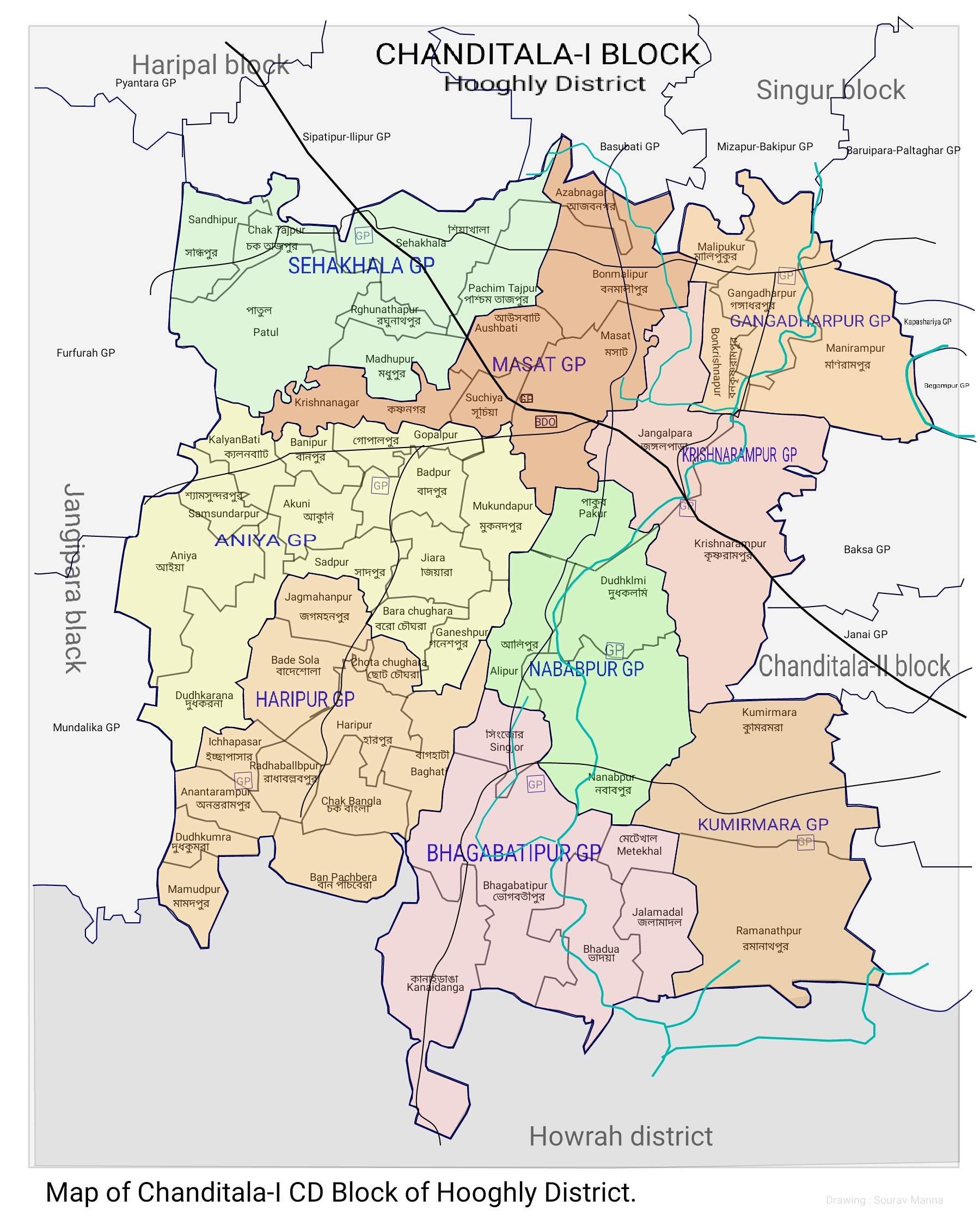
Map of Chanditala-I CD block

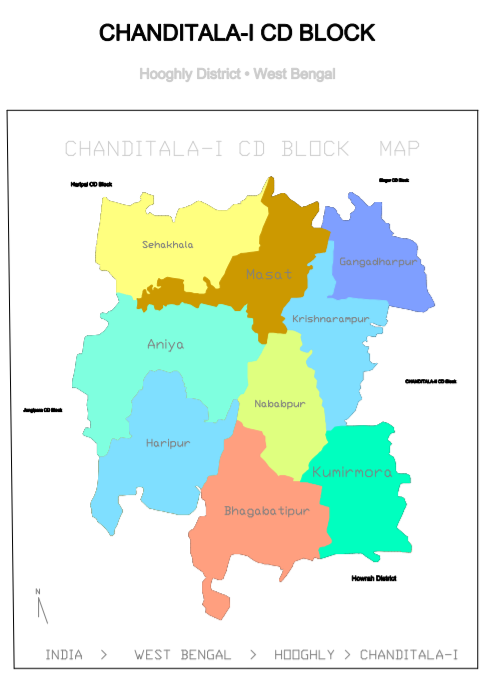
Map of Chanditala-i CD block

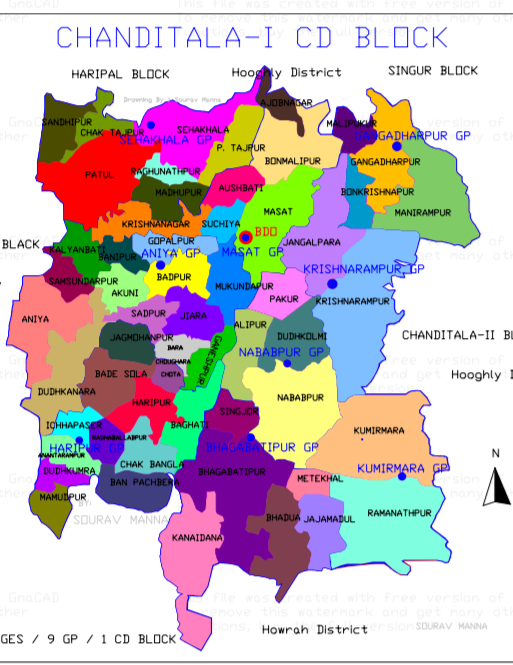
Map of Chanditala-I CD block showing 56 mouzas

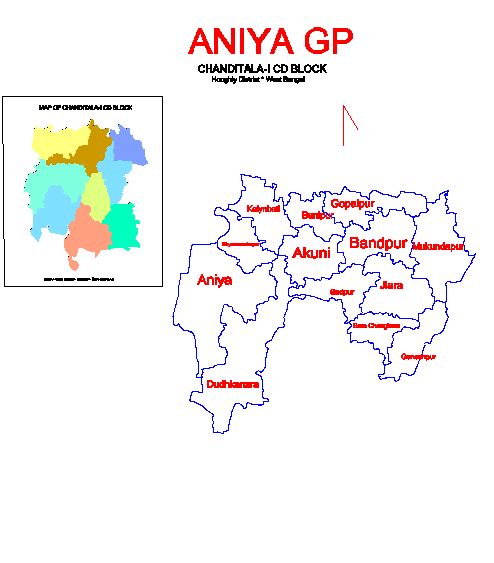
Map of Aniya GP

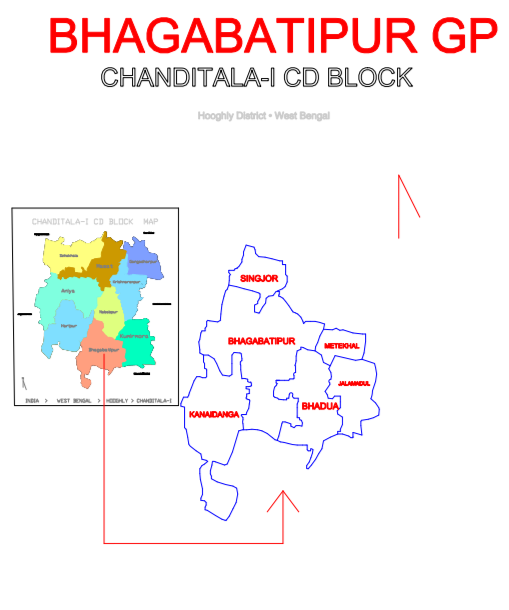
Map of Bhagabatipur GP

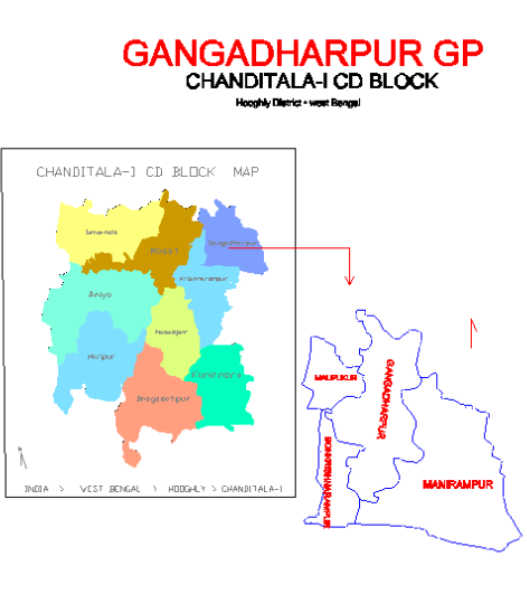
Map of Gangadharpur GP

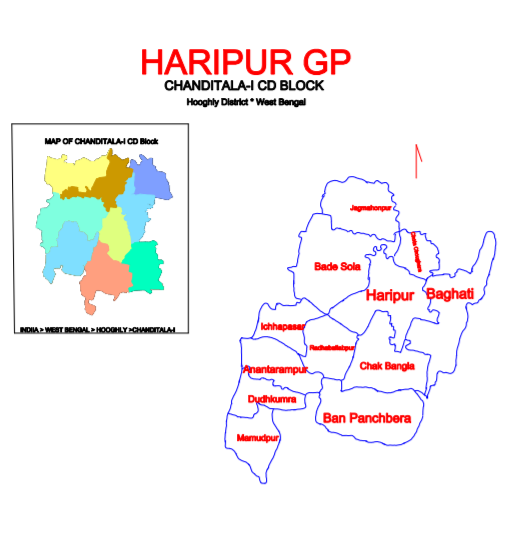
Map of Haripur GP

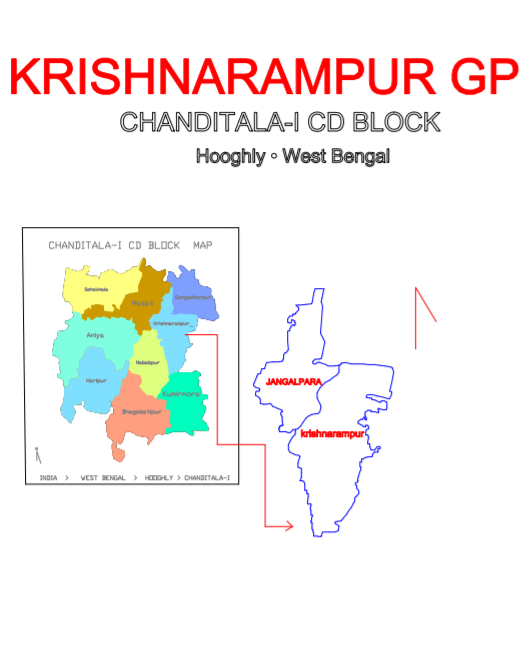
Map of Krishnarampur GP

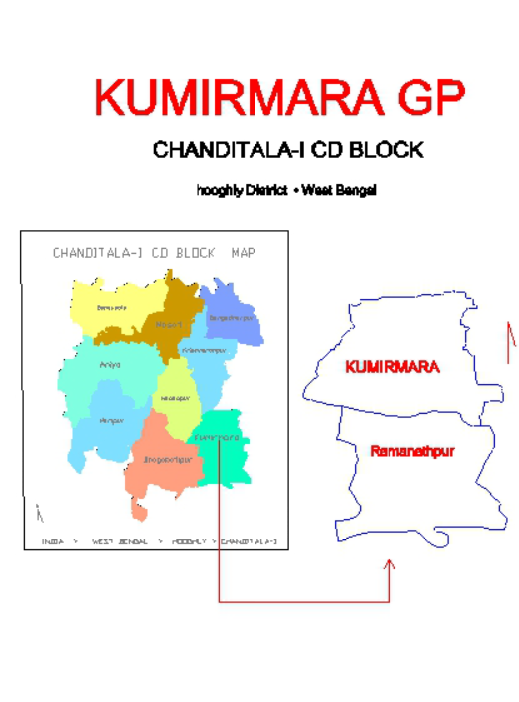
Map of Kumirmara GP

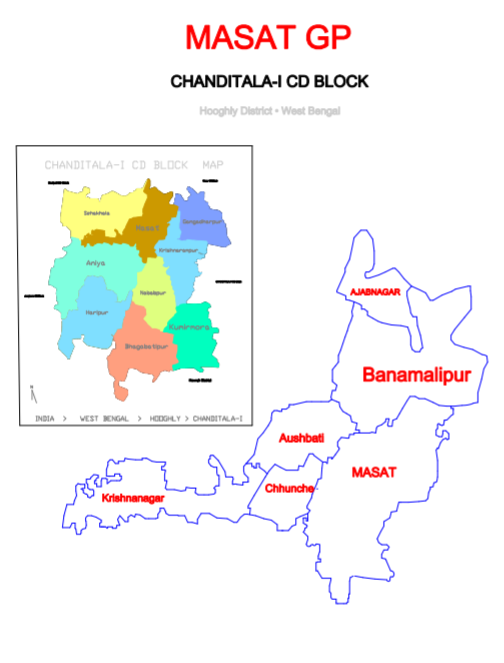
Map of Masat GP

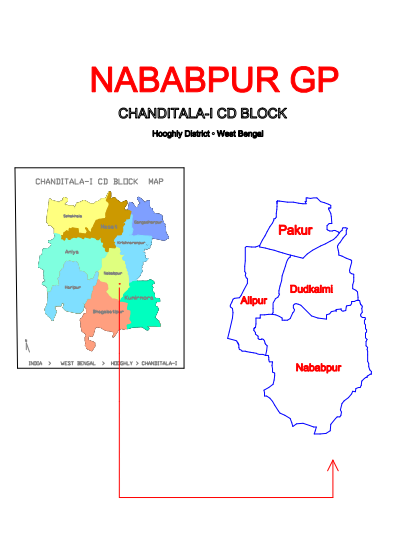
MAP of Nababpur GP

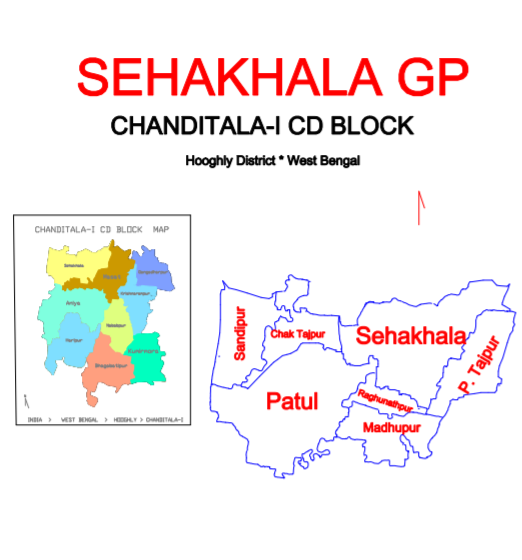
Map of Sehakhala GP
