= Ban Panchbere =

- Village
- Location in West Bengal, India Ban Panchbere (India)
- Coordinates: 22.6833359°N 88.1669596°E
- Country: India
- State: West Bengal
- District: Hooghly

Government
  - Body: Gram panchayat

Population (2011)
  - Total: 465

Languages
  - Official: Bengali, English
- Time zone: UTC+5:30 (IST)
- PIN: 712701
- ISO 3166 code: IN-WB
- Vehicle registration: WB
- Lok Sabha constituency: Serampore
- Vidhan Sabha constituency: Chanditala
- Website: wb.gov.in

Ban Panchbere is a village in Chanditala I community development block of Srirampore subdivision in Hooghly district in the Indian state of West Bengal.

== Geography ==
Ban Panchbere is located at 22.6833359°N 88.1669596°E.

=== Gram panchayat ===
Villages in Haripur gram panchayat are: Anantarampur, Bade Sola, Baghati, Ban Panchbere, Chak Bangla, Chota Choughara, Dudhkomra, Haripur, Ichhapasar, Jagmohanpur, Mamudpur and Radhaballabhpur.

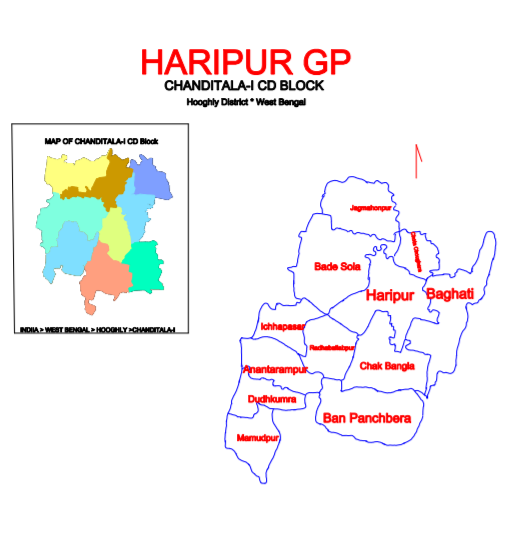
Map of Haripur GP

== Demographics ==
As per 2011 Census of India, Ban Panchbere had a population of 465 of which 231 (50%) were males and 234 (50%) were females. Population below 6 years was 59. The number of literates in Ban Panchbere was 297 (73.15% of the population over 6 years).
