= Metekhal =

- Village
- Location in West Bengal, India Metekhal (India)
- Coordinates: 22.6833471°N 88.2027801°E
- Country: India
- State: West Bengal
- District: Hooghly

Government
  - Body: Gram panchayat

Population (2011)
  - Total: 3,006

Languages
  - Official: Bengali, English
- Time zone: UTC+5:30 (IST)
- PIN: 712704
- ISO 3166 code: IN-WB
- Vehicle registration: WB
- Lok Sabha constituency: Serampore
- Vidhan Sabha constituency: Chanditala
- Website: wb.gov.in

Metekhal is a village in the Chanditala I community development block of Srirampore subdivision in the Hooghly district of the Indian state of West Bengal.

== Geography ==
Metekhal is located at 22.6833471°N 88.2027801°E.

=== Gram panchayat ===
Villages and census towns in Bhagabatipur gram panchayat are: Bhadua, Bhagabatipur, Jalamadul, Kanaidanga, Metekhal and Singjor.

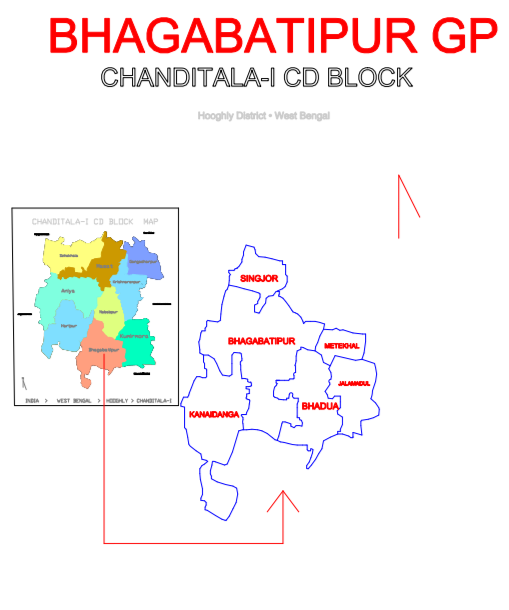
Map of BHAGABATIPUR GP

== Demographics ==
As per 2011 Census of India, Metekhal had a population of 3,006 of which 1,559 (52%) were males and 1,447 (48%) were females. Population below 6 years was 419. The number of literates in Metekhal was 2,266 (87.59% of the population over 6 years).
