= Ganeshpur, Chanditala-I =

Ganeshpur
- Village
- Location in West Bengal, India Ganeshpur (India)
- Coordinates: 22.7044234°N 88.1750038°E
- Country: India
- State: West Bengal
- District: Hooghly

Government
  - Body: Gram panchayat

Population (2011)
  - Total: 474

Languages
  - Official: Bengali, English
- Time zone: UTC+5:30 (IST)
- PIN: 712701
- ISO 3166 code: IN-WB
- Vehicle registration: WB
- Lok Sabha constituency: Serampore
- Vidhan Sabha constituency: Chanditala
- Website: wb.gov.in

Ganeshpur is a village in Chanditala community development block of Srirampore subdivision in Hooghly district in the Indian state of West Bengal.

== Geography ==
Ganeshpur is located at 22.7044234°N 88.1750038°E.

=== Gram panchayat ===
Villages in Ainya gram panchayat are: Akuni, Aniya, Bandpur, Banipur, Bara Choughara, Dudhkanra, Ganeshpur, Goplapur, Jiara, Kalyanbati, Mukundapur, Sadpur and Shyamsundarpur.

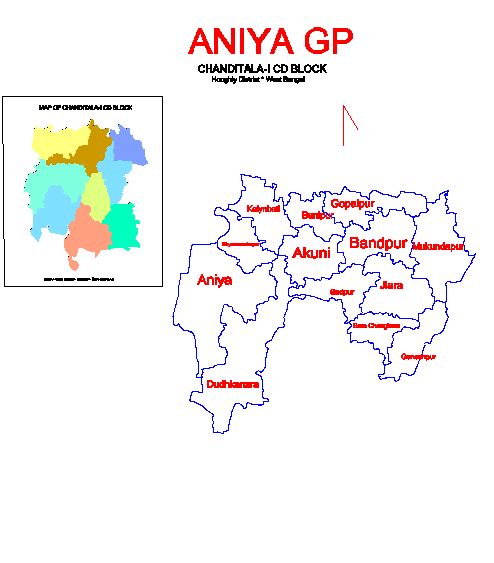
Map of Aniya GP

== Demographics ==
As per 2011 Census of India, Ganeshpur had a population of 474 of which 233 (49%) were males and 241 (51%) were females. Population below 6 years was 43. The number of literates in Ganeshpur was 316 (73.32% of the population over 6 years).

== Transport ==
Baruipara railway station is the nearest railway station.
