= Jalamadul =

- Village
- Location in West Bengal, India Jalamadul (India)
- Coordinates: 22.6695281°N 88.20519°E
- Country: India
- State: West Bengal
- District: Hooghly

Government
  - Type: Panchayati raj (India)
  - Body: Gram panchayat

Population (2011)
  - Total: 2,293

Languages
  - Official: Bengali, English
- Time zone: UTC+5:30 (IST)
- PIN: 712704
- ISO 3166 code: IN-WB
- Vehicle registration: WB
- Lok Sabha constituency: Serampore
- Vidhan Sabha constituency: Chanditala
- Website: wb.gov.in

Jalamadul is a village in Chanditala I community development block of Srirampore subdivision in Hooghly district in the Indian state of West Bengal.

== Geography ==
Jalamadul is located at 22.6695281°N 88.20519°E.

=== Gram panchayat ===
Villages and census towns in Bhagabatipur gram panchayat are: Bhadua, Bhagabatipur, Jalamadul, Kanaidanga, Metekhal and Singjor.

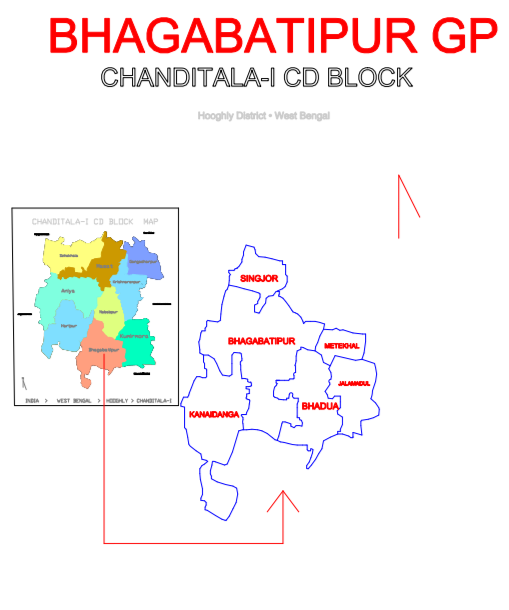
Map of BHAGABATIPUR GP

== Demographics ==
As per 2011 Census of India, Jalamadul had a population of 2,293 of which 1,114 (49%) were males and 1,179 (51%) females. Population below 6 years was 293. The number of literates in Jalamadul was 1,671 (83.55% of the population over 6 years).
