= Chota Choughara =

- Village
- Location in West Bengal, India Chota Choughara (India)
- Coordinates: 22.7031796°N 88.1723442°E
- Country: India
- State: West Bengal
- District: Hooghly

Government
  - Body: Gram panchayat

Population (2011)
  - Total: 1,196

Languages
  - Official: Bengali, English
- Time zone: UTC+5:30 (IST)
- PIN: 712701
- ISO 3166 code: IN-WB
- Vehicle registration: WB
- Lok Sabha constituency: Serampore
- Vidhan Sabha constituency: Chanditala
- Website: wb.gov.in

Chota Choughara is a village in Chanditala I community development block of Srirampore subdivision in Hooghly district in the Indian state of West Bengal.

== Geography ==
Chota Choughara is located at 22.7031796°N 88.1723442°E.

=== Gram panchayat ===
Villages in Haripur gram panchayat are: Anantarampur, Bade Sola, Baghati, Ban Panchbere, Chak Bangla, Chota Choughara, Dudhkomra, Haripur, Ichhapasar, Jagmohanpur, Mamudpur and Radhaballabhpur.

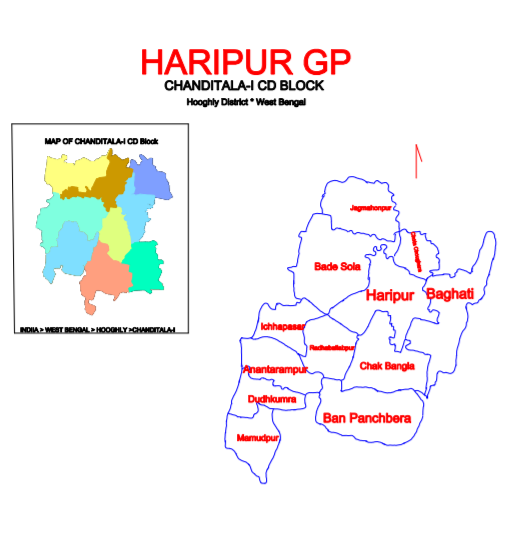
Map of Haripur GP

== Demographics ==
As per 2011 Census of India, Chota Choughara had a population of 1,196 of which 595 (50%) were males and 601 (50%) females. Population below 6 years was 102. The number of literates in Chota Choughara was 1,109 (92.23% of the population over 6 years).
