= Singjor =

- Village
- Location in West Bengal, India Singjor (India)
- Coordinates: 22.696374°N 88.18553°E
- Country: India
- State: West Bengal
- District: Hooghly

Government
  - Type: Panchayati raj (India)
  - Body: Gram panchayat

Population (2011)
  - Total: 1,589

Languages
  - Official: Bengali, English
- Time zone: UTC+5:30 (IST)
- PIN: 712701
- ISO 3166 code: IN-WB
- Vehicle registration: WB
- Lok Sabha constituency: Serampore
- Vidhan Sabha constituency: Chanditala
- Website: wb.gov.in

Singjor is a village in Chanditala I community development block of Srirampore subdivision in Hooghly district in the Indian state of West Bengal.

== Geography ==
Singjor is located at 22.696374°N 88.18553°E.

=== Gram panchayat ===
Villages and census towns in Bhagabatipur gram panchayat are: Bhadua, Bhagabatipur, Jalamadul, Kanaidanga, Metekhal and Singjor.

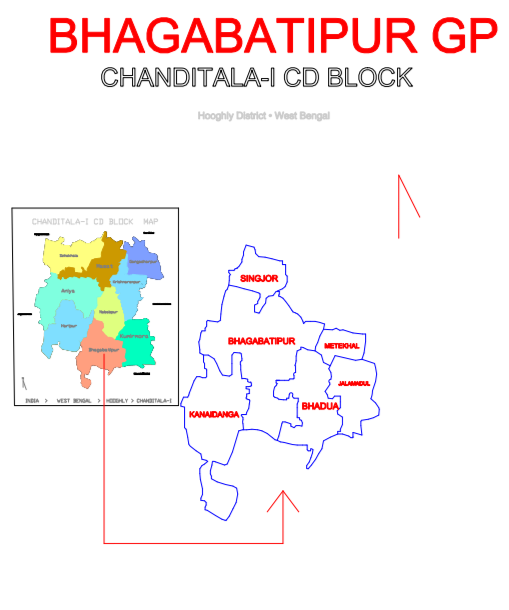
Map of BHAGABATIPUR GP

== Demographics ==
As per 2011 Census of India, Singjor had a total population of 1,589 of which 848 (53%) were males and 741 (47%) were females. Population below 6 years was 208. The total number of literates in Singhjor was 1,219 (88.27% of the population over 6 years).
