= Aniya =

- Village
- Location in West Bengal, India Aniya (India)
- Coordinates: 22.718945°N 88.1461499°E
- Country: India
- State: West Bengal
- District: Hooghly

Government
  - Type: Panchayati raj (India)
  - Body: Gram panchayat

Population (2011)
  - Total: 3,281

Languages
  - Official: Bengali, English
- Time zone: UTC+5:30 (IST)
- ISO 3166 code: IN-WB
- Vehicle registration: WB
- Lok Sabha constituency: Serampore
- Vidhan Sabha constituency: Jangipara
- Website: wb.gov.in

Aniya is a village and a gram panchayat in Chanditala I community development block of Srirampore subdivision in Hooghly district in West Bengal, India.

== Geography ==
Aniya is located at 22.718945°N 88.1461499°E.

=== Gram panchayat ===
Villages in Ainya gram panchayat are: Akuni, Aniya, Bandpur, Banipur, Bara Choughara, Dudhkanra, Ganeshpur, Goplapur, Jiara, Kalyanbati, Mukundapur, Sadpur and Shyamsundarpur.

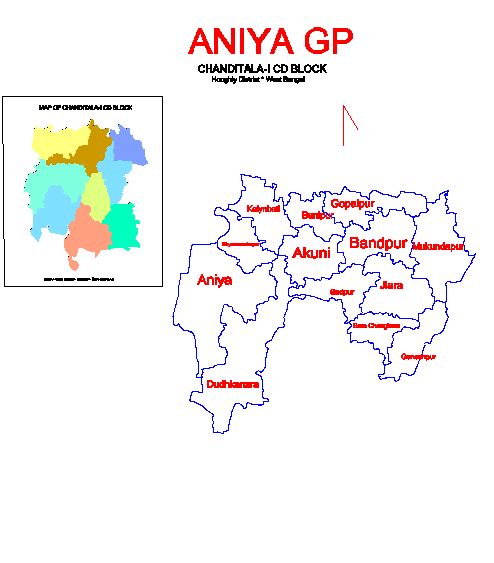
Map of Aniya GP

== Demographics ==
As per 2011 Census of India Aniya had a total population of 3,281 of which 1,588 (48%) were males and 1693 (52%) were females. Population below 6 years was 322. The total number of literates in Aniya was 2,477 (83.71% of the population over 6 years).

== Healthcare ==
Akuni Ichhapasar Rural Hospital at Aniya functions with 30 beds.

== Transport ==
Bargachia railway station and Baruipara railway station are the nearest railway stations.
