= Mamudpur =

- Village
- Location in West Bengal, India Mamudpur (India)
- Coordinates: 22.6783409°N 88.1479474°E
- Country: India
- State: West Bengal
- District: Hooghly

Government
  - Body: Gram panchayat

Population (2011)
  - Total: 1,522

Languages
  - Official: Bengali, English
- Time zone: UTC+5:30 (IST)
- PIN: 712701
- ISO 3166 code: IN-WB
- Vehicle registration: WB
- Lok Sabha constituency: Serampore
- Vidhan Sabha constituency: Chanditala
- Website: wb.gov.in

Mamudpur is a village in Chanditala I community development block of Srirampore subdivision in Hooghly district in the Indian state of West Bengal.

== Geography ==
Mamudpur is located at 22.6783409°N 88.1479474°E.

=== Gram panchayat ===
Villages in Haripur gram panchayat are: Anantarampur, Bade Sola, Baghati, Ban Panchbere, Chak Bangla, Chota Choughara, Dudhkomra, Haripur, Ichhapasar, Jagmohanpur, Mamudpur and Radhaballabhpur.

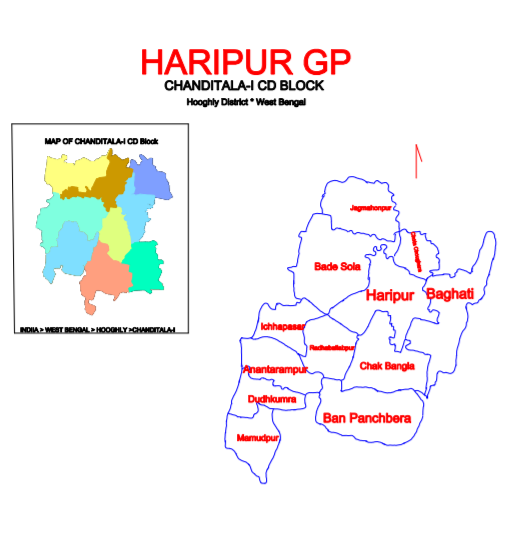
Map of Haripur GP

== Demographics ==
As per 2011 Census of India, Mamudpur had a population of 1,522, of which 731 (48%) were males and 791 (52%) females. Population below 6 years was 172. The number of literates in Mamudpur was 1,159 (85.85% of the population over 6 years).
