= Anantarampur =

- Village
- Location in West Bengal, India Anantarampur (India)
- Coordinates: 22.688584°N 88.151765°E
- Country: India
- State: West Bengal
- District: Hooghly

Government
  - Type: Panchayati raj (India)
  - Body: Gram panchayat

Population (2011)
  - Total: 1,582

Languages
  - Official: Bengali, English
- Time zone: UTC+5:30 (IST)
- ISO 3166 code: IN-WB
- Vehicle registration: WB
- Lok Sabha constituency: Serampore
- Vidhan Sabha constituency: Chanditala
- Website: wb.gov.in

Anantarampur is a village in Chanditala I community development block of Srirampore subdivision in Hooghly district in the Indian state of West Bengal.

== Geography ==
Anantarampur is located at 22.688584°N 88.151765°E.

=== Gram panchayat ===
Villages in Haripur gram panchayat are: Anantarampur, Bade Sola, Baghati, Ban Panchbere, Chak Bangla, Chota Choughara, Dudhkomra, Haripur, Ichhapasar, Jagmohanpur, Mamudpur and Radhaballabhpur.

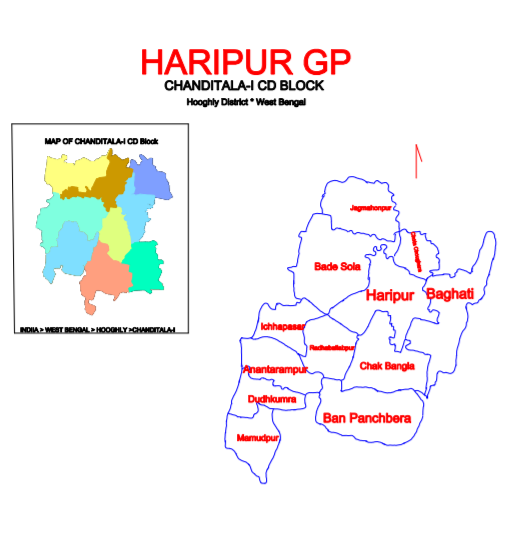
Map of Haripur GP

== Demographics ==
As per 2011 Census of India, Anantarampur had a population of 1,582, of which 845 (53%) were males and 737 (47%) females. Population below 6 years was 175. The total number of literates in Anantarampur was 1,163 (82.66% of the population over 6 years).
