= Swati Khandoker =

Indian politician

Member of the West Bengal Legislative Assembly
- Incumbent
- Assumed office May 2011
- Preceded by: Bhaktaram Pan
- Constituency: Chanditala

Personal details
- Party: All India Trinamool Congress (until 2026); Democratic Trinamool Congress (from 2026)

Swati Khandoker is an Indian politician. She was elected to the West Bengal Legislative Assembly from Chanditala as a member of the Democratic Trinamool Congress.
