= Azad Hind Fouz Smriti Mahavidyalaya =

College in West Bengal

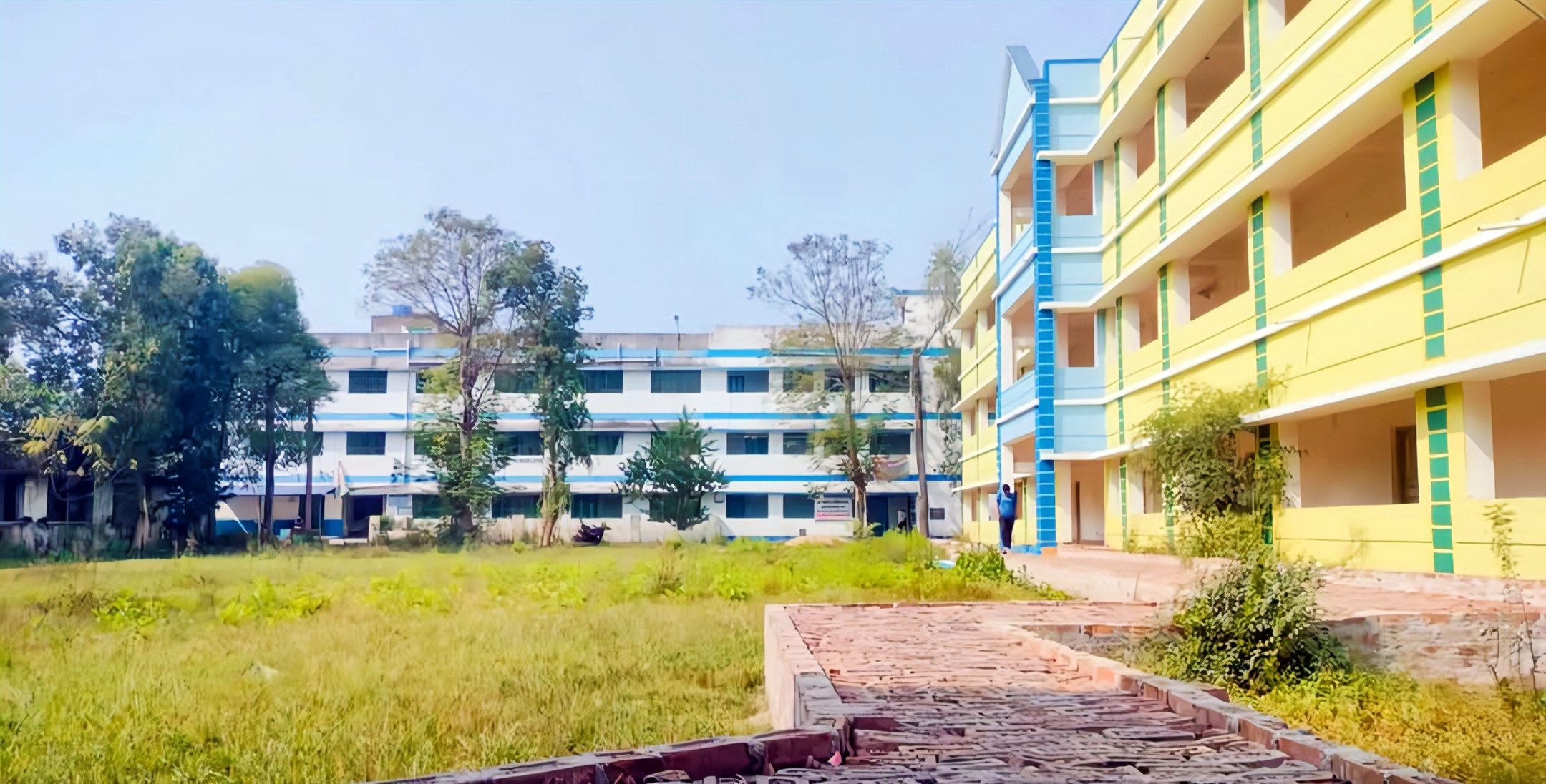
- Motto: śraddhāvān labhate jñānam
- Motto in English: One who has faith, attains knowledge
- Type: Undergraduate college
- Established: 1986; 40 years ago
- Affiliations: 1. Affiliated to the University of Calcutta; 2. Recognized by University Grants Commission (India) under 2F and 12B
- President: Sri. Durga Pada Golui
- Principal: Dr Supriyo Chakraborty
- Academic staff: 1. 24 (Male: 15 / Female: 9); 2. Full Time: 10 (Male: 7 / Female: 3); 3. State Aided College Teacher (SACT): 14 (Male: 8 / Female: 6)
- Administrative staff: 6 (Male: 5 / Female: 1)
- Students: 1384 (Male: 428 / Female: 956) 2022-2023
- Location: Domjur, West Bengal, 711405, India; 22.625349°N 88.233239°E
- Campus: Campus area: 9105 sq. mts. (2.25 acres) Built up area: 4564.744 sqr. mtrs.
- Website: http://ahfsm.ac.in/
- Location within West Bengal Location within India

Azad Hind Fouz Smriti Mahavidyalaya is an undergraduate liberal arts college in Domjur, West Bengal, India. It is in Howrah district. It is affiliated with the University of Calcutta.

== History ==
Azad Hind Fouz Smriti Mahavidyalaya, affiliated to the University of Calcutta, started its journey on 8 October 1986. The college is named after Netaji Subhas Chandra Bose and the Indian National Army (the ‘Azad Hind Fauj’ / ‘Free India Army’) honouring the indomitable spirit of Netaji Subhas Chandra Bose whose legacy is an inspiration to all. Netaji Subhas Chandra Bose had a well-considered view on education in India. He believed that the primary role of a college education is to acquire intellectual discipline and a critical frame of mind. According to him the goal of higher education in India should be to create a system that enables students to gain practical knowledge and apply their knowledge in real life. His belief that education should include arts and crafts echoes in the National Education Policy 2020(NEP) which emphasizes multidisciplinary learning encompassing academic and vocational streams. Azad Hind Fouz Smriti Mahavidyalaya is the only one in Domjur Block which is the largest block in the Howrah District of West Bengal spreading across an area of 97.3 sq. km. situated at a distance of 17 km from District Headquarter. The location of the college is ideal for an educational institution. It is far enough from the hub of overpopulated areas and yet easily accessible by bus and rail. As the College is located beside the Howrah – Amta Road, the facility of regular bus service can be availed of to reach the College. Hence students from the adjoining regions of the Howrah district come here for higher education.

== Legacy of Netaji & INA ==
Azad Hind Fouz Smriti Mahavidyalaya is named after Netaji Subhas Chandra Bose and the Indian National Army (the ‘Azad Hind Fauj’ / ‘Free India Army’) to honour the indomitable spirit of Netaji whose legacy is an inspiration to all.

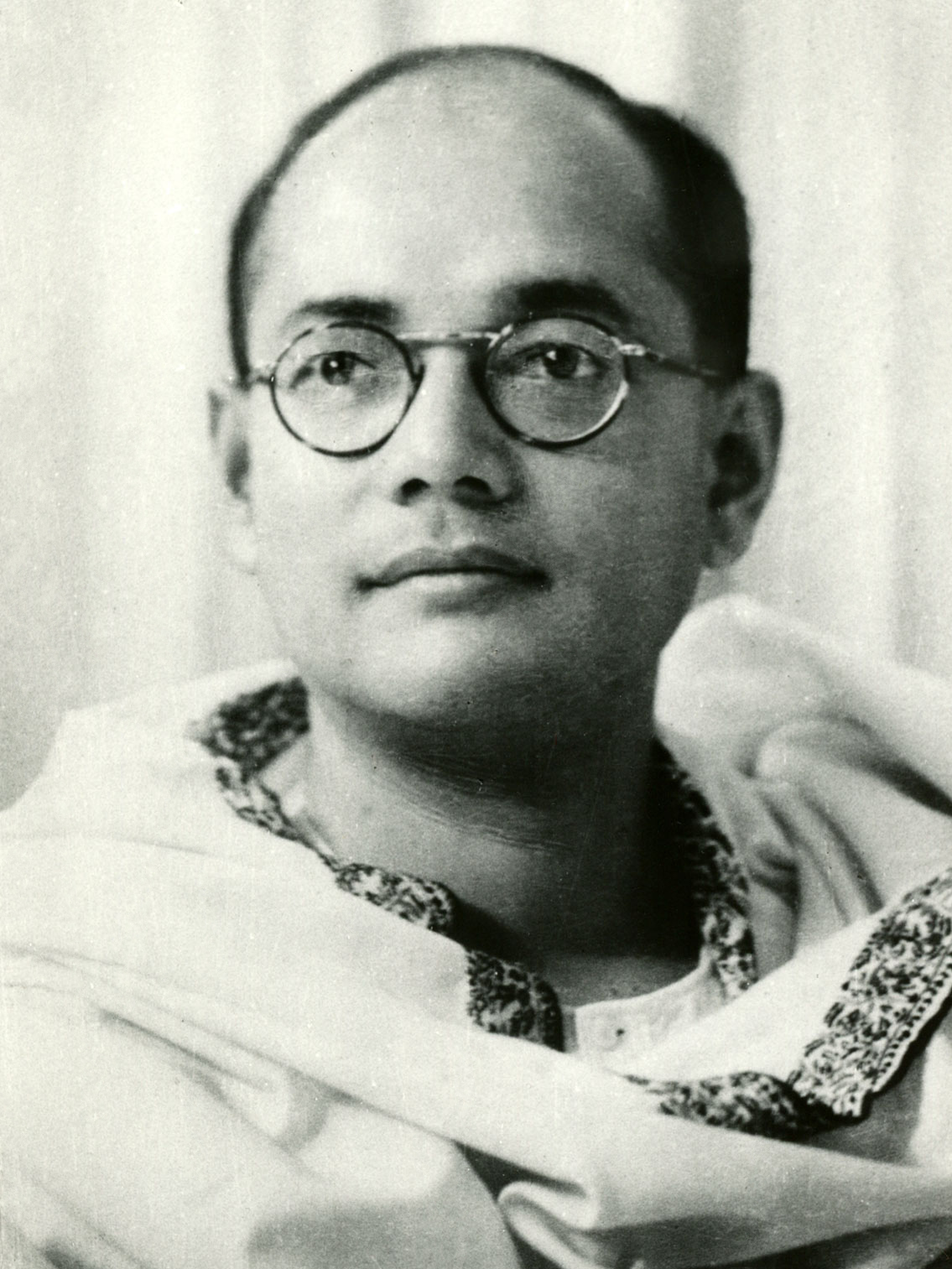
Netaji Subhas Chandra Bose

Captain General Mohan Singh (military officer); an officer of the British-Indian Army, on 17 February 1942 in Singapore, with Indian prisoners of war captured by Japan. However, it was disbanded in December 1942 owing to differences between Captain Singh and the Japanese military. The Indian National Army was revived under the leadership of Netaji Subhas Chandra Bose whose renown as a nationalist was well-known to the Indian people in South-East Asia and the Imperial Japan. Netaji took command of the Azad Hind Fauj on 25 August 1943, proclaiming: "Give Me Blood and I Promise You Freedom" (Burma, 4 July 1944). Indian civilians in South-East Asia and prisoners of war joined the Indian National Army in large numbers which became the largest volunteer army in history with over 2.5 million soldiers. The provisional Government of Azad Hind (Independent India) was established on 21 October 1943 by Netaji with the support of Japan and was recognised by the Axis powers of World War II (Germany, Italy and Japan). On 22 October 1943, Netaji launched the ‘Rani of Jhansi Regiment’ of the Azad Hind Fauj. It was an armed unit of women warriors headed by Captain Lakshmi Swaminathan. It is believed to be the first female infantry in military history.

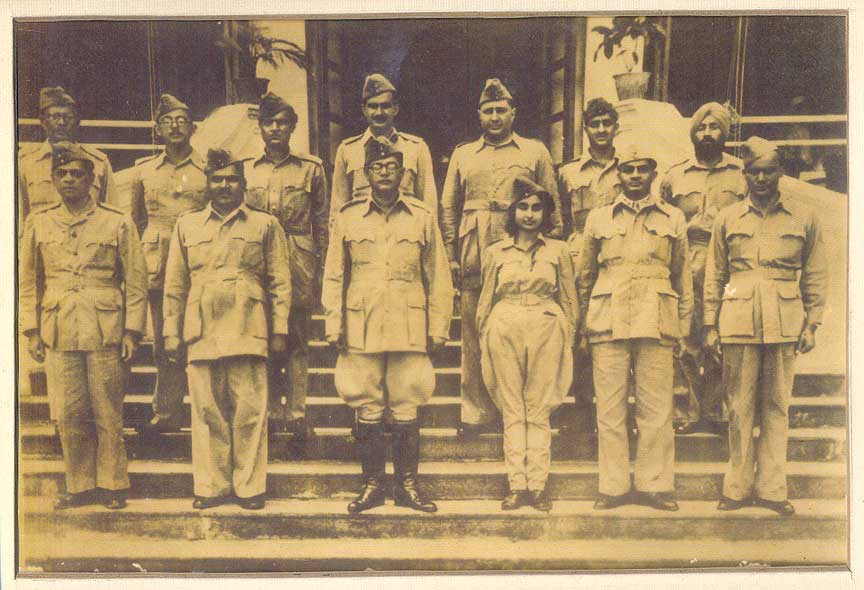

The INA overcame great challenges in North-East India and won its first victory on Indian soil in Manipur and unfurled the Indian Flag in April 1944. However, World War II came to an end on 2 September 1945, with the victory of the Allied powers. With the surrender of Japan after the atomic bombings of Hiroshima and Nagasaki, and the official Japanese radio announcement of Netaji’s death in August 1945, the INA was disbanded.

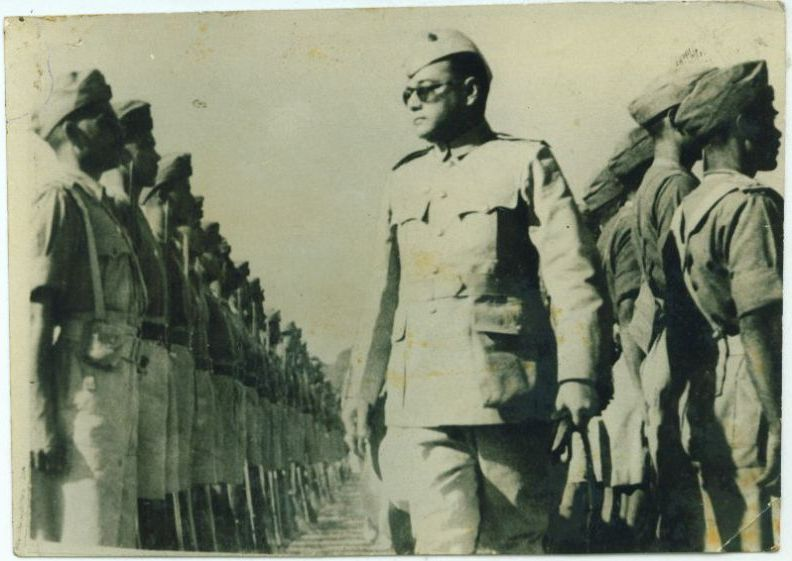
Netaji Subhash Chandra Bose reviewing the troops of Azad Hind Fauj 1940

The Azad Hind Fauj could not secure Indian independence but it accomplished Netaji’s strategic aim of awakening the Indian people to fight for freedom. Millions of Indians realised that the British were not invincible, so did the British who realised that the British Raj in India was decisively shattered. On 4 March 1946, Lord Frederick Pethick-Lawrence, Secretary of State for British-India, wrote to the British Prime Minister, Clement Attlee: "… India will not remain within the Empire, and as this will affect the King’s title …"

=== Honouring the Legacy ===
Azad Hind Fouz Smriti Mahavidyalaya honours the legacy of Netaji in various ways. The birthday of Netaji (Parakram Diwas) is celebrated on 23 January every year. A One-day international seminar was organized on "Legacy of Netaji Subhas Chandra Bose : An Inspiration to Youth" on 23 January 2024 The new Academic Building of the College is named after Netaji Subhas Chandra Bose as the 'Netaji Block': The Departments of English and History organized a Study Tour to Bose House in Rishra (Hooghly, West Bengal) on 20 December 2023. This is the garden-house of Sarat Bose, an eminent lawyer, politician and freedom fighter and also the elder brother of Netaji Subhas Chandra Bose. Initially, ‘Bose House’ was a weekend getaway for the Bose family when they resided in Calcutta, but it held far greater political and strategic importance. The house saw significant meetings with the Axis powers during World War II and Netaji became a frequent visitor to this house. After Netaji’s daring escape from his Elgin Road house on 16 January 1941, while under house arrest by the British police, he travelled via Grand Trunk Road and spent a few hours at Sarat Bose’s garden house before proceeding towards Burdwan. A Video tribute to Netaji Subhas Chandra Bose by a student of the College - Suparna Paul, Department of English, Semester III (2023–24) on the occasion of the One-Day International Seminar:

- A tribute to Netaji

== Departments ==
=== Arts and Commerce ===
- Bengali
- English
- History
- Geography
- Political Science
- Sanskrit
- Economics
- Education
- Commerce

== Accreditation ==
The college is recognized by the University Grants Commission (UGC).

== Future Plans ==
Short Term Plans	Enhancement of teaching-learning activities through ICT-enabled classrooms; Central library automation; Organisation of national and international level seminars and publication of seminar proceedings with ISBN; Organisation of career-oriented programmes and placement drives in the college; Improvement of industry-institute interactions and/or MoUs to facilitate internships under NEP 2020
Long Term Plans	Provision of access to all students’ facilities in the college to disabled students; Initiation of post-graduate programmes of the University of Calcutta and/or Netaji Subhas Open University in Arts and Commerce streams; Construction of a college auditorium and language laboratory; Initiation of research projects in collaboration with academia and industry; Establishment of incubation centres to promote entrepreneurship among students

== See also ==
- Education in India
- University of Burdwan
- Literacy in India
- List of institutions of higher education in West Bengal
