= Baruipara railway station =

Railway station in West Bengal, India

Baruipara
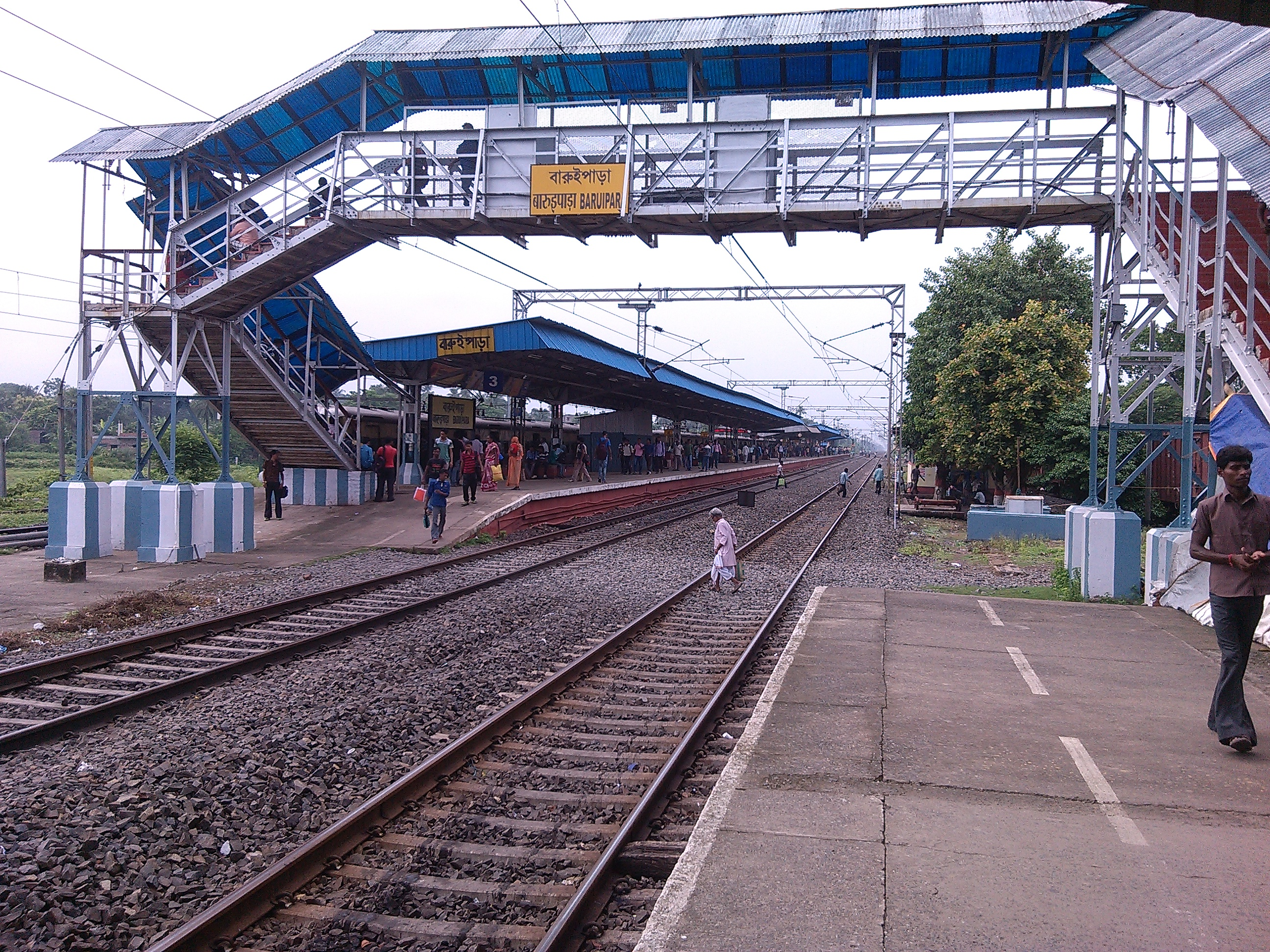

General information
- Location: Baruipara, Hooghly, West Bengal; India
- Coordinates: 22°46′01″N 88°14′13″E
- Elevation: 12 metres (39 ft)
- System: Kolkata Suburban Railway
- Owner: Indian Railways
- Operator: Eastern Railway zone
- Line: Howrah–Bardhaman chord
- Platforms: 5
- Tracks: 6

Construction
- Structure type: Standard (on-ground station)
- Parking: Yes
- Cycle facilities: Yes

Other information
- Status: Functioning
- Station code: BRPA
- Zone(s): Eastern Railway zone
- Division(s): Howrah Railway division

History
- Opened: 1917; 109 years ago
- Electrified: 1964–66
- Former names: East Indian Railway Company

Services
Preceding station	Kolkata Suburban Railway	Following station
Begampur towards Howrah Junction	Eastern Line Chord line	Mirzapur-Bankipur towards Barddhaman Junction
Route map
Location
- Location within West Bengal Location within India

Baruipara railway station is a railway station in Baruipara, a small town on the Howrah–Barddhaman chord line and is located in Hooghly district of the Indian state of West Bengal. The station is 27 kilometres (17 mi) from Howrah and is a part of the Kolkata Suburban Railway system.
