= Chanditala Assembly constituency =

Chanditala
- Constituency No. 194 for the West Bengal Legislative Assembly
- Interactive Map Outlining Chanditala Assembly Constituency

Constituency details
- Country: India
- Region: East India
- State: West Bengal
- District: Hooghly
- Lok Sabha constituency: Sreerampur
- Established: 1962
- Total electors: 201,831
- Reservation: None

Member of Legislative Assembly
- 18th West Bengal Legislative Assembly
- Incumbent Swati Khandoker
- Party: DTC
- Alliance: DTC+
- Elected year: 2026

Chanditala Assembly constituency is an assembly constituency in the Hooghly District in the Indian state of West Bengal.

== Overview ==
As per orders of the Delimitation Commission, No. 194 Chanditala Assembly constituency is composed of the following: Dankuni Municipality & Bhogabatipur, Gangadharpur, Krishnarampur, Kumirmorah and Nababpur gram panchayats of Chanditala I community development block Baksa, Barijhati, Chanditala, Garalgacha, Janai, and Naiti gram panchayats of Chanditala II community development block.

Chanditala Assembly constituency is part of No. 27 Sreerampur Lok Sabha constituency.

== Members of the Legislative Assembly ==
| Year | Name | Party |
|---|---|---|
| 1962 | Kanai Lali Dey | Indian National Congress |
| 1967 | Mohammad Abdul Latif | Independent politician |
| 1969 | Mohammad Abdul Latif | Independent politician |
| 1971 | Kaji Safiulla | Communist Party of India (Marxist) |
| 1972 | Safiulla | Indian National Congress |
| 1977 | Malin Ghosh | Communist Party of India (Marxist) |
| 1982 | Malin Ghosh | Communist Party of India (Marxist) |
| 1987 | Malin Ghosh | Communist Party of India (Marxist) |
| 1991 | Malin Ghosh | Communist Party of India (Marxist) |
| 1996 | Akbar Ali Khandoker | Indian National Congress |
| 2001 | Bhaktaram Pan | Communist Party of India (Marxist) |
| 2006 | Bhaktaram Pan | Communist Party of India (Marxist) |
| 2011 | Swati Khandoker | Trinamool Congress |
| 2016 | Swati Khandoker | Trinamool Congress |
| 2021 | Swati Khandoker | Trinamool Congress |
| 2026 | Swati Khandoker | Trinamool Congress |

== Election results ==
=== 2026 ===
2026 West Bengal Legislative Assembly election: Chanditala
| Party | Candidate | Votes | % | ±% |
|---|---|---|---|---|
| AITC | Swati Khandoker | 107,143 | 47.1 | ▼2.69 |
| BJP | Debasish Mukherjee | 87,480 | 38.46 | ▲8.63 |
| CPI(M) | Sheikh Asif Ali | 25,438 | 11.18 | ▼6.76 |
| INC | Sheikh Abu Abbasuddin | 2,458 | 1.08 | New entry |
| NOTA | None of the above | 1,451 | 0.64 | ▼0.4 |
| Majority | | 19,663 | 8.64 | ▼11.32 |
| Turnout | | 227,472 | 92.24 | ▲13.57 |
| AITC hold | | Swing | | |

=== 2021 ===
2021 West Bengal Legislative Assembly election: Chanditala
| Party | Candidate | Votes | % | ±% |
|---|---|---|---|---|
| AITC | Swati Khandoker | 103,118 | 49.79 | ▲1.51 |
| BJP | Yash Dasgupta | 61,771 | 29.83 | ▲23.08 |
| CPI(M) | Mohammed Salim | 37,161 | 17.94 | ▼22.89 |
| NOTA | None of the above | 2,156 | 1.04 | ▼0.70 |
| Majority | | 41,347 | 19.96 | ▲12.51 |
| Turnout | | 207,106 | 78.67 | ▼0.50 |
| AITC hold | | Swing | | |

=== 2016 ===
2016 West Bengal Legislative Assembly election: Chanditala
| Party | Candidate | Votes | % | ±% |
|---|---|---|---|---|
| AITC | Swati Khandoker | 91,874 | 48.28 | ▼4.18 |
| CPI(M) | Azim Ali Mohammad Sheikh | 77,698 | 40.83 | ▼1.35 |
| BJP | Sudipta Chattopadhyay | 12,843 | 6.75 | ▲3.46 |
| NOTA | None of the Above | 3,305 | 1.74 | New entry |
| SS | Raghuwansh Dwivedy | 1,970 | 1.04 | New entry |
| IUC | Moidul Islam Laskar | 1,426 | 0.75 | New entry |
| SUCI(C) | Dinabandhu Dutta | 1,184 | 0.62 | New entry |
| Majority | | 14,176 | 7.45 | ▼2.83 |
| Turnout | | 1,90,300 | 79.17 | ▼2.35 |
| AITC hold | | Swing | | |

=== 2011 ===
2011 West Bengal Legislative Assembly election: Chanditala
| Party | Candidate | Votes | % | ±% |
|---|---|---|---|---|
| AITC | Swati Khandoker | 86,394 | 52.46 | |
| CPI(M) | Azim Ali Mohammad Sheikh | 69,474 | 42.18 | |
| BJP | Sudipta Chattopadhyay | 5,413 | 3.29 | |
| PDCI | Swagata Ghosh | 3,419 | 2.08 | |
| Majority | | 16,920 | 10.28 | |
| Turnout | | 1,64,700 | 81.52 | |
| AITC gain from CPI(M) | | Swing | | |

=== 1977-2006 ===
In the 2006 and 2001 state assembly elections Bhaktaram Pan of CPI(M) won the Chanditala assembly seat defeating Swati Khandoker of Trinamool Congress in 2006 and Amit Mitra of Trinamool Congress in 2001. Contests in most years were multi cornered but only winners and runners are being mentioned. Akbar Ali Khandakar of Congress defeated Malin Ghosh of CPI(M) in 1996. Malin Ghosh of CPI(M) defeated Akbar Ali Khandakar of Congress in 1991, Ali Hossain Jamadar of Congress in 1987, Nisith Kamal of Congress in 1982 and Seikh Abdur Rahim of Congress in 1977.

=== 1962-1972 ===
Safiulla of Congress won in 1972. Kaji Safiulla of CPI(M) won in 1971. Mohammad Abdul Latif, Independent, won in 1969 and 1967. Kanai Lall Dey of Congress won in 1962.
