= Suchiya (Chhunche) =

Suchiya Chhunche
- Village
- Location in West Bengal, India Suchiya Chhunche (India)
- Coordinates: 22.7472629°N 88.1816476°E
- Country: India
- State: West Bengal
- District: Hooghly

Government
  - Body: Gram panchayat

Population (2011)
  - Total: 2,569

Languages
  - Official: Bengali, English
- Time zone: UTC+5:30 (IST)
- PIN: 712701
- ISO 3166 code: IN-WB
- Vehicle registration: WB
- Lok Sabha constituency: Serampore
- Vidhan Sabha constituency: Chanditala
- Website: wb.gov.in

Suchiya is a village in Chanditala I community development block of Srirampore subdivision in Hooghly district in the Indian state of West Bengal.

== Geography ==
Suchiya is located at 22.7472629°N 88.1816476°E.

=== Gram panchayat ===
Villages and census towns in Masat gram panchayat are: Aushbati, Azabnagar, Banamalipur, Chhunche, Krishnanagar and Masat.

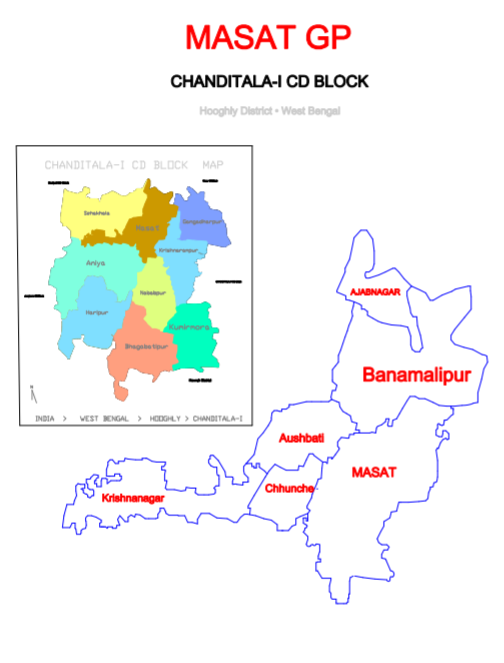
Map of Masat GP, CHANDITALA-I

== Demographics ==
As per 2011 Census of India, Chhunche had a total population of 2,569 of which 1,228 (48%) were males and 1,341 (52%) were females. Population below 6 years was 335. The total number of literates in Chhunche was 1,841 (82.41% of the population over 6 years).
