= Benipur, Hooghly =

Benipur
- Village
- Location in West Bengal, India Benipur (India)
- Coordinates: 22.7046°N 88.2496°E
- Country: India
- State: West Bengal
- District: Hooghly

Government
  - Body: Gram panchayat

Population (2011)
  - Total: 1,161

Languages
  - Official: Bengali, English
- Time zone: UTC+5:30 (IST)
- ISO 3166 code: IN-WB
- Vehicle registration: WB
- Lok Sabha constituency: Serampore
- Vidhan Sabha constituency: Chanditala
- Website: wb.gov.in

Benipur is a village in Chanditala II community development block of Srirampore subdivision in Hooghly district in the Indian state of West Bengal.

== Geography ==
Benipur is located at 22.7046°N 88.2496°E. Chanditala police station serves this Village.

=== Gram panchayat ===
Villages and census towns in Chanditala gram panchayat are: Bamandanga, Benipur, Chanditala, Kalachhara and Pairagachha.

== Demographics ==
As per 2011 Census of India, Benipur had a population of 1,161 of which 585 (50%) were males and 576 (50%) were females. Population below 6 years was 101. The number of literates in Benipur was 941 (88.77% of the population over 6 years).

== Transport ==
The nearest railway stations are Gobra railway station and Janai Road railway station on the Howrah-Bardhaman chord line, which is a part of the Kolkata Suburban Railway system.
