= Kalachhara =

- Village
- Location in West Bengal, India Kalachhara (India)
- Coordinates: 22.6984°N 88.2451°E
- Country: India
- State: West Bengal
- District: Hooghly

Government
  - Body: Gram panchayat

Population (2011)
  - Total: 4,225

Languages
  - Official: Bengali, English
- Time zone: UTC+5:30 (IST)
- ISO 3166 code: IN-WB
- Vehicle registration: WB
- Lok Sabha constituency: Serampore
- Vidhan Sabha constituency: Chanditala
- Website: wb.gov.in

Kalachhara is a village in Chanditala II community development block of Srirampore subdivision in Hooghly district in the Indian state of West Bengal.

== Geography ==
Kalachhara is located at 22.6984°N 88.2451°E. Chanditala police station serves this Village.

=== Gram panchayat ===
Villages and census towns in Chanditala gram panchayat are: Bamandanga, Benipur, Chanditala, Kalachhara and Pairagachha.

== Demographics ==
As per 2011 Census of India, Kalachhara had a population of 4,225 of which 2,134 (51%) were males and 2,091 (49%) females. Population below 6 years was 385. The total number of literates in Kalachhara was 3,373 (87.84% of the population over 6 years).

== Transport ==
=== Railway and road ===
Janai Road railway station is the nearest railway station on the Howrah-Bardhaman chord of Kolkata Suburban Railway network. The main road is SH 15 (Ahilyabai Holkar Road). It is the main road of the village and is connected to NH 19 (old number NH 2).

=== Bus ===
==== Private Bus ====
- 26 Bonhooghly - Champadanga
- 26A Serampore - Aushbati
- 26C Bonhooghly - Jagatballavpur

==== Bus Routes without Numbers ====
- Howrah Station - Bandar (Dhanyaghori)
- Dakshineswar - Bhagabatipur
