= Malipukur =

- Village
- Location in West Bengal, India Malipukur (India)
- Coordinates: 22.7618937°N 88.2134692°E
- Arambagh: ArambaghIndia
- State: West Bengal
- District: Hooghly

Government
  - Type: Panchayati raj (India)
  - Body: Mayapur 1 No panchayat

Population (2011)
  - Total: 945

Languages
  - Official: Bengali, English
- Time zone: UTC+5:30 (IST)
- Telephone code: 712413
- ISO 3166 code: IN-WB
- Vehicle registration: WB
- Lok Sabha constituency: Serampore
- Vidhan Sabha constituency: Chanditala
- Website: wb.gov.in

Malipukur is a Village in Arambagh community development block in Arambagh subdivision of Hooghly district in the state of West Bengal, India. It is served by the Arambagh police station.

== Geography ==
Malipukur is located at 22.7618937°N 88.2134692°E.

Map of Gangadharpur GP showing Mouzas

=== Gram panchayat ===
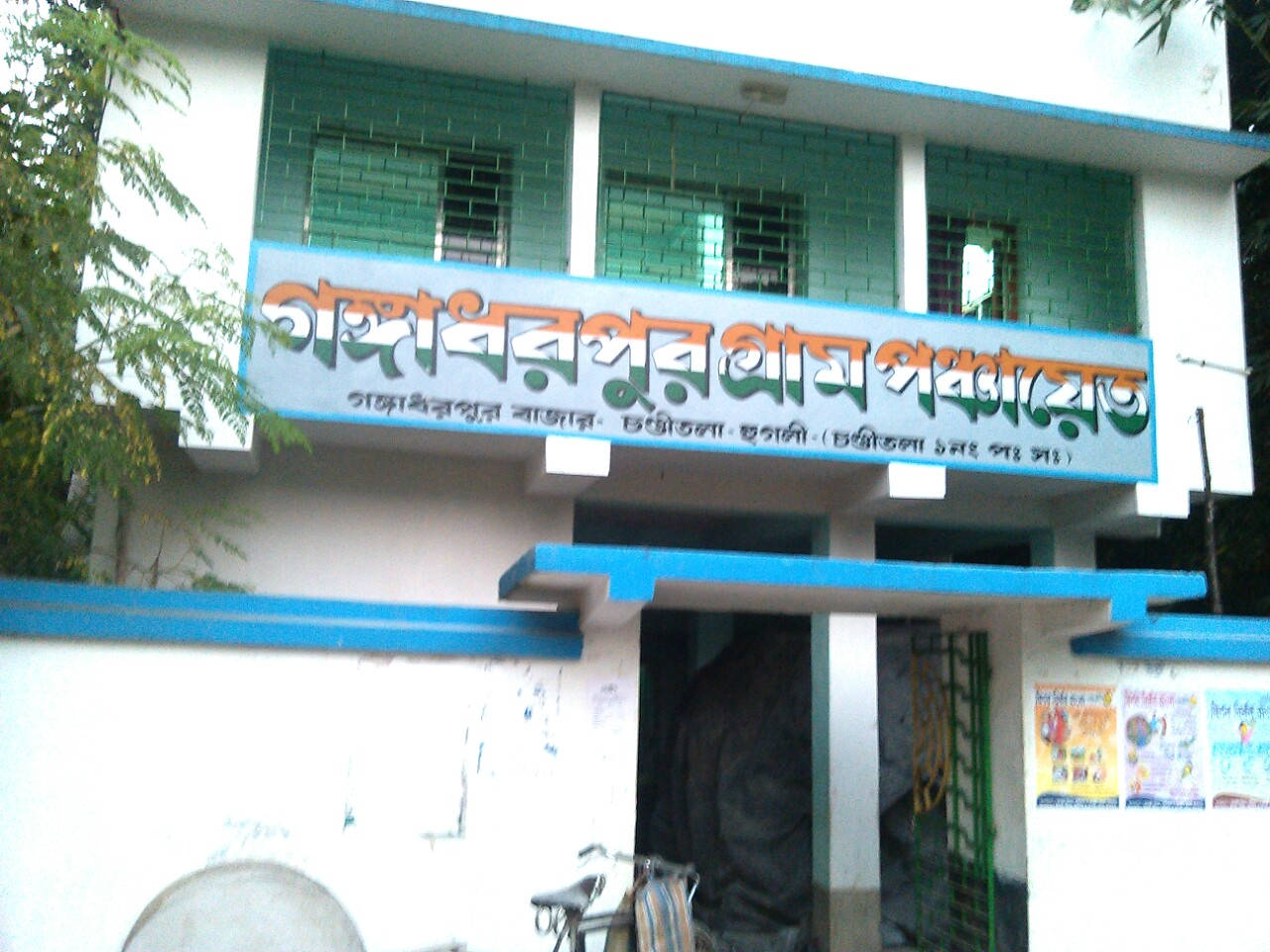
Gangadharpur Gram panchayat

Villages and census towns in Gangadharpur gram panchayat are: Bankrishnapur, Gangadharpur, Malipukur and Manirampur.

Market: Ganngadharpur Bazar, Hajaghata, Manirampur.

== Demographics ==
As per 2011 Census of India, Malipukur had a total population of 945 of which 498 (53%) were males and 447 (47%) were females. Population below 6 years was 100. The total number of literates in Malipukur was 658 (77.87% of the population over 6 years).

== Transport ==
The nearest railway station is Baruipara railway station on the Howrah-Bardhaman chord which is a part of the Kolkata Suburban Railway system.

The main road is 31 Number Road It is the main artery of the town and it is connected to NH2 19 (old number NH 2)/ Durgapur Expressway and Grand Trunk Road.

There is 31 number bus service from Jangipara bus stand to Serampore bus stand via Sehakhala, Banmalipur, Gangadharpur, Baruipara, Bora.

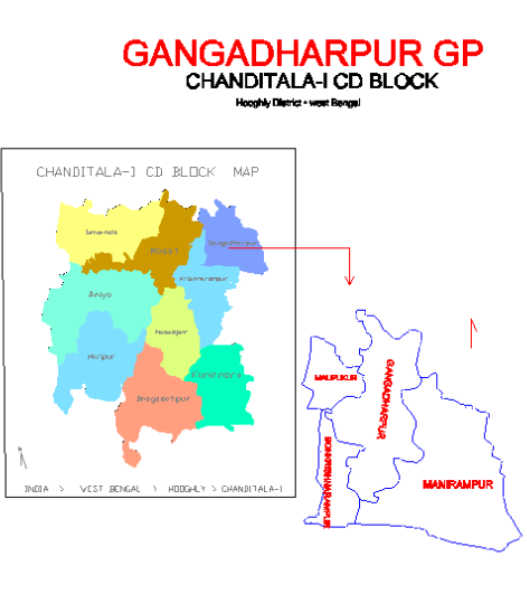
Map of Gangadharpur GP
