= Danpatipur =

- Village
- Location in West Bengal, India Danpatipur (India)
- Coordinates: 22.7153°N 88.2729°E
- Country: India
- State: West Bengal
- District: Hooghly

Government
  - Body: Gram panchayat

Population (2011)
  - Total: 3,984

Languages
  - Official: Bengali, English
- Time zone: UTC+5:30 (IST)
- ISO 3166 code: IN-WB
- Vehicle registration: WB
- Lok Sabha constituency: Serampore
- Vidhan Sabha constituency: Chanditala
- Website: wb.gov.in

Danpatipur is a village in Chanditala II community development block of Srirampore subdivision in Hooghly district in the Indian state of West Bengal.

== Geography ==
Danpatipur is located at 22.7153°N 88.2729°E. Chanditala police station serves this village.

=== Gram panchayat ===
Villages and census towns in Naiti gram panchayat are: Adan, Bankagachha, Chikrand, Danpatipur and Naiti.

== Demographics ==
As per 2011 Census of India, Danpatipur had a population of 1,768 of which 866 (49%) were males and 902 (51%) were females. Population below 6 years was 213. The total number of literates in Bankagachha was 1,134 (72.93% of the population over 6 years).

== Transport ==
The nearest railway station is Janai Road railway station on the Howrah-Bardhaman chord line which is a part of the Kolkata Suburban Railway system.

Danpatipur is off NH-19 (old number NH 2) / Durgapur Expressway.
