= Bankagachha =

- Village
- Location in West Bengal, India Bankagachha (India)
- Coordinates: 22.7228°N 88.2574°E
- Country: India
- State: West Bengal
- District: Hooghly

Government
  - Body: Gram panchayat

Population (2011)
  - Total: 2,743

Languages
  - Official: Bengali, English
- Time zone: UTC+5:30 (IST)
- ISO 3166 code: IN-WB
- Vehicle registration: WB
- Lok Sabha constituency: Serampore
- Vidhan Sabha constituency: Chanditala
- Website: wb.gov.in

Bankagachha is a village in Chanditala II community development block of Srirampore subdivision in Hooghly district in the Indian state of West Bengal.

== Geography ==
Bankagachha is located at 22.7228°N 88.2574°E. Chanditala police station serves this Village.

=== Gram panchayat ===
Villages and census towns in Naiti gram panchayat are: Adan, Bankagachha, Chikrand, Danpatipur and Naiti.

== Demographics ==
As per 2011 Census of India, Bankagachha had a population of 2,424, of which 1,286 (52%) were males and 1,156 (48%) females. Population below 6 years was 206. The total number of literates in Bankagachha was 2,044 (92.16% of the population over 6 years).

== Transport ==
The nearest railway station is Janai Road railway station on the Howrah-Bardhaman chord line which is a part of the Kolkata Suburban Railway system.
