= Thero, Hooghly =

Thero
- Village
- Location in West Bengal, India Thero (India)
- Coordinates: 22.6792°N 88.2505°E
- Country: India
- State: West Bengal
- District: Hooghly

Government
  - Body: Gram panchayat

Population (2011)
  - Total: 3,051

Languages
  - Official: Bengali, English
- Time zone: UTC+5:30 (IST)
- ISO 3166 code: IN-WB
- Vehicle registration: WB
- Lok Sabha constituency: Serampore
- Vidhan Sabha constituency: Chanditala
- Website: wb.gov.in

Thero is a village in Chanditala II community development block of Srirampore subdivision in Hooghly district in the Indian state of West Bengal.

== Geography ==
Thero is located at 22°40′45″N 88°15′02″E. Chanditala police station serves this Village.

=== Gram panchayat ===
Villages and census towns in Barijhati gram panchayat are: Barijhati, Beledanga, Gokulpur, Khanpur, Makhalpara and Thero.

== Demographics ==
As per 2011 Census of India, Thero had a population of 3,051 of which 1,579 (52%) were males and 1,472 (48%) were females. Population below 6 years was 264. The total number of literates in Thero was 2,129 (76.39% of the population over 6 years).

== Transport ==
The nearest railway station is Gobra on the Howrah-Bardhaman chord line and is part of the Kolkata Suburban Railway system.
