= Madhabpur =

- Village
- Location in West Bengal, India Madhabpur (India)
- Coordinates: 22.7312°N 88.2384°E
- Country: India
- State: West Bengal
- District: Hooghly

Government
  - Body: Gram panchayat

Population (2011)
  - Total: 3,982

Languages
  - Official: Bengali, English
- Time zone: UTC+5:30 (IST)
- ISO 3166 code: IN-WB
- Vehicle registration: WB
- Lok Sabha constituency: Serampore
- Vidhan Sabha constituency: Chanditala
- Website: wb.gov.in

Madhabpur is a village in Chanditala II community development block of Srirampore subdivision in Hooghly district in the Indian state of West Bengal.

== Geography ==
Madhabpur is located at 22.7312°N 88.2384°E. Chanditala police station serves this Village.

=== Gram panchayat ===
Villages and census towns in Baksa gram panchayat are: Baksa, Duttapur, Khoragari and Madhabpur.

== Demographics ==
As per 2011 Census of India, Madhabpur had a population of 3,982 of which 2,009 (50%) were males and 1,973 (50%) females. Population below 6 years was 403. The number of literates in Madhabpur was 2,880 (80.47% of the population over 6 years).

== Transport ==
The nearest railway stations, Begampur railway station and Janai Road railway station, are on the Howrah-Bardhaman chord line, which is a part of the Kolkata Suburban Railway system.
