= Chanditala =

- Village
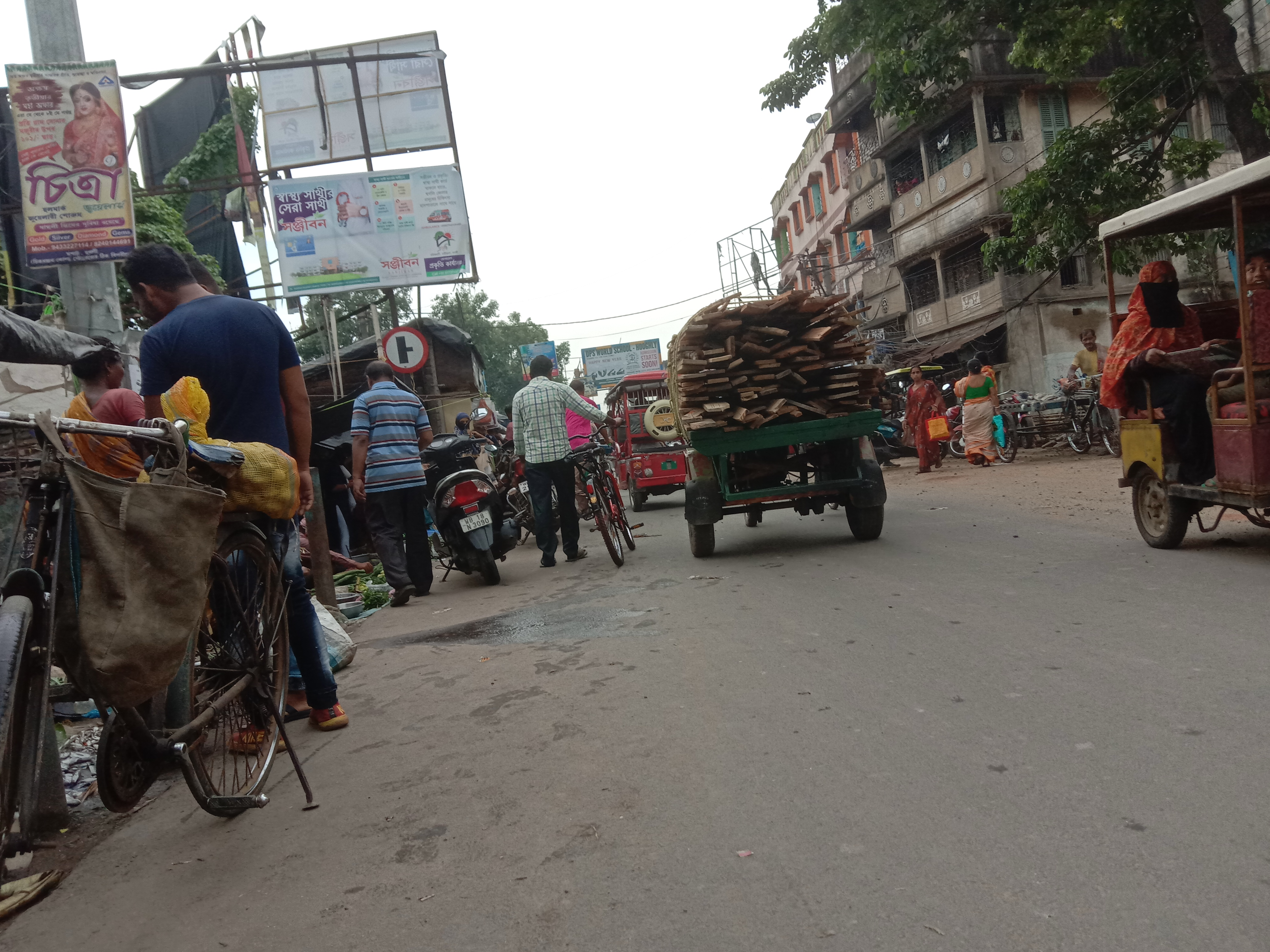
- Chanditala bazaar

- Location in West Bengal, India Chanditala (India)
- Coordinates: 22.6909°N 88.2662°E
- Country: India
- State: West Bengal
- District: Hooghly
- Nearest City: Serampore
- Named for: From the Temple of Maa Chandi

Government
  - Type: Gram panchayat
  - Body: Barijahatty Gram Panchayet

Area
  - Total: 93.45 km^{2} (36.08 sq mi)

Population (2011)
  - Total: 3,984
  - Density: 42.63/km^{2} (110.4/sq mi)
- Demonym: Chanditalian

Languages
  - Official: Bengali, English
- Time zone: UTC+5:30 (IST)
- Postal code: 712702
- Telephone code: 03212
- ISO 3166 code: IN-WB
- Vehicle registration: WB
- Lok Sabha constituency: Serampore
- Vidhan Sabha constituency: Chanditala
- Website: wb.gov.in

Chanditala is a village in Chanditala II community development block of Srirampore subdivision in Hooghly District in the Indian state of West Bengal.

== Demographics ==
As per the 2011 Census of India, Chanditala had a population of 3,984 of which 2,059 (52%) were males and 1,925 (48%) females. Population below 6 years was 335. The total number of literates in Chanditala was 3,119 (85.48% of the population over 6 years).

== Geography ==
Cities and towns in Chanditala I, Chanditala II and Jangipara CD Blocks in Srirampore subdivision in Hooghly district
M: municipal city/ town, CT: census town, R: rural/ urban centre,
Owing to space constraints in the small map, the actual locations in a larger map may vary slightly

=== Location ===
Chanditala is located at 22°41′27″N 88°15′58″E.

=== Police station ===
Chanditala police station has jurisdiction over the Chanditala I CD Block and a part of Chanditala II CD Block.

=== CD Block HQ ===
The headquarters of Chanditala II CD Block are located at Chanditala.

=== Urbanisation ===
Srirampore subdivision is the most urbanized of the subdivisions in Hooghly district. 73.13% of the population in the subdivision is urban and 26.88% is rural. The subdivision has 6 municipalities and 34 census towns. The municipalities are: Uttarpara Kotrung Municipality, Konnagar Municipality, Serampore Municipality, Baidyabati Municipality, Rishra Municipality and Dankuni Municipality. Amongst the CD Blocks in the subdivision, Uttarapara Serampore (census towns shown in a separate map) had 76% urban population, Chanditala I 42%, Chanditala II 69% and Jangipara 7% (census towns shown in the map above). All places marked in the map are linked in the larger full screen map.

=== Gram panchayat ===
Villages and census towns in Chanditala gram panchayat are: Bamandanga, Benipur, Chanditala, Kalachhara and Pairagachha.

== Healthcare ==
Chanditala Rural Hospital (60 bedded public hospital). Medisky Hospital & Diagnostic (110 bedded private hospital).

== Transport ==
- Railway

The nearest railway station is Gobra railway station on Howrah-Bardhaman chord of Kolkata Suburban Railway network. Had a Railway Station from 1915 to 1971 under Narrow Gauge Railway. Railway Station Board can be still seen beside SH 15 as the highway follows the same path & route of the erstwhile Martin's Light Railways Sheakhala line.

- Road

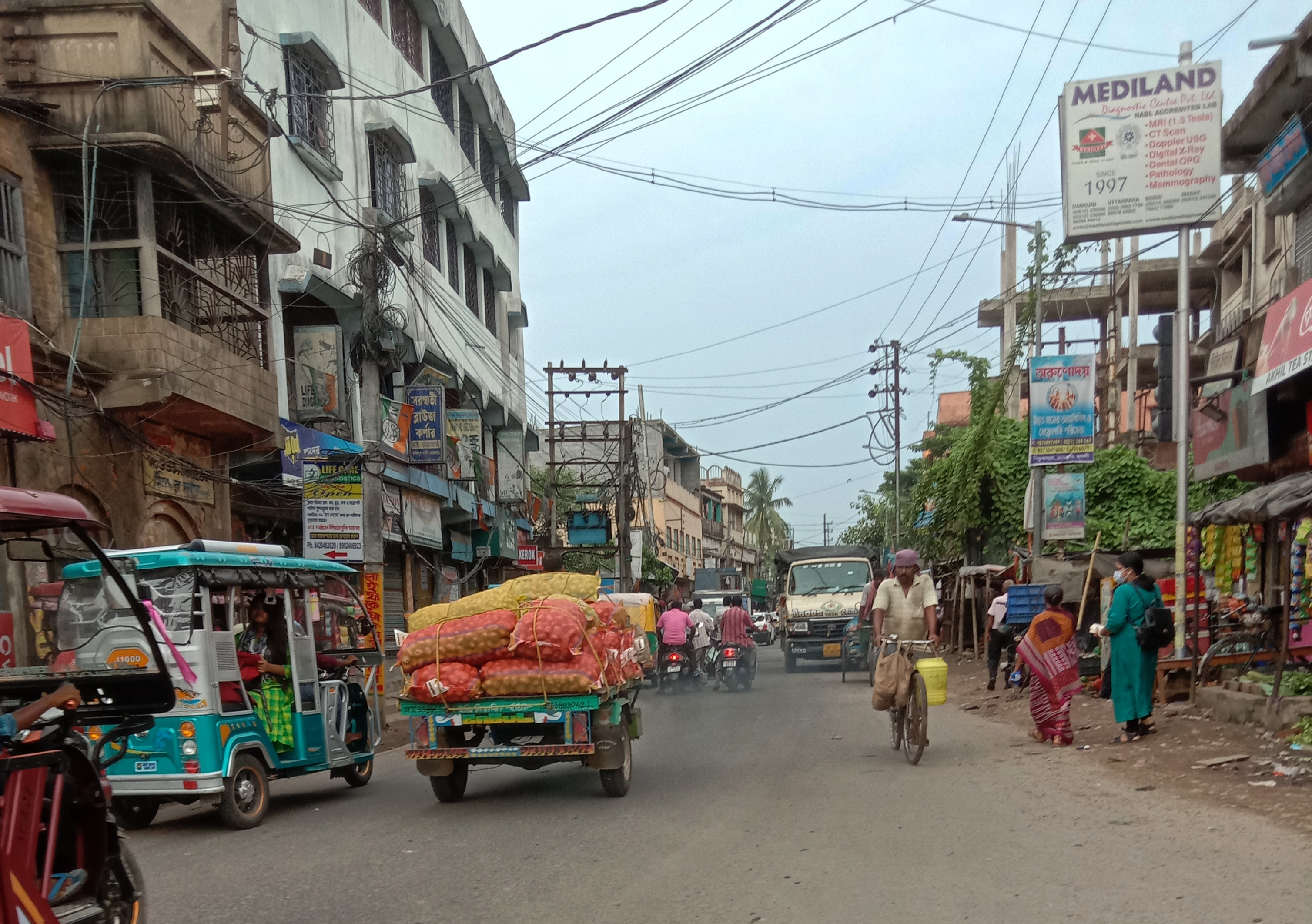
Ahilyabai Holkar Road in Kalipur, near Chanditala.

The main road is SH 15 (Ahilyabai Holkar Road). It is the main artery of the village and it is connected to NH 19 (old number NH 2).

- Bus

=== Private Bus ===
- 26 Bonhooghly - Champadanga
- 26A Serampore - Aushbati
- 26C Bonhooghly - Jagatballavpur
- 57A Howrah Station - Chanditala
- E36 Esplanade - Champadanga
- 26B Howrah Station - Bandar (Dhanyaghori)
- 26/1 Dakshineswar - Bhagabatipur
- 4/41 Chinsurah - Chanditala
- Express Buses Esplanade - Bardhaman
- Esplanade - Bankura
