= Duttapur =

- Village
- Location in West Bengal, India Duttapur (India)
- Coordinates: 22.7247°N 88.2269°E
- Country: India
- State: West Bengal
- District: Hooghly

Government
  - Body: Gram panchayat

Population (2011)
  - Total: 2,285

Languages
  - Official: Bengali, English
- Time zone: UTC+5:30 (IST)
- ISO 3166 code: IN-WB
- Vehicle registration: WB
- Lok Sabha constituency: Serampore
- Vidhan Sabha constituency: Chanditala
- Website: wb.gov.in

Duttapur is a village in Chanditala II community development block of Srirampore subdivision in Hooghly district in the Indian state of West Bengal.

== Geography ==
Duttapur is located at 22°43′29″N 88°13′37″E. It is located in the Chanditall–II community development block under the Srirampore subdivision of the Hooghly district. Chanditala police station serves this Village.

=== Gram panchayat ===
Villages and census towns in Baksa gram panchayat are: Baksa, Duttapur, Khoragari and Madhabpur.

== Demographics ==
As per 2011 Census of India, Duttapur had a population of 2,285, of which 1,165 (51%) were males and 1,120 (49%) females. Population below 6 years was 207. The total number of literates in Duttapur was 1,757 (84.55% of the population over 6 years).

== Transport ==
The nearest railway station, Janai Road railway station, is on the Howrah-Bardhaman chord line which is a part of the Kolkata Suburban Railway system.

The main road is State Highway 15. It is the main artery of the town and it is connected to NH-19 (old number NH 2)/ Durgapur Expressway.
