= Khoragari =

- Village
- Location in West Bengal, India Khoragari (India)
- Coordinates: 22.7227°N 88.2316°E
- Country: India
- State: West Bengal
- District: Hooghly

Government
  - Body: Gram panchayat

Population (2011)
  - Total: 1,827

Languages
  - Official: Bengali, English
- Time zone: UTC+5:30 (IST)
- ISO 3166 code: IN-WB
- Vehicle registration: WB
- Lok Sabha constituency: Serampore
- Vidhan Sabha constituency: Chanditala
- Website: wb.gov.in

Khoragari is a village in Chanditala II community development block of Srirampore subdivision in Hooghly district in the Indian state of West Bengal.

== Geography ==
Khoragari is located at 22.7227°N 88.2316°E. Chanditala police station serves this Village.

=== Gram panchayat ===
Villages and census towns in Baksa gram panchayat are: Baksa, Duttapur, Khoragari and Madhabpur.

== Demographics ==
As per 2011 Census of India, Khoragari had a total population of 1,827 of which 898 (49%) were males and 929 (51%) were females. Population below 6 years was 199. The total number of literates in Khoragari was 1,311 (80.53% of the population over 6 years).

== Transport ==
The nearest railway station is Janai Road railway station on the Howrah-Bardhaman chord line, which is a part of the Kolkata Suburban Railway system.

The main road is State Highway 15. It is the main artery of the town and is connected to NH-19 (old number NH 2)/ Durgapur Expressway.
