= Bamandanga =

- Village
- Location in West Bengal, India Bamandanga (India)
- Coordinates: 22.6878°N 88.2430°E
- Country: India
- State: West Bengal
- District: Hooghly

Government
  - Body: Gram panchayat

Population (2011)
  - Total: 2,743

Languages
  - Official: Bengali, English
- Time zone: UTC+5:30 (IST)
- ISO 3166 code: IN-WB
- Vehicle registration: WB
- Lok Sabha constituency: Serampore
- Vidhan Sabha constituency: Chanditala
- Website: wb.gov.in

Bamandanga is a village in Chanditala II community development block of Srirampore subdivision in Hooghly district in the Indian state of West Bengal.

== Geography ==
Bamandanga is located at 22.6878°N 88.2430°E.

=== Gram panchayat ===
Villages and census towns in Chanditala gram panchayat are: Bamandanga, Benipur, Chanditala, Kalachhara and Pairagachha.

== Demographics ==
As per 2011 Census of India, Bamandanga had a population of 2,743, of which 1,420 (52%) were males and 1,323 (48%) females. Population below 6 years was 220. The total number of literates in Bamandanga was 2,123 (84.15% of the population over 6 years).

== Transport ==
The nearest railway station is Gobra railway station on the Howrah-Bardhaman chord line which is part of the Kolkata Suburban Railway system.
