= Adan, Hooghly =

Adan
- Village
- Location in West Bengal, India Adan (India)
- Coordinates: 22.7276°N 88.2543°E
- Country: India
- State: West Bengal
- District: Hooghly

Government
  - Body: Gram panchayat

Population (2011)
  - Total: 3,785

Languages
  - Official: Bengali, English
- Time zone: UTC+5:30 (IST)
- PIN: 712304
- ISO 3166 code: IN-WB
- Vehicle registration: WB
- Lok Sabha constituency: Serampore
- Vidhan Sabha constituency: Chanditala
- Website: wb.gov.in

Adan is a village in Chanditala II community development block of Srirampore subdivision in Hooghly district in the Indian state of West Bengal.

== Geography ==
Adan is located at 22.7276°N 88.2543°E. Chanditala police station serves this village.

=== Gram panchayat ===
Villages and census towns in Naiti gram panchayat are: Adan, Bankagachha, Chikrand, Danpatipur and Naiti.

== Demographics ==
As per 2011 census of India, Adan had a population of 3,785 of which 1,901 (50%) were males and 1,484 (50%) were females. Population below 6 years was 291. The total number of literates in Adan was 3,092 (88.49% of the population over 6 years).

== Transport ==
The nearest railway stations are Janai Road railway station and at Begampur on the Howrah-Bardhaman chord line which is a part of the Kolkata Suburban Railway system.
