= Gangadharpur Gram Panchayat =

Gangadharpur Gram panchayat
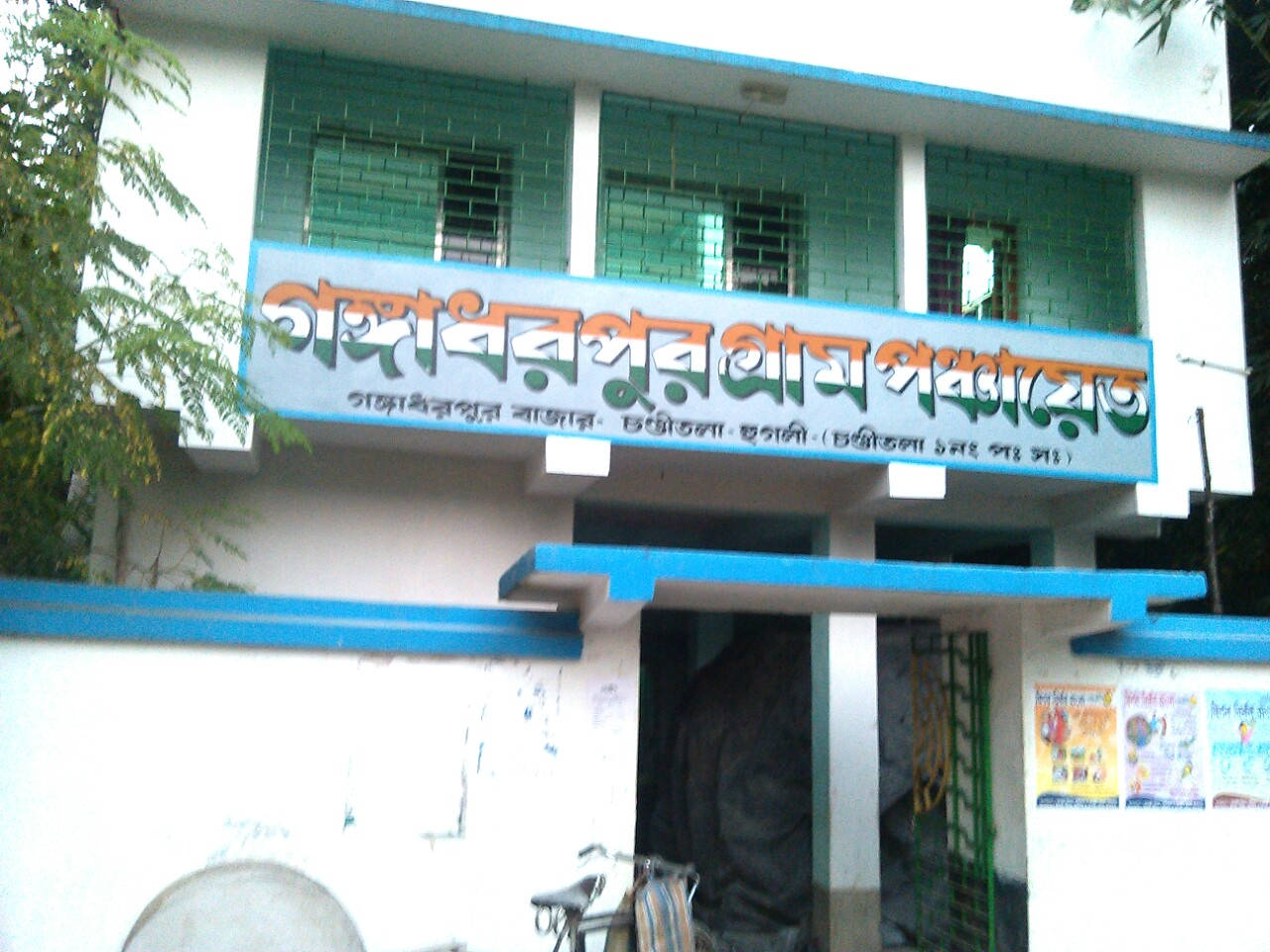
- Type: Gram panchayat
- Headquarters: Gangadharpur
- Official language: Bengali, English
- Sarpanch: Kaberi Das
- Website: Gangadharpur_GP

Gangadharpur Gram panchayat is the local self-government of the village. The panchayat is divided into wards and each ward is represented by an elected ward member. The ward members are headed by a Sarpanch. Gangadharpur Gram panchayat areas in Chanditala I CD Block in Srirampore subdivision of Hooghly district in the state of West Bengal, India .

Map of Gangadharpur gram panchayat

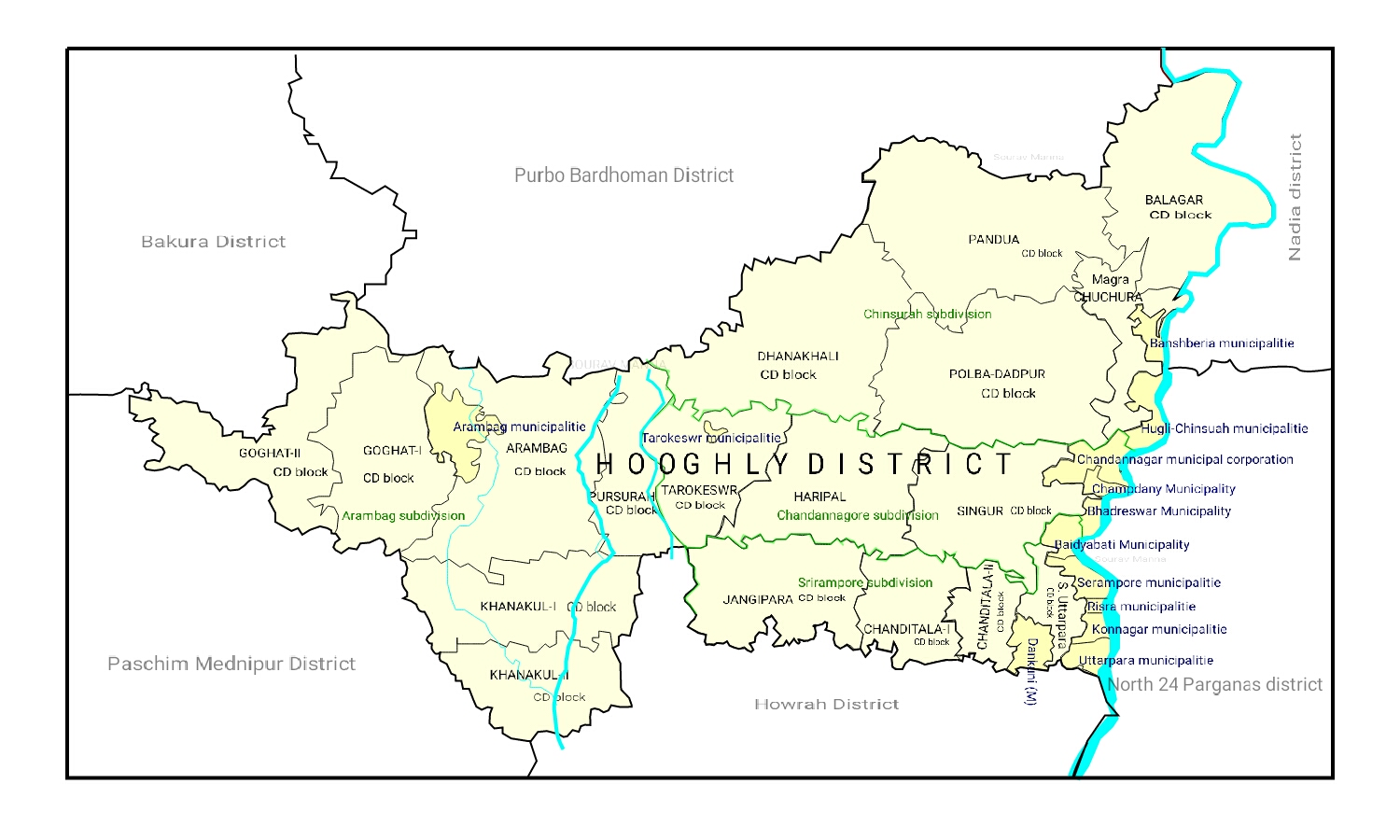
Map of Hooghly district showing CD blocks and municipal areas

Map of Chanditala-I CD block sowing GP

== Geography ==
Gangadharpur gram panchayat located at the Chanditala I CD block . Villages and census towns in Gangadharpur gram panchayat are: Bankrishnapur, Gangadharpur(CT), Malipukur and Manirampur(CT).

== Healthcare ==
Gangdharpur has a Primary Health Centre with 10 beds.
