= Beledanga =

- Village
- Location in West Bengal, India Beledanga (India)
- Coordinates: 22.6952°N 88.2719°E
- Country: India
- State: West Bengal
- District: Hooghly

Government
  - Body: Gram panchayat

Population (2011)
  - Total: 3,777

Languages
  - Official: Bengali, English
- Time zone: UTC+5:30 (IST)
- ISO 3166 code: IN-WB
- Vehicle registration: WB
- Lok Sabha constituency: Serampore
- Vidhan Sabha constituency: Chanditala
- Website: wb.gov.in

Beledanga is a village in Chanditala II community development block of Srirampore subdivision in Hooghly district in the Indian state of West Bengal.

== Geography ==
Beledanga is located at 22.6952°N 88.2719°E. Chanditala police station serves this Village.

=== Gram panchayat ===
Villages and census towns in Barijhati gram panchayat are: Barijhati, Beledanga, Gokulpur, Khanpur, Makhalpara and Thero.

== Demographics ==
As per 2011 Census of India, Beledanga had a population of 3,777 of which 1,936 (51%) were males and 1,841 (49%) females. Population below 6 years was 363. The total number of literates in Beledanga was 2,937 (86.03% of the population over 6 years).

== Transport ==
The nearest railway station is at Gobra on the Howrah-Bardhaman chord line which is a part of the Kolkata Suburban Railway system.
