= Eklakhi =

Eklakhi may refer to:

- Eklakhi, Hooghly, a village in Hooghly district, West Bengal, India
- Eklakhi Junction railway station, Maldah district, West Bengal, India
