= Bankrishnapur =

- Village
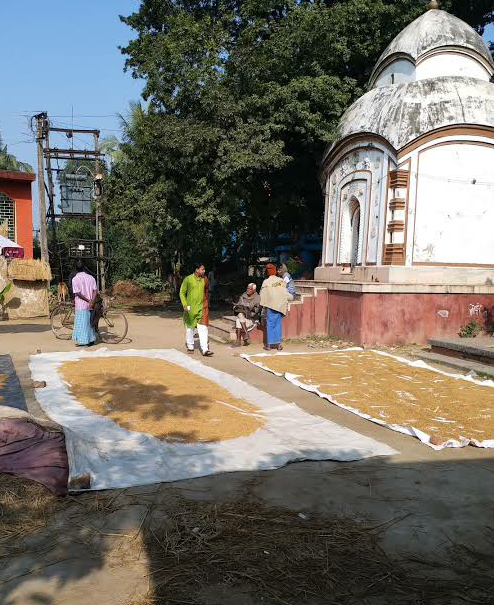
- Bonkrishnapur Shivtala

- Location in West Bengal, India Bankrishnapur (India)
- Coordinates: 22.7427691°N 88.2138111°E
- Country: India
- State: West Bengal
- District: Hooghly

Government
  - Type: Panchayati raj (India)
  - Body: Gangadharpur gram panchayat

Population (2011)
  - Total: 1,610

Languages
  - Official: Bengali, English
- Time zone: UTC+5:30 (IST)
- ISO 3166 code: IN-WB
- Vehicle registration: WB
- Lok Sabha constituency: Serampore
- Vidhan Sabha constituency: Chanditala
- Website: wb.gov.in

Bankrishnapur is a village in Chanditala I community development block of Srirampore subdivision in Hooghly district in the Indian state of West Bengal.

== Geography ==
Bankrishnapur is located at 22.7427691°N 88.2138111°E.

Map of Gangadharpur GP showing Mouzas

=== Gram panchayat ===
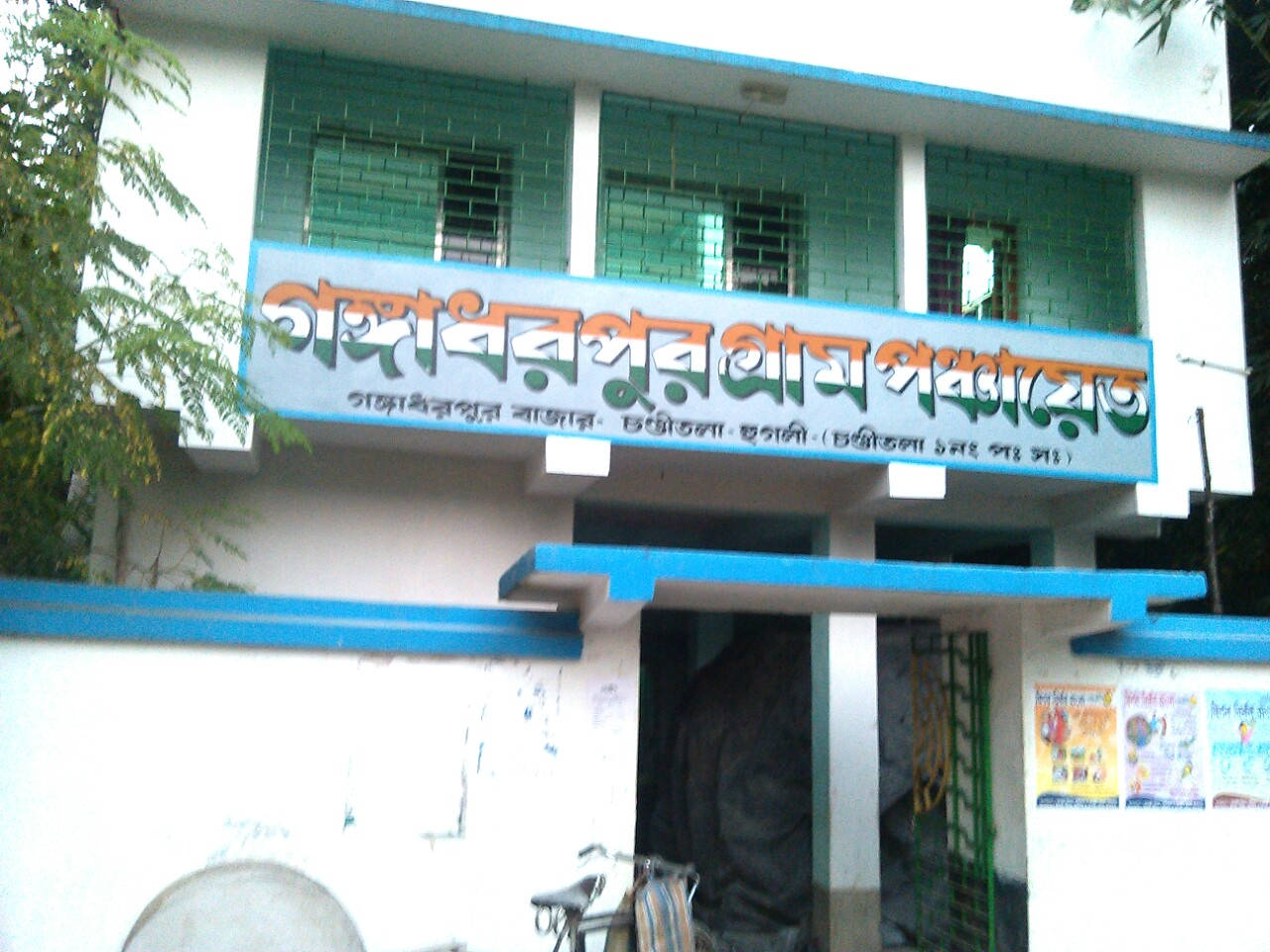
Gangadharpur Gram panchayat

Villages and census towns in Gangadharpur gram panchayat are: Bankrishnapur, Gangadharpur, Malipukur and Manirampur.

Market: Ganngadharpur Bazar, Hajaghata, Manirampur.

== Demographics ==
As per 2011 Census of India, Bankrishnapur had a total population of 1,610, of which 867 (54%) were males and 743 (46%) females. Population below 6 years was 176. The total number of literates in Bankrishnapur was 1,226 (85.50% of the population over 6 years).

== Transport ==
The nearest railway station is Baruipara railway station on the Howrah-Bardhaman chord line, which is a part of the Kolkata Suburban Railway system.

The main road is Gangadharpur-Jangalpara Road; it is connected to State Highway 15. There is auto and trecker service from Baruipara to Masat via Gangadharpur, Bankrishnapur.

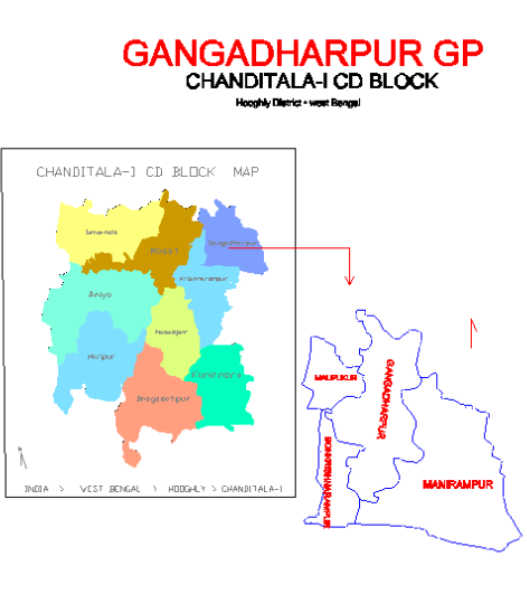
Map of Gangadharpur GP
