= Chanditala II =

- Community development block
- Coordinates: 22.6921810°N 88.2597730°E
- Country: India
- State: West Bengal
- District: Hooghly
- Nearest City: Serampore

Government
  - Type: Community development block

Area
  - Total: 70.34 km^{2} (27.16 sq mi)
- Elevation: 6 m (20 ft)

Population (2011)
  - Total: 158,396
  - Density: 2,252/km^{2} (5,832/sq mi)

Languages
  - Official: Bengali, English
- Time zone: UTC+5:30 (IST)
- PIN: 712702 (Chanditala); 712304 (Janai); 712311 (Dankuni); 712306 (Begampur)
- Telephone/STD code: 03214
- ISO 3166 code: IN-WB
- Vehicle registration: WB 15, WB 16, WB 18
- Literacy: 84.78%
- Lok Sabha constituency: Sreerampur, Hooghly
- Vidhan Sabha constituency: Chanditala, Singur
- Website: hooghly.gov.in

Chanditala II is a community development block that forms an administrative division in Srirampore subdivision of Hooghly district in the Indian state of West Bengal.

== Overview ==
The Chanditala II CD Block is part of the Hooghly-Damodar Plain, one of the three natural regions in the district of the flat alluvial plains, that form a part of the Gangetic Delta. The region has many depressions which receive water from the surrounding lands during the rainy season and discharge the water through small channels.

== Geography ==
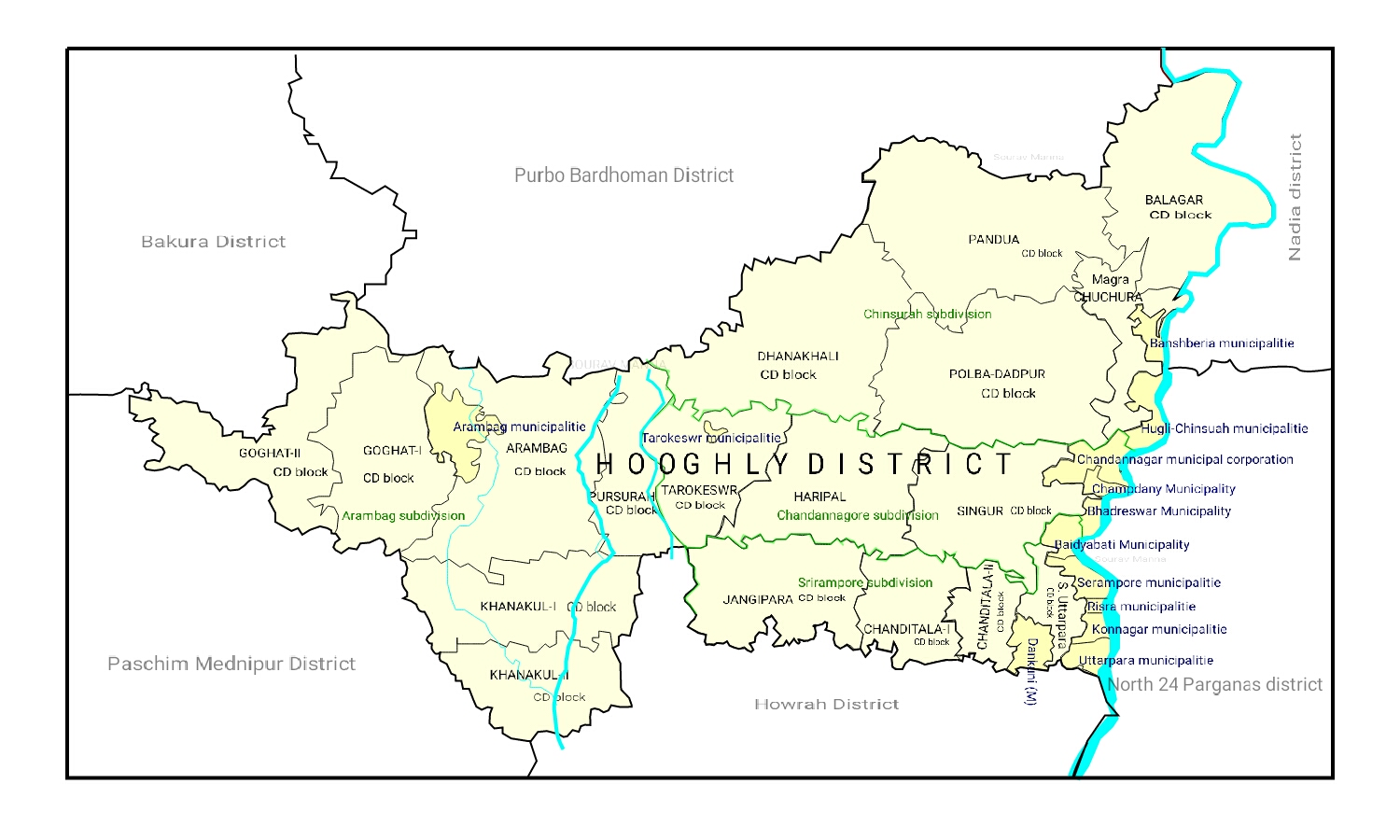
Map of Hooghly district showing CD blocks and municipal areas

Chanditala is located at 22°41′32″N 88°15′35″E.

Chanditala II CD Block is bounded by Singur CD Block in the north, Sreerampur Uttarpara CD Block in the east, Domjur CD Block, in Howrah district, in the south and Chanditala I CD Block in the west. Dankuni Municipality is in the south-eastern part of the CD Block. It is located 31 km from Chinsurah, the district headquarters.

Chanditala II CD Block (including Dankuni municipality) has an area of 70.34 km^{2}. It has 1 panchayat samity, 9 gram panchayats, 132 gram sansads (village councils), 36 mouzas and 20 inhabited villages. Chanditala and Dankuni police stations serve this block. Headquarters of this CD Block is at Chanditala.

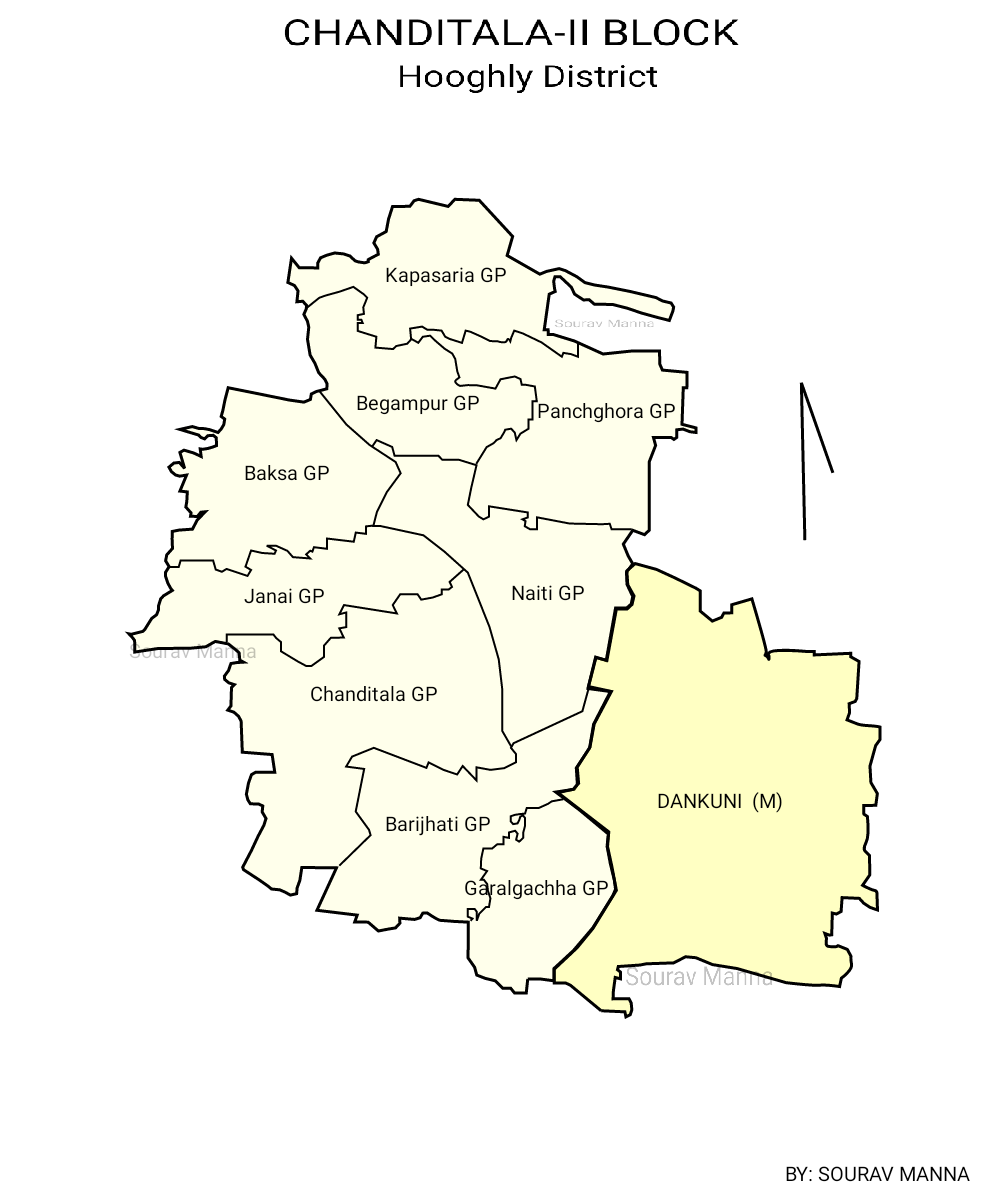
Chanditala-II CD block map

Gram panchayats of Chanditala II block/ panchayat samiti are: Baksa, Begampur, Barijhati, Chanditala, Garalgachha, Janai, Kapashanria, Naiti and Panchghara.

== Demographics ==
=== Population ===
As per the 2011 Census of India, Chanditala II CD Block had a total population of 158,396, of which 48,894 were rural and 109,502 were urban. There were 79,831 (50%) males and 78,565 (50%) females. Population below 6 years was 14,690. Scheduled Castes numbered 24,099 (15.21%) and Scheduled Tribes numbered 1,586 (1.00%).

As per the 2001 census, Chanditala II block had a total population of 213,455, out of which 108,893 were males and 104,562 were females. Chanditala II block registered a population growth of 20.95 per cent during the 1991-2001 decade. Decadal growth for Hooghly district was 15.72 per cent. Decadal growth in West Bengal was 17.84 per cent.

Census Towns in Chanditala II CD Block are (2011 census figures in brackets) : Kharsarai (6,247), Tisa (4,882), Kapashanria (5,148), Jaykrishnapur (5,180), Purba Tajpur (7,035), Begampur (10,487), Baksa (6,432), Panchghara (8,428), Chikrand (10,375), Janai (12,837), Pairagachha (4,703), Naiti (6,996), Barijhati (7,136), Garalgachha (5,411) and Krishnapur (8,205).Mrigala and Monoharpur.#

.# These two were mentioned as Census Towns in 2001 census, but not included in 2011 census.

Large village (4,000+ population) in Chanditala II CD Block are (2011 census figure in brackets): Kalachhara (4,225).

Other villages in Chanditala II CD Block are (2011 census figures in brackets): Adan (3,785), Bamandanga (2,743), Bankagachha (2,424), Beledanga (3,777), Benipur (1,161), Chanditala (3,984), Danpatipur (1,768), Duttapur (2,285), Eklakhi (1,783), Gokulpur (560), Jagannathbati (1,846), Khanpur (3,427), Khoragari (1,827), Madhabpur (3,982), Makhalpara (113), Okardaha (2,944), Sahana (1,944), Sanka (1,265) and Thero (3,051).

=== Literacy ===
As per the 2011 census, the total number of literates in Chanditala II CD Block was 121,837 (84.78% of the population over 6 years) out of which males numbered 63,877 (88.40% of the male population over 6 years) and females numbered 57,960 (81.13% of the female population over 6 years). The gender disparity (the difference between female and male literacy rates) was 7.27%.

As per the 2001 census, Chanditala II block had a total literacy of 59.63 per cent. While male literacy was 78.51 per cent, female literacy was 52.43 per cent.

See also – List of West Bengal districts ranked by literacy rate

Literacy in CD blocks of
Hooghly district
Arambagh subdivision
Arambagh – 79.10
Khanakul I – 77.73
Khanakul II – 79.16
Goghat I – 78.70
Goghat II – 77.24
Pursurah – 82.12
Chandannagar subdivision
Haripal – 78.59
Singur – 84.01
Tarakeswar – 79.96
Chinsurah subdivision
Balagarh – 76.94
Chinsurah Mogra – 83.01
Dhaniakhali – 75.66
Pandua – 75.86
Polba Dadpur – 75.14
Srirampore subdivision
Chanditala I – 83.76
Chanditala II – 84.78
Jangipara – 75.34
Sreerampur Uttarpara – 87.33
Source: 2011 Census: CD Block Wise
Primary Census Abstract Data

=== Language and religion ===
Religion in Chanditala II CD block (2011)
Hinduism	81.35%
Islam	18.41%
Other or not stated	0.24%

As per the 2011 census, majority of the population of the district belong to the Hindu community with a population share of 82.9% followed by Muslims at 15.8%. The percentage of the Hindu population of the district has followed a decreasing trend from 87.1% in 1961 to 82.9% in the latest census 2011. On the other hand, the percentage of Muslim population has increased from 12.7% in 1961 to 15.8% in 2011 census.

In 2011 census Hindus numbered 128,853 and formed 81.35% of the population in Chanditala II CD Block. Muslims numbered 29,162 and formed 18.41% of the population. Others numbered 381 and formed 0.24% of the population.

Languages of Chanditala II CD block (2011)
1. Bengali (98.0%)
2. Hindi (1.72%)
3. Others (0.27%)

At the time of the 2011 census, 98.01% of the population spoke Bengali, and 1.72% Hindi as their first language.

== Rural poverty ==
As per poverty estimates obtained from household survey for families living below poverty line in 2005, rural poverty in Chanditala II CD Block was 8.98%.

== Economy ==
=== Livelihood ===
Livelihood
in Chanditala II CD Block
1. Cultivators (4.18%)
2. Agricultural labourers (6.31%)
3. Household industries (12.0%)
4. Other Workers (77.5%)

In Chanditala II CD Block in 2011, amongst the class of total workers, cultivators formed 4.18%, agricultural labourers 6.31%, household industry workers 12.01% and other workers 77.50%.

=== Infrastructure ===
There are 20 inhabited villages in Chanditala II CD Block. 100% villages have power supply. All 20 villages have more than one source of drinking water (tap, well, tube well, hand pump). 1 village has a post office, 1 village has a sub post offices and 1 village has a post and telegraph office. 18 villages have landlines, 12 villages have public call offices and 19 villages have mobile phone coverage. 6 villages have pucca roads and 4 villages have bus service (public/ private). 1 village has agricultural credit society, 2 villages have commercial/ co-operative banks and 2 villages have bank ATMs.

=== Weaving ===
According to a report in The Hindu, “The Begumpur saris have bewitched wearers with its bright colours and tribal embroidery on the pallu, entirely by hand.” Begumpur which has traditionally been weaving the Dhaniakhali Sari have been trying out new combinations and designs.

Important Handicrafts of Hooghly District
- Zari Work on Sari - Pandua, Pursurah, Jangipara, Tarakeswar and other blocks - 3,000 families involved
- Chikon Embroidery – Babnan, Pandua, Singur - 2,500 families involved
- Silk and Cotton Printing – Serampore (Chanditala) - 300 families involved
- Brass and Bell Metal – Manikpat, Goghat, Arambagh - 150 families involved
- Conch Shell – Pandua, Khanakul, Makla, Chandannagar
- Jute Diversified Product – Baidyabati, Mogra
- Terracota – Chinsurah, Chandannagar, Baidyabati, Mogra

Source:District Human Development Report 2010: Hooghly P. 67

=== Agriculture ===
Although an overwhelming majority of the people is engaged in non-agricultural pursuits, this is a rich agricultural area with several cold storages. Though rice is the prime crop of the district, the agricultural economy largely depends on potato, jute, vegetables, and orchard products. Vegetable is a prize crop in the blocks of Haripal, Singur, Chanditala, Polba and Dhaniakhali being grown in a relay system throughout the year. Potato is cultivated in all the blocks of this district.

Some of the primary and other hats or markets in the Chanditala II CD Block area are: Begumpur hat, Begumpur bazar, Manirampur hat, Chanditala market, Padkumra hat, Dankuni market, Janai bazar and Tajpur market.

In 2013-14, the small percentage of persons engaged in agriculture in Chanditala II CD Block could be classified as follows: bargadars 13.61%, patta (document) holders 3.05%, small farmers (possessing land between 1 and 2 hectares) 1.53%, marginal farmers (possessing land up to 1 hectare) 39.35% and agricultural labourers 42.46%.

Chanditala II CD Block had 28 fertiliser depots, 8 seed stores and 59 fair price shops in 2013-14.

In 2013-14, Chanditala II CD Block produced 737 tonnes of Aman paddy, the main winter crop from 293 hectares, 4,984 tonnes of Boro paddy (spring crop) from 1,435 hectares, 3,637 tonnes of jute from 171 hectares, 39,004 tonnes of potatoes from 1,478 hectares. It also produced pulses and oilseeds .

In 2013-14, the total area irrigated in Chanditala II CD Block was 5,135 hectares, out of which 765 hectares were irrigated by canal water, 3,400 hectares by tank water, 480 hectares by deep tube wells and 490 hectares by shallow tube wells.

=== Banking ===
In 2013-14, Chanditala II CD Block had offices of 16 commercial banks.

== Transport ==
Chanditala II CD Block has 5 originating/ terminating bus routes.

The Howrah–Bardhaman chord, a shorter link to Bardhaman from Howrah than the Howrah–Bardhaman main line, was constructed in 1917. There are stations at Belanagar, Dankuni, Gobra, Janai Road and Begampur.

It is part of Kolkata Suburban Railway system.

== Education ==
In 2013-14, Chanditala II CD Block had 89 primary schools with 12,134 students, 6 high schools with 3,652 students and 12 higher secondary schools with 17,585 students. Chanditala II CD Block had 222 institutions for special and non-formal education with 5,245 students

In Chanditala II CD Block, amongst the 20 inhabited villages, only 1 village had no school, 7 villages had more than 1 primary school, 15 villages had at least 1 primary school, 4 villages had at least 1 primary and 1 middle school and 2 villages had at least 1 middle and 1 secondary school.

== Healthcare ==
In 2014, Chanditala II CD Block had 1 rural hospital, 2 primary health centres and 9 private nursing homes with total 80 beds and 8 doctors (excluding private bodies). It had 41 family welfare subcentres. 4,645 patients were treated indoor and 316,246 patients were treated outdoor in the hospitals, health centres and subcentres of the CD Block.

Chanditala II CD Block has Chanditala Rural Hospital (with 30 beds) at Chanditala, Begampur Primary Health Centre (with 4 beds) and Janai Baksa PHC at Janai (with 10 beds).

Chanditala II CD Block is one of the areas of Hooghly district where ground water is affected by moderate level of arsenic contamination. The WHO guideline for arsenic in drinking water is 10 mg/ litre, and the Indian Standard value is 50 mg/ litre. In Hooghly district, 16 blocks have arsenic levels above WHO guidelines and 11 blocks above Indian standard value. The maximum concentration in Chanditala II CD Block is 103 mg/litre.
