= Paschim Tajpur =

- Village
- Location in West Bengal, India Paschim Tajpur (India)
- Coordinates: 22.7554061°N 88.1860899°E
- Country: India
- State: West Bengal
- District: Hooghly

Government
  - Body: Gram panchayat

Population (2011)
  - Total: 1,873

Languages
  - Official: Bengali, English
- Time zone: UTC+5:30 (IST)
- ISO 3166 code: IN-WB
- Vehicle registration: WB
- Lok Sabha constituency: Serampore
- Vidhan Sabha constituency: Chanditala
- Website: wb.gov.in

Paschim Tajpur is a village in Chanditala I community development block of Srirampore subdivision in Hooghly district in the Indian state of West Bengal.

== Geography ==
Paschim Tajpur is located at 22.7554061°N 88.1860899°E.

=== Gram panchayat ===
Villages in Shiakhala gram panchayat, in addition to Paschim Tajpur, are: Chak Tajpur, Madhupur, Patul, Raghunathpur, Sandhipur and Sehakhala.

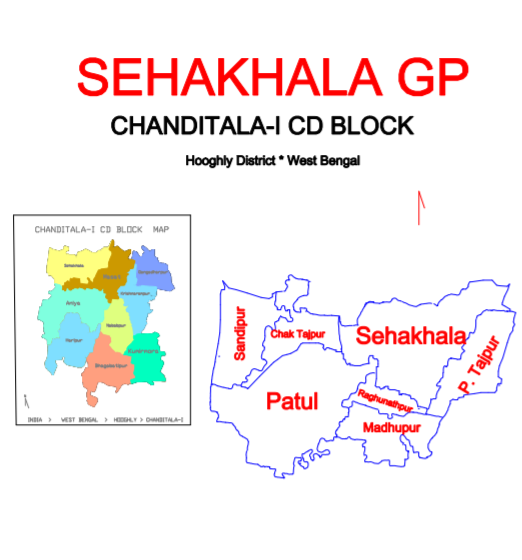
Map of Sehakhala GP

== Demographics ==
As per 2011 Census of India Paschim Tajpur had a population of 1,873 of which 911 (49%) were males and 962 (51%) were females. Population below 6 years was 185. The total number of literates in Paschim Tajpur was 1,307 (77.43% of the population over 6 years).
