= Sanka, Hooghly =

Sanka
- Village
- Location in West Bengal, India Sanka (India)
- Coordinates: 22.7561°N 88.2411°E
- Country: India
- State: West Bengal
- District: Hooghly

Government
  - Body: Gram panchayat

Population (2011)
  - Total: 1,265

Languages
  - Official: Bengali, English
- Time zone: UTC+5:30 (IST)
- ISO 3166 code: IN-WB
- Vehicle registration: WB
- Website: wb.gov.in

Sanka is a village in Chanditala II community development block of Srirampore subdivision in Hooghly district in the Indian state of West Bengal.

== Geography ==
Sanka is located at 22.7561°N 88.2411°E. Chanditala police station serves this Village.

=== Gram panchayat ===
Villages and census towns in Kapasaria gram panchayat are: Kapashanria, Okardaha, Sahana, Sanka and Tisa.

== Demographics ==
As per 2011 Census of India, Sanka had a total population of 1,265 of which 618 (49%) were males and 647 (51%) were females. Population below 6 years was 93. The total number of literates in Sanka was 968 (82.59% of the population over 6 years).

== Transport ==
The nearest railway station, Baruipara railway station, is 27 kilometres (17 mi) from Howrah on the Howrah-Bardhaman chord line and is a part of the Kolkata Suburban Railway system.
