= Khanpur, Chanditala-II =

Khanpur
- Village
- Location in West Bengal, India Khanpur (India)
- Coordinates: 22.6744°N 88.2544°E
- Country: India
- State: West Bengal
- District: Hooghly

Government
  - Body: Gram panchayat

Population (2011)
  - Total: 3,427

Languages
  - Official: Bengali, English
- Time zone: UTC+5:30 (IST)
- ISO 3166 code: IN-WB
- Vehicle registration: WB
- Lok Sabha constituency: Serampore
- Vidhan Sabha constituency: Chanditala
- Website: wb.gov.in

Khanpur is a village in Chanditala II community development block of Srirampore subdivision in Hooghly district in the Indian state of West Bengal.

== Geography ==
Khanpur is located at 22.6744°N 88.2544°E. Chanditala police station serves this Village.

=== Gram panchayat ===
Villages and census towns in Barijhati gram panchayat are: Barijhati, Beledanga, Gokulpur, Khanpur, Makhalpara and Thero.

== Demographics ==
As per 2011 Census of India, Khanpur had a population of 3,427 of which 1 ,582 (46%) were males and 1,845 (54%) females. Population below 6 years was 360. The number of literates in Khanpur was 2,559 (83.44% of the population over 6 years).
