= Patul, Chanditala-I =

Patul
- Village
- Location in West Bengal, India Patul (India)
- Coordinates: 22.7525923°N 88.1552353°E
- Country: India
- State: West Bengal
- District: Hooghly

Government
  - Body: Gram panchayat

Population (2011)
  - Total: 4,083

Languages
  - Official: Bengali, English
- Time zone: UTC+5:30 (IST)
- ISO 3166 code: IN-WB
- Vehicle registration: WB
- Lok Sabha constituency: Serampore
- Vidhan Sabha constituency: Chanditala
- Website: wb.gov.in

Patul is a village in Chanditala I community development block of Srirampore subdivision in Hooghly district in the Indian state of West Bengal.

== Geography ==
Patul is located at: 22.7525923°N 88.1552353°E

=== Gram panchayat ===
Villages in Shiakhala gram panchayat are: Chak Tajpur, Madhupur, Paschim Tajpur, Patul, Raghunathpur, Sandhipur and Sehakhala.

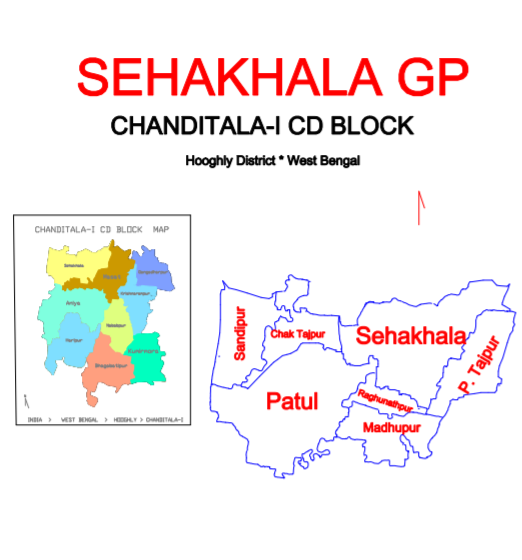
Map of Sehakhala GP

== Demographics ==
As per 2011 Census of India Patul had a population of 4,083 of which 2,019 (49%) were males and 2,064 (51%) were females. Population below 6 years was 385. The number of literates in Patul was 3,350 (90.59% of the population over 6 years).
