= Mrigala =

- Village
- Location in West Bengal, India Mrigala (India)
- Coordinates: 22.67°N 88.29°E
- Country: India
- State: West Bengal
- District: Hooghly

Population (2011)
  - Total: 17,664

Languages
  - Official: Bengali, English
- Time zone: UTC+5:30 (IST)
- Vehicle registration: WB
- Website: wb.gov.in

Mrigala is a village in Chanditala II CD Block in Srirampore subdivision of Hooghly district in the Indian state of West Bengal. It was earlier recorded as a census town.

== Geography ==
Mrigala is located at 22.67°N 88.29°E.

== Demographics ==
As of 2001 India census, Mrigala had a population of 17,664. Males constituted 51% of the population and females 49%. Mrigala had an average literacy rate of 73%, higher than the national average at the time, which was 59.5%: male literacy was 78%, and female literacy 67%. In Mrigala, 11% of the population was under 6 years of age.
