= Raghunathpur, Chanditala-I =

Raghunathpur
- Village
- Location in West Bengal, India Raghunathpur (India)
- Coordinates: 22.7534005°N 88.1721126°E
- Country: India
- State: West Bengal
- District: Hooghly

Government
  - Body: Gram panchayat

Population (2011)
  - Total: 645

Languages
  - Official: Bengali, English
- Time zone: UTC+5:30 (IST)
- PIN: 712706
- ISO 3166 code: IN-WB
- Vehicle registration: WB
- Lok Sabha constituency: Serampore
- Vidhan Sabha constituency: Chanditala
- Website: wb.gov.in

Raghunathpur is a village in Chanditala I community development block of Srirampore subdivision in Hooghly district in the Indian state of West Bengal.

== Geography ==
Raghunathpur is located at 22.7534005°N 88.1721126°E.

=== Gram panchayat ===
Villages in Shiakhala gram panchayat are: Chak Tajpur, Madhupur, Paschim Tajpur, Patul, Raghunathpur, Sandhipur and Sehakhala.

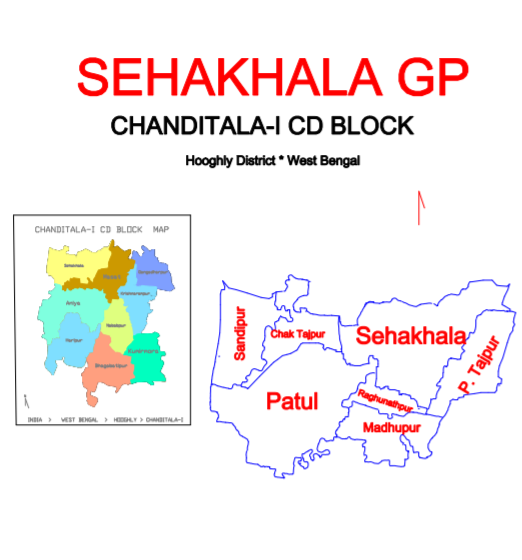
Map of Sehakhala GP

== Demographics ==
As per 2011 Census of India Raghunathpur had a total population of 645 of which 322 (50%) were males and 323 (50%) were females. Population below 6 years was 87. The number of literates in Raghunathpur was 409 (73.30% of the population over 6 years).
