= Chak Tajpur =

- Village
- Location in West Bengal, India Chak Tajpur (India)
- Coordinates: 22.7634025°N 88.1584274°E
- Country: India
- State: West Bengal
- District: Hooghly

Government
  - Body: Gram panchayat

Population (2011)
  - Total: 2,692

Languages
  - Official: Bengali, English
- Time zone: UTC+5:30 (IST)
- ISO 3166 code: IN-WB
- Vehicle registration: WB
- Lok Sabha constituency: Serampore
- Vidhan Sabha constituency: Chanditala
- Website: wb.gov.in

Chak Tajpur is a village in Chanditala I community development block of Srirampore subdivision in Hooghly district in the Indian state of West Bengal.

== Geography ==
Chak Tajpur is located at 22.7634025°N 88.1584274°E.

=== Gram panchayat ===
Villages in Shiakhala gram panchayat are: Chak Tajpur, Madhupur, Paschim Tajpur, Patul, Raghunathpur, Sandhipur and Sehakhala.

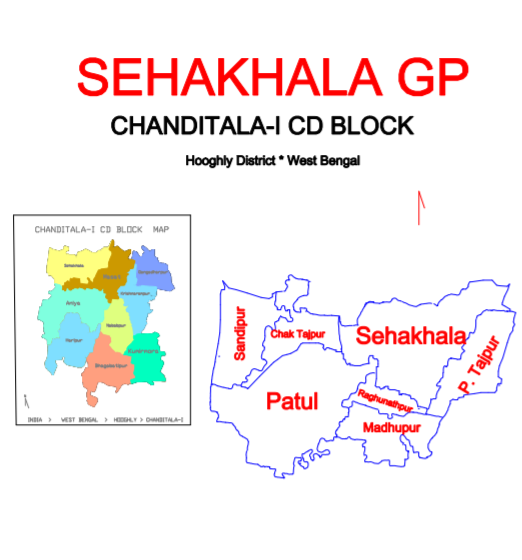
Map of Sehakhala GP

== Demographics ==
As per 2011 Census of India Chak Tajpur had a population of 2,692, of which 1,308 (49%) were males and 1,384 (51%) females. Population below 6 years was 297. The number of literates in Chak Tajpur was 1,945 (81.21% of the population over 6 years).
