= Okardaha =

Ugardaha
- Village
- Location in West Bengal, India Ugardaha (India)
- Coordinates: 22.7607°N 88.2534°E
- Country: India
- State: West Bengal
- District: Hooghly

Government
  - Body: Gram panchayat

Population (2011)
  - Total: 2,944

Languages
  - Official: Bengali, English
- Time zone: UTC+5:30 (IST)
- Vehicle registration: WB
- Website: wb.gov.in

Okardaha is a village in the Chanditala II community development block, Srirampore subdivision, Hooghly district in the Indian state of West Bengal.

== Geography ==
Okardaha is located at 22.7607°N 88.2534°E.

== Demographics ==
As per the 2011 Census of India, Okardaha had a population of 2,944 of which 1,503 (51%) were males and 1,441 (49%) females. The number of people who were under 6 years old was 268. The total number of literate people in Okardaha was 2,286 (85.43% of the population over 6 years).

Villages and census towns in the Kapasaria gram panchayat are: Kapashanria, Okardaha, Sahana, Sanka and Tisa.

== Transport ==
The nearest railway station, Baruipara railway station, is 27 kilometres (17 mi) from Howrah on the Howrah-Bardhaman chord line and is a part of the Kolkata Suburban Railway system.

The main road is Rd Number 31. It is the villages main road and is connected to the NH-19 and the Grand Trunk Road.
