= Sahana, Hooghly =

Sahana
- Village
- Location in West Bengal, India Sahana (India)
- Coordinates: 22.7612°N 88.2640°E
- Country: India
- State: West Bengal
- District: Hooghly

Government
  - Body: Gram panchayat

Population (2011)
  - Total: 1,944

Languages
  - Official: Bengali, English
- Time zone: UTC+5:30 (IST)
- ISO 3166 code: IN-WB
- Vehicle registration: WB
- Website: wb.gov.in

Sahana is a village in Chanditala II community development block of Srirampore subdivision in Hooghly district in the Indian state of West Bengal.

== Geography ==
Sahana is located at 22.7612°N 88.2640°E. Chanditala police station serves this Village.

=== Gram panchayat ===
Villages and census towns in Kapasaria gram panchayat are: Kapashanria, Okardaha, Sahana, Sanka and Tisa.

== Demographics ==
As per 2011 Census of India, Sahana had a total population of 1,944 of which 921 (47%) were males and 1,023 (53%) were females. Population below 6 years was 263. The total number of literates in Sahana was 1,340 (79.71% of the population over 6 years).

== Transport ==
The nearest railway station, Baruipara railway station, is 27 kilometres (17 mi) from Howrah on the Howrah-Bardhaman chord line and is a part of the Kolkata Suburban Railway system.

The main road is NH-19 (old number NH 2)/ Durgapur Exptressway. It is the main artery of the village.
