= Sandhipur =

- Village
- Location in West Bengal, India Sandhipur (India)
- Coordinates: 22.7599313°N 88.1448°E
- Country: India
- State: West Bengal
- District: Hooghly

Government
  - Body: Gram panchayat

Population (2011)
  - Total: 2,186

Languages
  - Official: Bengali, English
- Time zone: UTC+5:30 (IST)
- ISO 3166 code: IN-WB
- Vehicle registration: WB
- Lok Sabha constituency: Serampore
- Vidhan Sabha constituency: Chanditala
- Website: wb.gov.in

Sandhipur is a village in Chanditala I community development block of Srirampore subdivision in Hooghly district in the Indian state of West Bengal.

== Geography ==
Sandhipur is located at 22.7599313°N 88.1448°E.

=== Gram panchayat ===
Villages in Shiakhala gram panchayat are: Chak Tajpur, Madhupur, Paschim Tajpur, Patul, Raghunathpur, Sandhipur and Sehakhala.

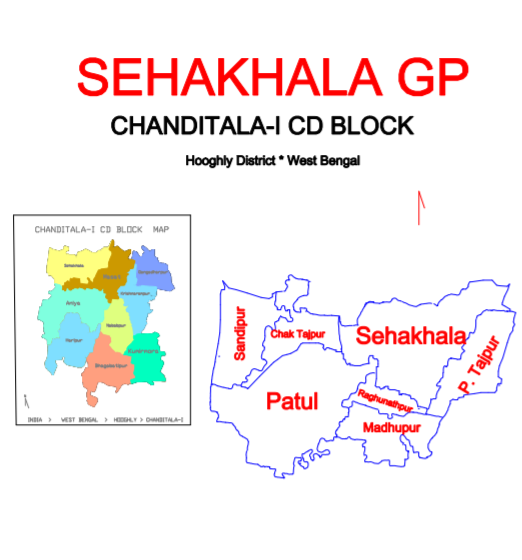
Map of Sehakhala GP

== Demographics ==
As per 2011 Census of India, Sandhipur's population was 2.186 of which 1,118 (51%) were males and 1,068 (49%) were females. Population below 6 years was 285. The number of literates in Sandhipur was 1,551 (81.59% of the population over 6 years).
