= Azabnagar =

- Village
- Location in West Bengal, India Azabnagar (India)
- Coordinates: 22.77273°N 88.19805°E
- Country: India
- State: West Bengal
- District: Hooghly

Government
  - Type: Panchayati raj (India)
  - Body: Gram panchayat

Population (2011)
  - Total: 1,021

Languages
  - Official: Bengali, English
- Time zone: UTC+5:30 (IST)
- ISO 3166 code: IN-WB
- Vehicle registration: WB
- Lok Sabha constituency: Serampore
- Vidhan Sabha constituency: Chanditala
- Website: wb.gov.in

Azabnagar is a village in Chanditala I community development block of Srirampore subdivision in Hooghly district in the Indian state of West Bengal.

== Geography ==
Azabnagar is located at 22.77273°N 88.19805°E.

=== Gram panchayat ===
Villages and census towns in Masat gram panchayat are: Aushbati, Azabnagar, Banamalipur, Chhunche, Krishnanagar and Masat.

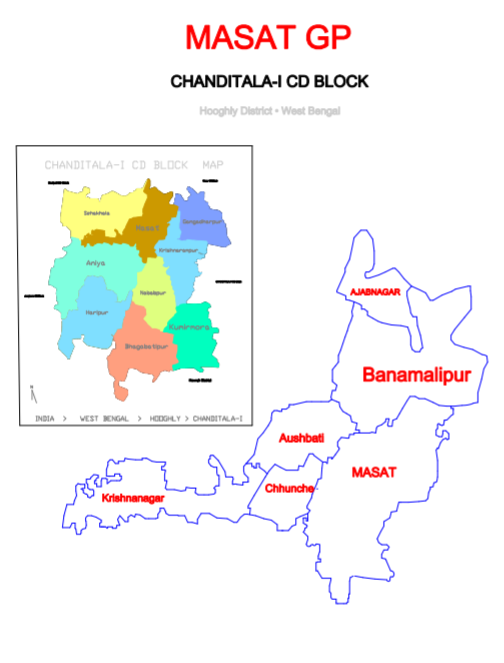
Map of Masat GP, CHANDITALA-I

== Demographics ==
As per 2011 Census of India, Azabnagar had a population of 1,021 of which 427 (42%) were males and 594 (58%) were females. Population below 6 years was 142. The total number of literates in Azabnagar was 674 (76.68% of the population over 6 years).
