= Sehakhala =

Sheakhala Shiyakhala, Shihakhala
- Village
- Location in West Bengal, India Sheakhala (India)
- Coordinates: 22.7677229°N 88.1743169°E
- Country: India
- State: West Bengal
- District: Hooghly

Government
  - Body: Gram panchayat

Population (2011)
  - Total: 6,434

Languages
  - Official: Bengali, English
- Time zone: UTC+5:30 (IST)
- Telephone code: 03212
- ISO 3166 code: IN-WB
- Vehicle registration: WB
- Lok Sabha constituency: Serampore
- Vidhan Sabha constituency: Chanditala
- Website: wb.gov.in

Sheakhala is a village and a gram panchayat in Chanditala I community development block in Srirampore subdivision of Hooghly district in the state of West Bengal, India. It is under Chanditala police station.

== Geography ==
Sheakhala is located at 22.7677229°N 88.1743169°E.

=== Gram panchayat ===
Villages in Shiakhala gram panchayat are: Chak Tajpur, Madhupur, Paschim Tajpur, Patul, Raghunathpur, Sandhipur and Sehakhala.

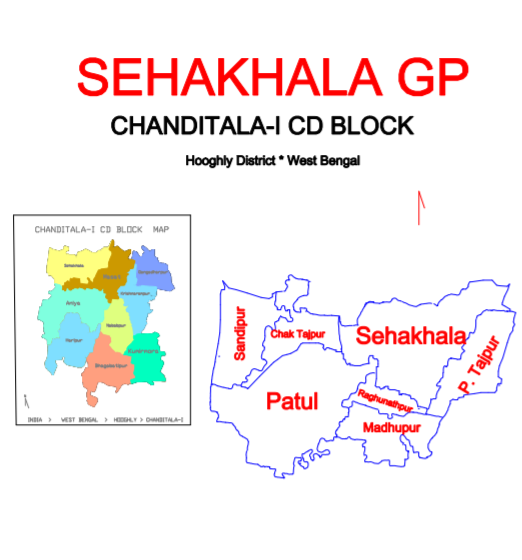
Map of Sehakhala GP

== Demographics ==
As per 2011 Census of India Sehakhala had a total population of 6,434 of which 3,253 (51%) were males and 3,181 (49%) were females. Population below 6 years was 542. The total number of literates in Sehakhela was 4,955 (84.10% of the population over 6 years).

== Transport ==
=== Railway ===
The nearest Railway station, Baruipara railway station, is on the Howrah-Bardhaman chord line, which is a part of the Kolkata Suburban Railway system. Sheakhala had a railway station from 1915-1971 under Narrow Gauge Railway. Railway Station Board can be still seen beside SH 15 as the highway follows the same path and route of the erstwhile Martin's Light Railways Sheakhala line.

=== Road ===
State Highway 15 (Ahilyabai Holkar Road) and 31 Number Road crossing point is located in the village. 31 Number Road is the main artery of the town and it is also connected with National Highway 19 (Bora), State Highway 13 (Milki Badamtala) and State Highway 6/ G.T. Road (Nabagram).

=== Bus ===
==== Private Bus ====
- 26 Bonhooghly – Champadanga
- 31 Serampore - Jangipara
- 26A Serampore -Aushbali
- 26C Bonhooghly - Jagatballavpur
- E36 Esplanade - Champadanga

== Education ==
- Sheakhala Benimadhab High School
- Sheakhala Benimadhab Girls High School
