= Krishnanagar, Hooghly =

Krishnanagar
- Village
- Location in West Bengal, India Krishnanagar (India)
- Coordinates: 22.7401°N 88.1675°E
- Country: India
- State: West Bengal
- District: Hooghly

Government
  - Type: Panchayati raj (India)
  - Body: Gram panchayat

Population (2011)
  - Total: 1,712

Languages
  - Official: Bengali, English
- Time zone: UTC+5:30 (IST)
- ISO 3166 code: IN-WB
- Vehicle registration: WB
- Lok Sabha constituency: Serampore
- Vidhan Sabha constituency: Chanditala
- Website: wb.gov.in

Krishnanagar is a village in Chanditala I community development block of Srirampore subdivision in Hooghly district in the Indian state of West Bengal.

== Geography ==
Krishnanagar is located at 22.7401°N 88.1675°E.

=== Gram panchayat ===
Villages and census towns in Masat gram panchayat are: Aushbati, Azabnagar, Banamalipur, Chhunche, Krishnanagar and Masat.

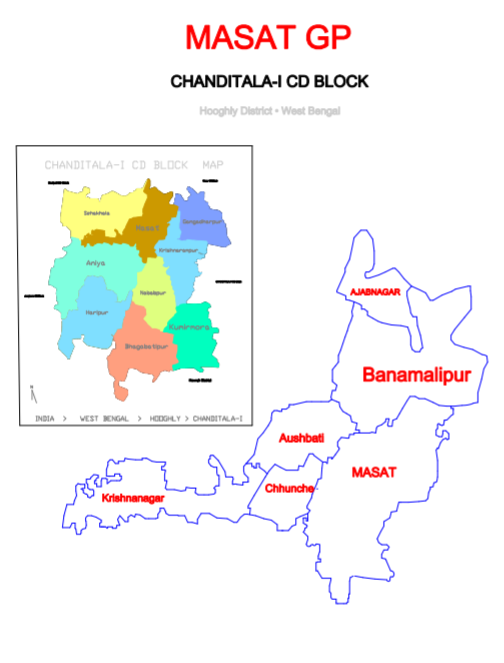
Map of Masat GP, CHANDITALA-I

== Demographics ==
As per 2011 Census of India Krishnanagar had a population of 1,712, of which 875 (51%) were males and 837 (49%) females. Population below 6 years was 155. The number of literates in Krishnanagar was 1,191 (76.49% of the population over 6 years).
