= Banamalipur, Hooghly =

Banamalipur
- Village
- Location in West Bengal, India Banamalipur (India)
- Coordinates: 22.7610599°N 88.19973°E
- Country: India
- State: West Bengal
- District: Hooghly

Government
  - Type: West Bengal
  - Body: Gram panchayat

Population (2011)
  - Total: 3,443

Languages
  - Official: Bengali, English
- Time zone: UTC+5:30 (IST)
- Telephone code: 03212
- ISO 3166 code: IN-WB
- Vehicle registration: WB
- Lok Sabha constituency: Serampore
- Vidhan Sabha constituency: Chanditala
- Website: wb.gov.in

Banamalipur is a village in Chanditala I community development block of Srirampore subdivision in Hooghly district in the Indian state of West Bengal.

== Geography ==
Banamalipur is located at 22.7610599°N 88.19973°E.

=== Gram panchayat ===
Villages and census towns in Masat gram panchayat are: Aushbati, Azabnagar, Banamalipur, Chhunche, Krishnanagar and Masat.

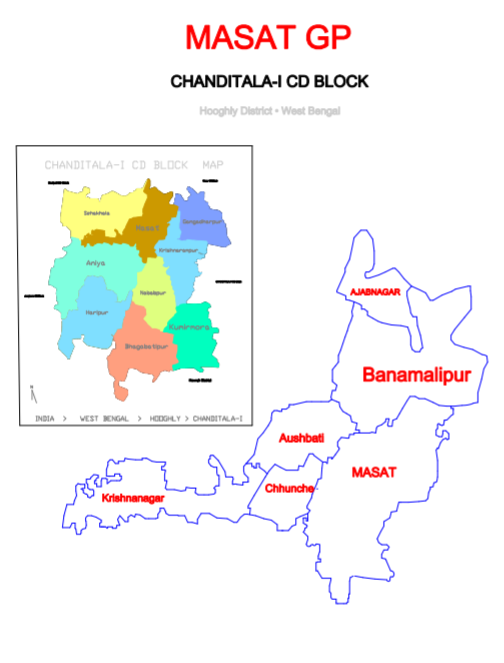
Map of Masat GP, CHANDITALA-I

== Demographics ==
As per 2011 Census of India Banamalipur had a population of 3.443 of which 1,813 (53%) were males and 1,630 (47%) females. Population below 6 years was 338. The number of literates in Banamalipur was 2,695 (86.80% of the population over 6 years).

== Transport ==
The nearest railway station, Baruipara railway station, is on the Howrah-Bardhaman chord, which is a part of the Kolkata Suburban Railway.

The main road is 31 Number Road. It is the main artery of the village and it is connected with Ahilyabai Holkar Road (Sehakhala), National Highway 19 (Bora), State Highway 13 (Milki Badamtala) and State Highway 6/ G.T. Road (Nabagram).

There is 31 Number Private Bus from Jangipara bus stand to Serampore bus stand via Furfura Sharif, Sehakhala, Banamalipur, Gangadharpur, Baruipara, Bora and Milki Badamtala.

== Bramha Datta Dham ==
Shri Narayan Maharaj (Anna) is a Sadguru from Narayanpur, Pune. The motto of Sadguru Narayan Maharaj is to awaken humanity in humans "माणसातला माणूस जागा करणे". Narayan Maharaj is building "Char DattaDhams" in four different directions in India, of which 2 Dhams have already been completed.

- First of the Char Dattadhams has been constructed in Madhya Pradesh "Shiva Datta Dham, Jalkoti, Maheshwar, Khargone Shiv Datta Dham, Jalkoti, Maheshwar, Madhya Pradesh"
- Second of the Char Dattadhams is in Kanyakumari Anusaya Datta Dham, Vattakottai, Kanyakumari"Anusaya Datta Dham, Vatta-kottai Vattakottai Fort, Anju Gramam, Kanyakumari".
- Third of the Char Dattadhams is near Kolkata "Bramha Datta Dham" and it is under construction situated in Bramha Datta Dham, Baruipara, Kolkata"Baruipara". This will be the largest Hindu temple in West Bengal.
- Shri Atri Dattadham, Himachal Pradesh
