= Bora Kamalapur =

Bora Kamalapur Bora komlapur
- Village
- Location in West Bengal, India Bora Kamalapur (India)
- Coordinates: 22.762285°N 88.276025°E
- Country: India
- State: West Bengal
- District: Hooghly

Population (2011)
  - Total: 20,047

Languages
  - Official: Bengali, English
- Time zone: UTC+5:30 (IST)
- Telephone code: 03212
- Lok Sabha constituency: Hooghly
- Vidhan Sabha constituency: Singur

Bora Kamalapur is a village in the Hooghly district in the state of West Bengal, India. It is under Singur police station in Chandannagore subdivision.

== Geography ==
Bora Kamalapur is located at: 22°45′44″N 88°16′34″E.

== Transportation ==
The nearest railway station is Baruipara railway station on the Howrah-Bardhaman chord line of Kolkata Suburban Railway. National Highway 19 passes through the village and intersects with 31 Number Road, which is the main artery of the village. Besides National Highway 19, it is also connected with Ahilyabai Holkar Road (Sehakhala), State Highway 13 (Milki Badamtala) and State Highway 6/ G.T. Road (Nabagram). There is 31 Number Private Bus from Jangipara Bus Stand to Serampore Bus Stand via Furfura Sharif, Sehakhala, Banmalipur, Gangadharpur, Baruipara, Bora Kamalapur and Milki Badamtala.

== Health ==
Bora Primary Health Centre

== Educational ==
Kamalapur Prathamik Vidyalaya, Kamalapur High School
