= Aushbati =

Aushbali Ausbali
- Village
- Location in West Bengal, India Aushbali (India)
- Coordinates: 22.7483753°N 88.186575°E
- Country: India
- State: West Bengal
- District: Hooghly

Government
  - Body: Gram panchayat

Population (2011)
  - Total: 2,246

Languages
  - Official: Bengali, English
- Time zone: UTC+5:30 (IST)
- PIN: 712701
- ISO 3166 code: IN-WB
- Vehicle registration: WB
- Lok Sabha constituency: Serampore
- Vidhan Sabha constituency: Chanditala
- Website: wb.gov.in

Aushbali is a village in Chanditala I community development block of Srirampore subdivision in Hooghly district in the Indian state of West Bengal.

== Geography ==
Aushbali is located at: 22.7483753°N 88.186575°E.

=== Gram panchayat ===
Villages and census towns in Masat gram panchayat are: Aushbali, Azabnagar, Banamalipur, Chhunche, Krishnanagar and Masat.

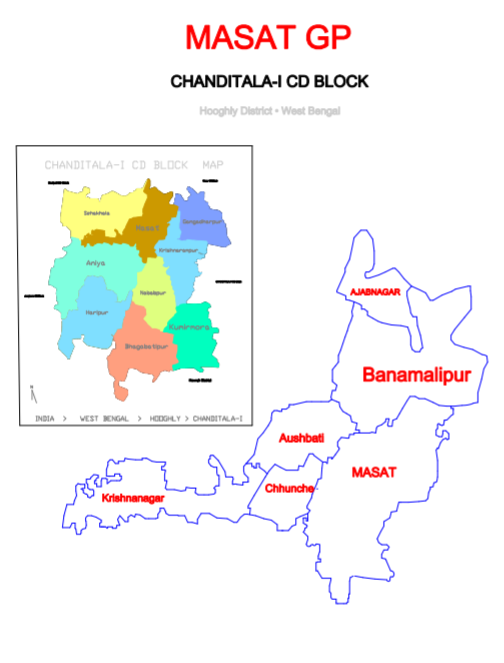
Map of Masat GP, CHANDITALA-I

== Demographics ==
As per 2011 Census of India, Aushbali had a population of 2,246, of which 1,140 (51%) were males and 1,106 (49%) females. Population below 6 years was 250. The total number of literates in Aushbali was 1,525 (76.40% of the population over 6 years).

== Transport ==
=== Railway ===
Baruipara railway station, its nearest railway station, is on the Howrah-Bardhaman chord line and is a part of the Kolkata Suburban Railway system.

=== Road ===
The main road is SH 15 (Ahilyabai Holkar Road). It is the main artery of the village and it is connected to NH 19 (old numbering NH 2)/ Durgapur Expressway.

=== Bus ===
==== Private Bus ====
- 26 Bonhooghly - Champadanga
- 26A Serampore - Aushbali

==== Bus Routes without Numbers ====
- Howrah Station - Bandar (Dhanyaghori)
