= Gobra railway station =

Railway station in West Bengal, India

Gobra
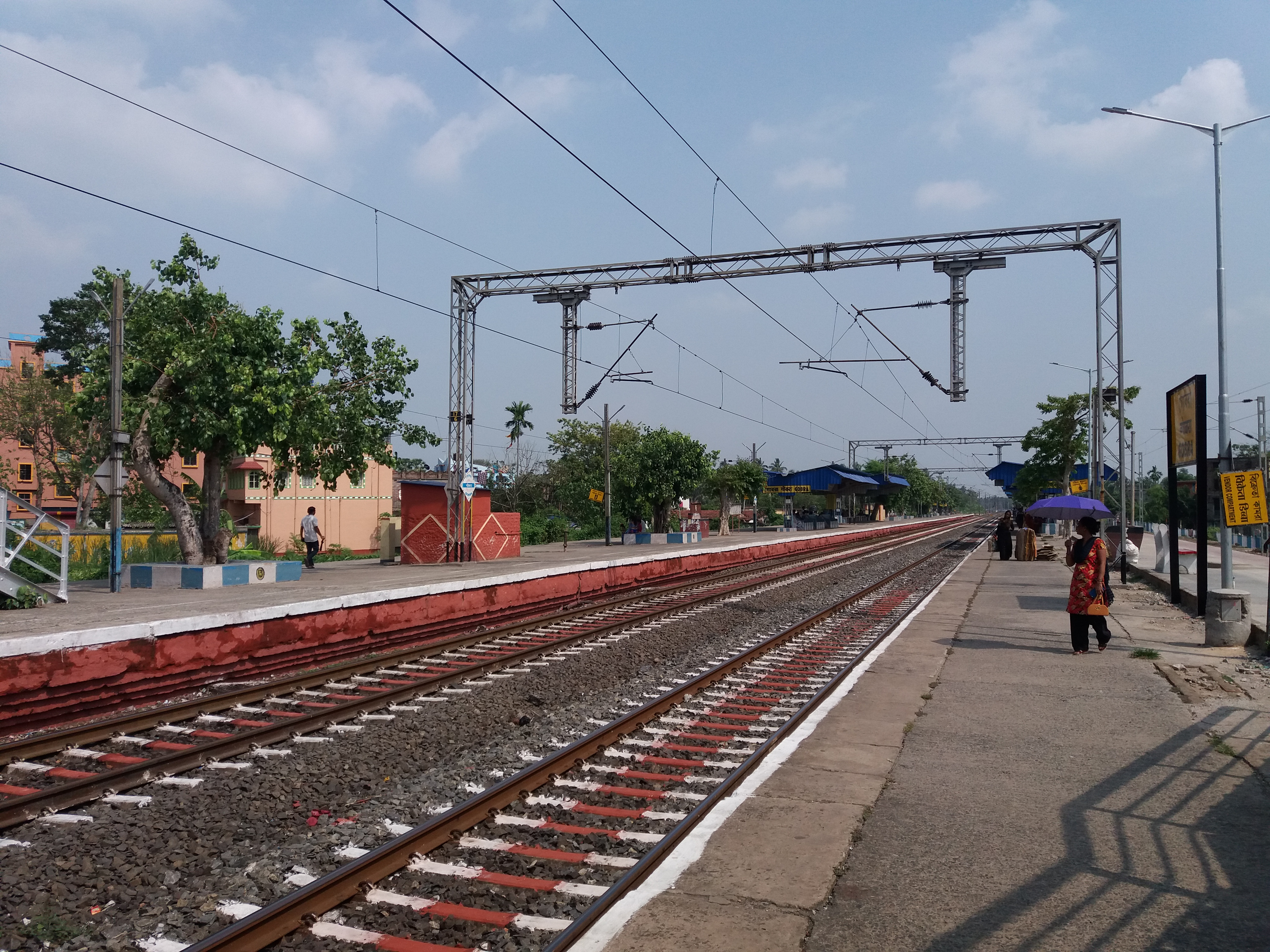
- Gobra railway station platforms

General information
- Location: Gobra, Dankuni, Hooghly district, West Bengal; India
- Coordinates: 22°41′46″N 88°16′46″E
- Elevation: 6 metres (20 ft)
- System: Kolkata Suburban Railway
- Owner: Indian Railways
- Operator: Eastern Railway
- Line: Howrah–Bardhaman chord
- Platforms: 4
- Tracks: 4

Construction
- Structure type: Standard (on ground station)
- Parking: No

Other information
- Status: Functioning
- Station code: GBRA
- Division(s): Howrah

History
- Opened: 1917
- Electrified: 1964
- Former names: East Indian Railway Company

Services
Preceding station	Kolkata Suburban Railway	Following station
Dankuni Junction towards Howrah Junction	Eastern Line Howrah–Bardhaman chord	Janai Road towards Barddhaman Junction
Route map
Location
- Location within West Bengal Location within India

Gobra railway station is a Kolkata Suburban Railway station on the Howrah–Bardhaman chord line operated by Eastern Railway zone of Indian Railways. It is situated at Gobra, Dankuni in Hooghly district in the Indian state of West Bengal.

== History ==
The Howrah–Bardhaman chord, the 95 kilometers railway line was constructed in 1917. It was connected with Sealdah through Dankuni after the construction of Vivekananda Setu in 1932. Howrah to Bardhaman chord line including Gobra railway station was electrified in 1964–66.
