= Janai Road railway station =

Railway station in West Bengal, India

Janai Road
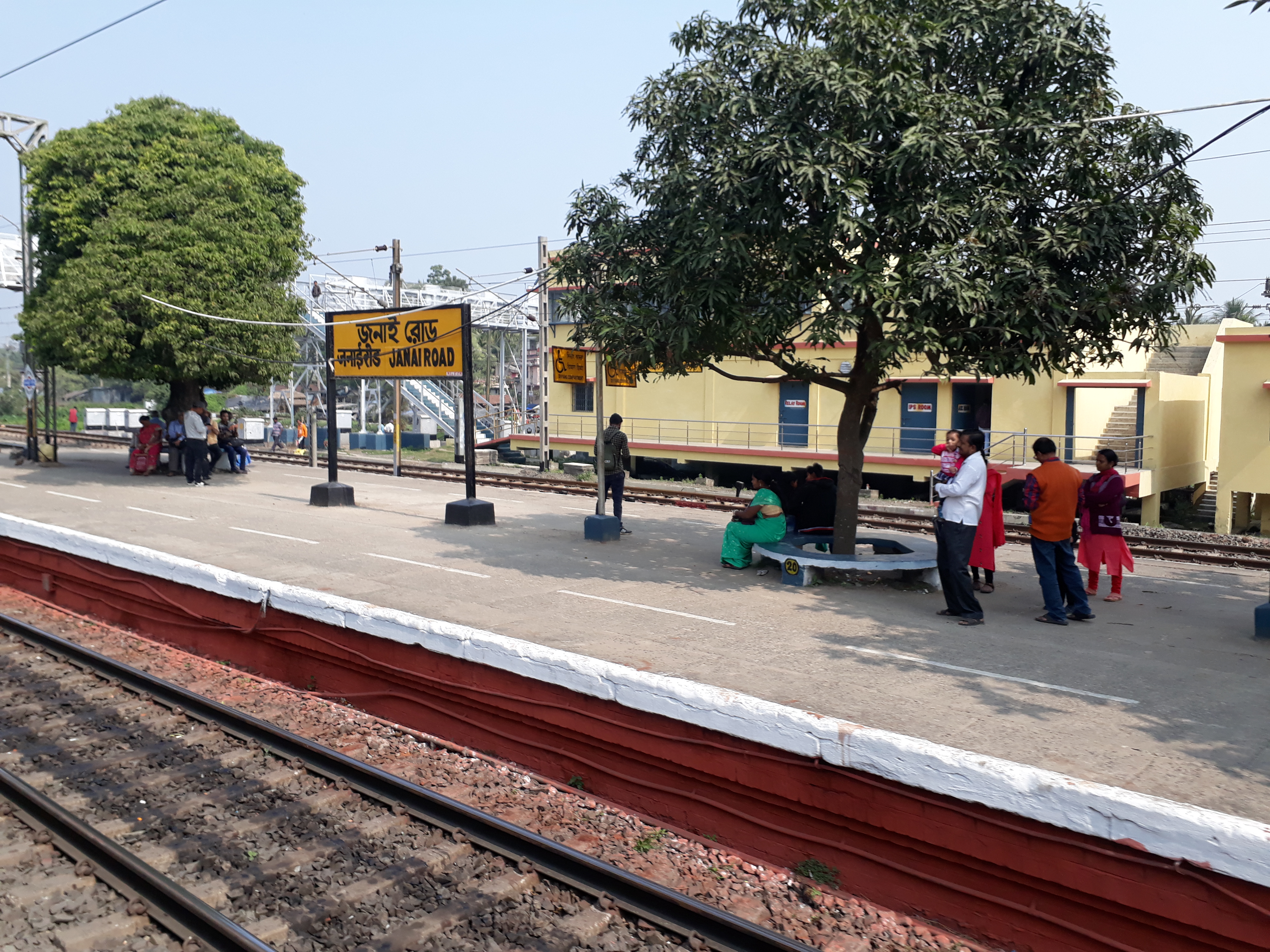
- Janai Road railway station

General information
- Location: Janai Road, Hooghly, West Bengal; India
- Coordinates: 22°43′15″N 88°15′57″E
- Elevation: 39.23 metres (128.7 ft)
- System: Kolkata Suburban Railway station
- Owner: Indian Railways
- Operator: Eastern Railway zone
- Line: Howrah–Bardhaman chord
- Platforms: 4

Construction
- Structure type: Standard (on-ground station)
- Parking: No
- Cycle facilities: Yes

Other information
- Status: Functioning
- Station code: JOX
- Zone(s): Eastern Railway zone
- Division(s): Howrah

History
- Opened: 1917; 109 years ago
- Electrified: 1964–66
- Former names: East Indian Railway Company

Services
| Preceding station | Kolkata Suburban Railway | Following station |
|---|---|---|
| Gobra towards Howrah Junction | Eastern Line Chord line | Begampur towards Barddhaman Junction |
Route map
Location
- Location within West Bengal Location within India

Janai Road railway station is a railway station on the Howrah–Bardhaman chord of Howrah Railway division of the Eastern Railway zone. It is located in Hooghly district in the Indian state of West Bengal.
