= Bandel =

Bandel ব্যাণ্ডেল Bandal
- City
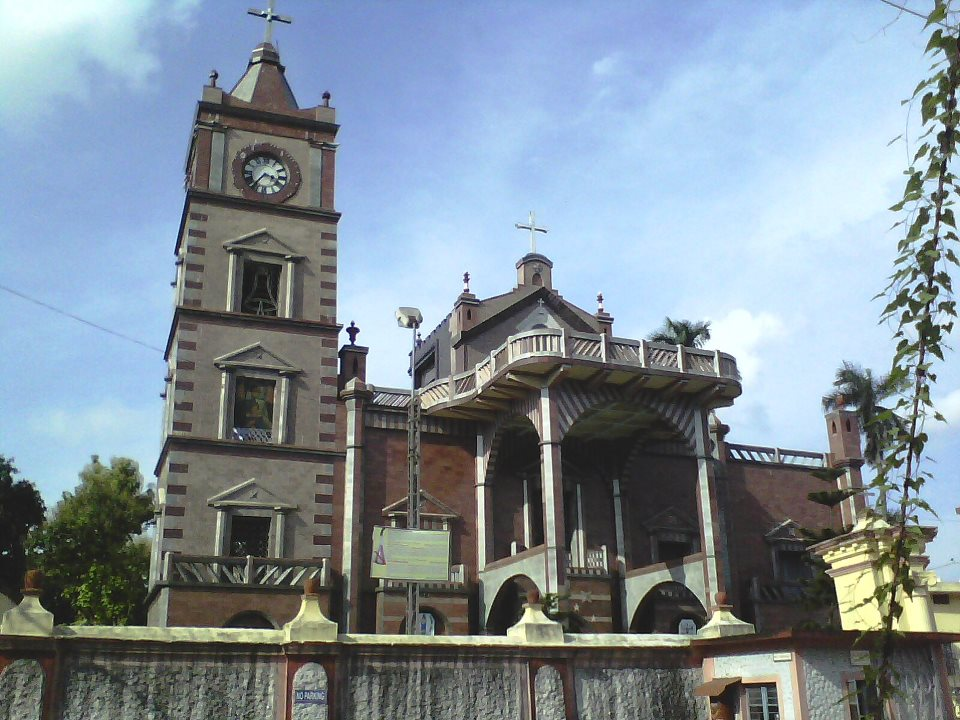
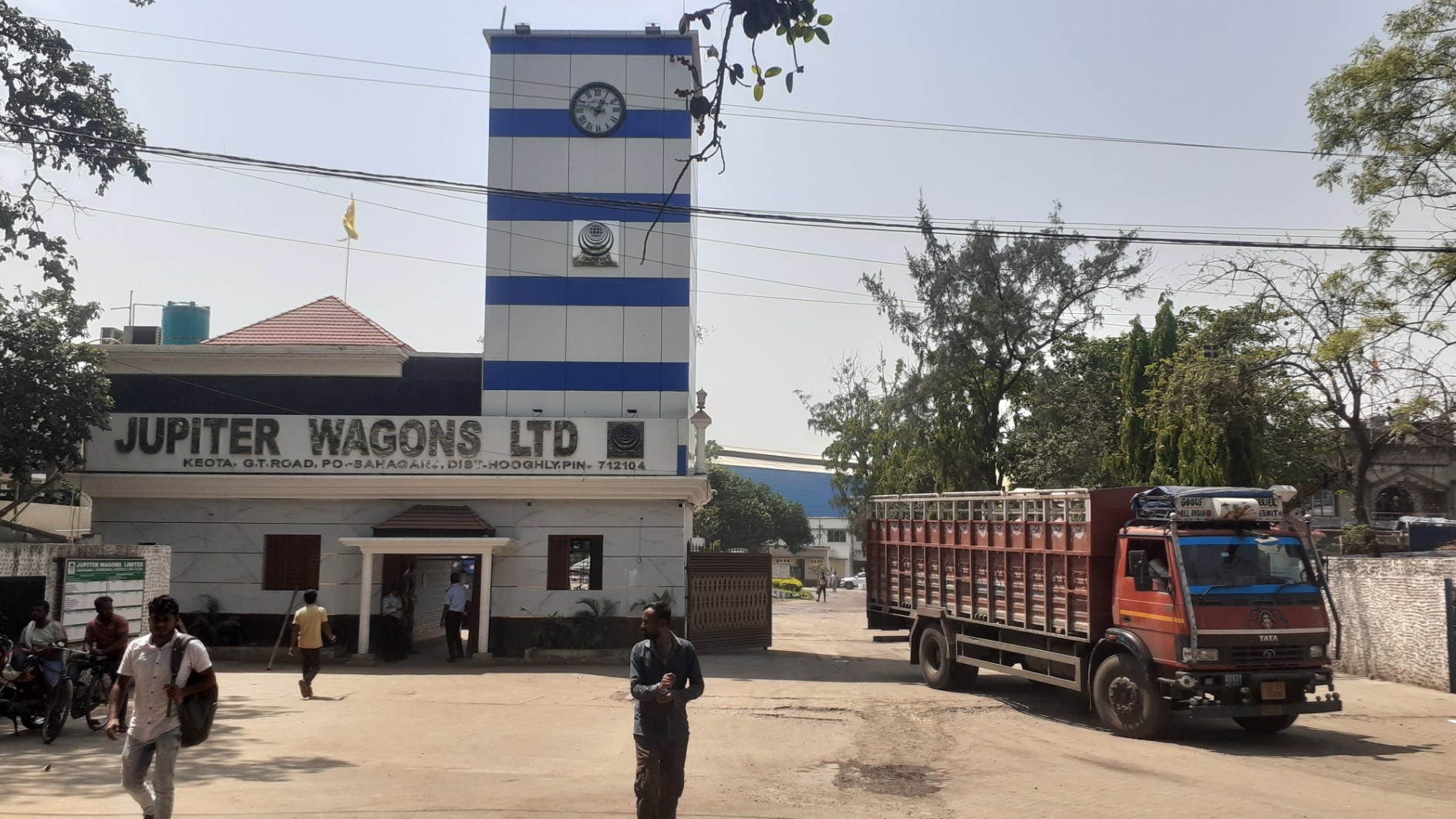
- The Bandel Church Jupiter Wagons Ltd Bandel
- Nickname: Portuguese city
- Location in West Bengal, India Bandel (India)
- Coordinates: 22.922743°N 88.379542°E
- Country: India
- State: West Bengal
- Division: Burdwan
- District: Hooghly
- Subdivision: Chinsurah
- Establishment by Portuguese: 1599
- Founder: Portuguese
- Named for: Derived from Bengali word "bandar" which means "port"

Government
  - Type: Municipality
  - Body: Hooghly Chinsurah Municipality
  - Chairman: Soumitra Ghosh

Area
  - Total: 20 km^{2} (7.7 sq mi)
  - Rank: 1st in Hooghly District
- Elevation: 16 m (52 ft)

Population (2011)
  - Total: 356,193
  - Rank: 1st in Hooghly district
  - Density: 18,000/km^{2} (46,000/sq mi)

Languages
  - Official: Bengali; English
- Time zone: UTC+5:30 (IST)
- PIN: 712123, 712103, 712104
- Telephone code: +91 33
- ISO 3166 code: IN-WB
- Vehicle registration: WB
- Lok Sabha constituency: Hooghly
- Vidhan Sabha constituency: Chunchura
- Member of Parliament: Rachana Banerjee (AITC)
- Member of Legislative Assembly (MLA): Subir Nag (BJP)
- Website: hooghly.nic.in

Bandel is a city in the Hooghly district of the Indian state of West Bengal. It was founded by Portuguese settlers and falls under the jurisdiction of Chandernagore Police Commissionerate. It is a part of the area covered by Kolkata Metropolitan Development Authority (KMDA). Bandel is a major rail junction station of Eastern Railway zone, and is 38 km from Howrah railway station. Sir James Brooke, the first White Rajah of the Kingdom of Sarawak was born here in 1803.

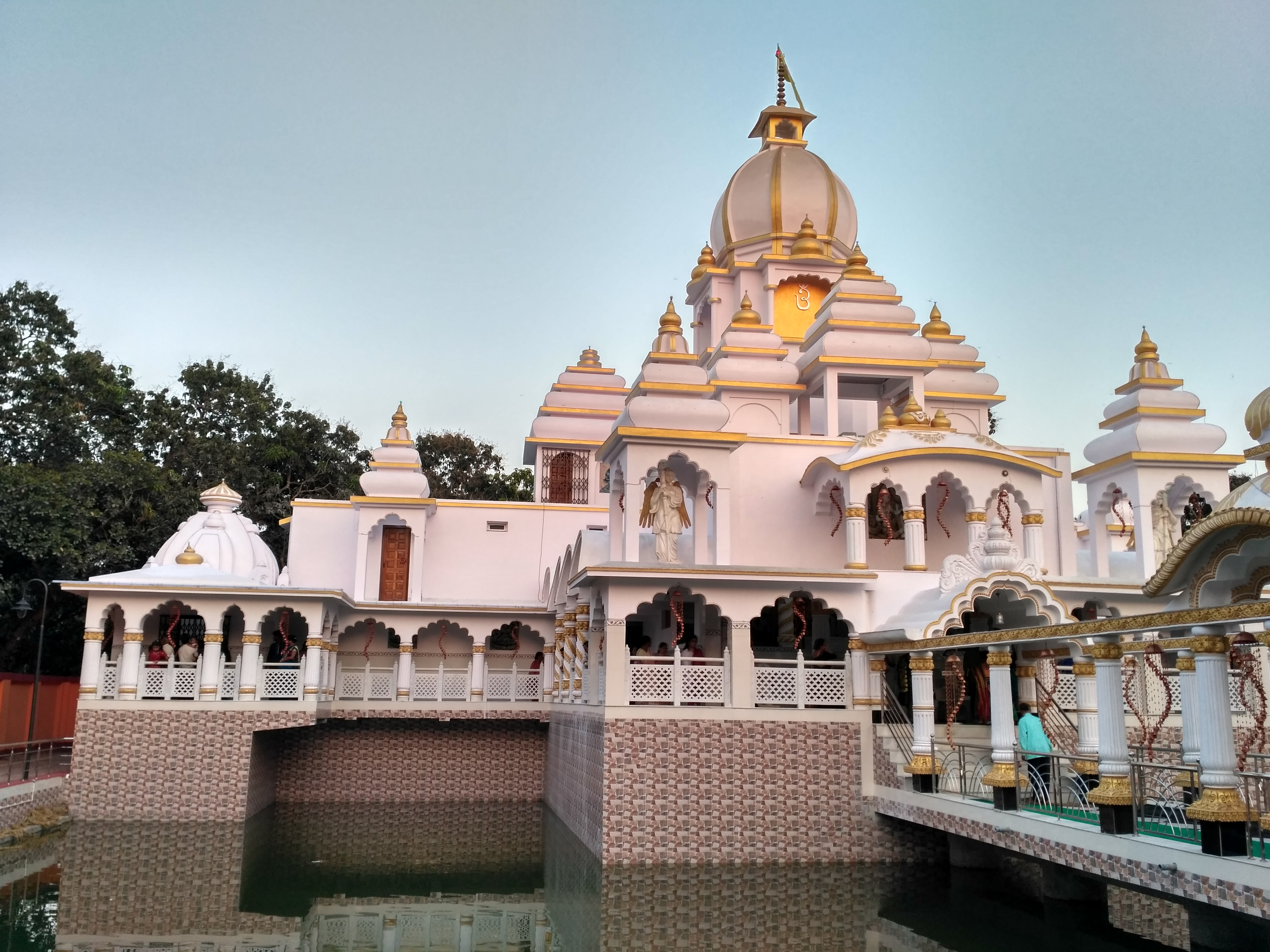
Lahiri Temple at Rajhat, Bandel

== Geography ==
=== Location ===
Bandel is located at 22°55′22″N 88°22′46″E and it has an elevation of 16 meter. The main river that flows by Bandel is Hooghly. The town is in Gangetic Plain.

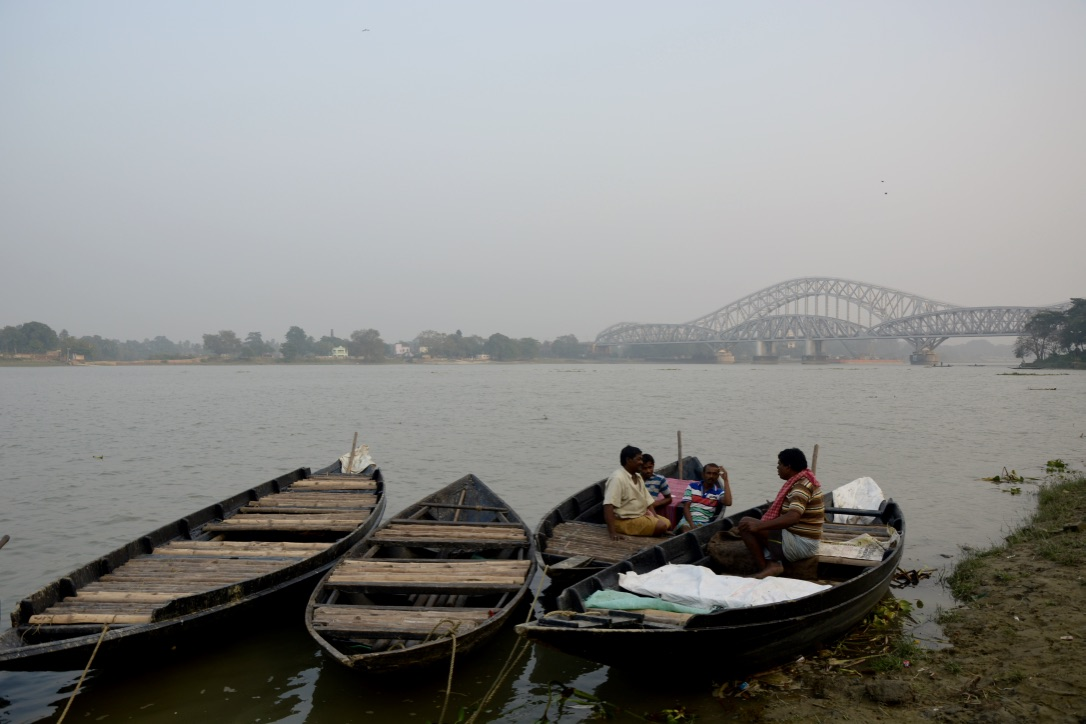
Boats waiting on Hooghly River near Bandel

=== Climate ===
Like the rest of the Ganges Delta of West Bengal, the climate is tropical wet-and-dry in nature. A prolonged hot and humid weather is the main characteristic of the climate of Bandel. The monsoon stays from early June to mid-September. Winter persists for almost three months, from mid-November to mid-February. The weather remains dry during the winter and humid during summer.

During the recent years, Bandel has been experiencing extremely high temperature with the maximum of 41 °C occurring in the month of May. The lowest temperature observed in 2024 is 16 °C in January. The summer season is usually observed first in April, but the high temperatures have once again, taken over. In 2025, temperature rise was observed as early as the beginning of February. Winter started in 2024 from the end of November. Low temperatures of winter are now no longer so high. In 2017, the lowest temperature of January was 13 °C, and over the next 4 years it has dropped to about 8.4 °C, a drop of 4.6°. And as for summer, the maximum temperatures have risen quite a bit. June is regarded as the hottest month of the year in Hooghly District with the temperature rising from 35 °C in 2017 to 37.1 °C in 2021, a rise of 2.1° followed by May.

The month of the highest rainfall is July, with more than 300 mm per year followed by August with more than 180 mm. The others with more than 80 mm are May, June, September and October.

Climate data for Bandel (Hooghly), 2017–2021
Month	Jan	Feb	Mar	Apr	May	Jun	Jul	Aug	Sep	Oct	Nov	Dec	Year
Mean daily maximum °C (°F)	26.8 (80.2)	32.8 (91.0)	34.9 (94.8)	35.6 (96.1)	36.1 (97.0)	37.1 (98.8)	35.4 (95.7)	33.6 (92.5)	35.0 (95.0)	35.4 (95.7)	32.4 (90.3)	27.7 (81.9)	33.6 (92.4)
Daily mean °C (°F)	16.3 (61.3)	22.8 (73.0)	27.7 (81.9)	28.7 (83.7)	29.8 (85.6)	30.1 (86.2)	28.9 (84.0)	29.1 (84.4)	29.0 (84.2)	27.1 (80.8)	23.6 (74.5)	18.6 (65.5)	26.0 (78.8)
Mean daily minimum °C (°F)	8.4 (47.1)	14.1 (57.4)	17.3 (63.1)	22.2 (72.0)	23.4 (74.1)	25.0 (77.0)	26.0 (78.8)	26.1 (79.0)	25.0 (77.0)	19.6 (67.3)	16.6 (61.9)	10.3 (50.5)	19.5 (67.1)
Average precipitation mm (inches)	5.82 (0.23)	18.02 (0.71)	25.02 (0.99)	45.34 (1.79)	156.84 (6.17)	206.40 (8.13)	310.96 (12.24)	251.9 (9.92)	189.44 (7.46)	123.44 (4.86)	22.42 (0.88)	40.14 (1.58)	1,395.74 (54.96)
Source: Directorate of Mines and Minerals

Climate data for Bandel (Hooghly), 2014–2018 (2014-2017 for temperature)
Month	Jan	Feb	Mar	Apr	May	Jun	Jul	Aug	Sep	Oct	Nov	Dec	Year
Mean maximum °C (°F)	24.00 (75.20)	28.25 (82.85)	33.00 (91.40)	37.00 (98.60)	37.00 (98.60)	35.00 (95.00)	32.75 (90.95)	33.00 (91.40)	33.25 (91.85)	32.00 (89.60)	28.25 (82.85)	24.75 (76.55)	37.00 (98.60)
Mean minimum °C (°F)	13.75 (56.75)	18.25 (64.85)	21.50 (70.70)	25.75 (78.35)	26.75 (80.15)	27.25 (81.05)	26.25 (79.25)	26.75 (80.15)	27.00 (80.60)	24.50 (76.10)	19.25 (66.65)	15.25 (59.45)	13.75 (56.75)
Average rainfall mm (inches)	2.60 (0.10)	18.00 (0.71)	21.60 (0.85)	40.20 (1.58)	93.20 (3.67)	198.80 (7.83)	383.60 (15.10)	262.60 (10.34)	202.20 (7.96)	80.00 (3.15)	12.20 (0.48)	11.60 (0.46)	1,326.6 (52.23)
Source: Bureau of Applied Economics and Statistics

== Economy ==
- Dunlop Factory: The famous Dunlop factory is situated at Sahaganj near Bandel. This factory was built by Dunlop India Limited (DIL) in 1936. It is the first tyre manufacturing plant in Asia. However, it has been shut down owing to some issues in its administration.
- BTPS: Bandel Thermal Power Station was started with a capacity of 82.5 MW in 1965. It has since been expanded and currently has a rated capacity of 530 MW. It is operated under the West Bengal Power Development Corporation (WBPDCL).
- Bakery: Bandel is the base of many bakery industries.
- Bandel Bazar: Bandel Bazar is one of the biggest and important markets of the district. It is the hub of agricultural import and export. Vegetables, fruits (especially mango, watermelon) and rice are exported from the market.
- Banks: At Bandel, there are branches of banks such as Allahabad Bank, Axis Bank, Bandhan Bank, Bank of Baroda, Canara Bank, Punjab & Sind Bank, State Bank of India, UCO Bank, and, HDFC Bank.
- Jupiter Wagons Ltd: Jupiter, an engineering company which manufactures railway based products such as Fright Wagons, Bogie & CMS Crossings, is located in front of Bandel ITI near Sahaganj.

== Transport ==
=== Train ===
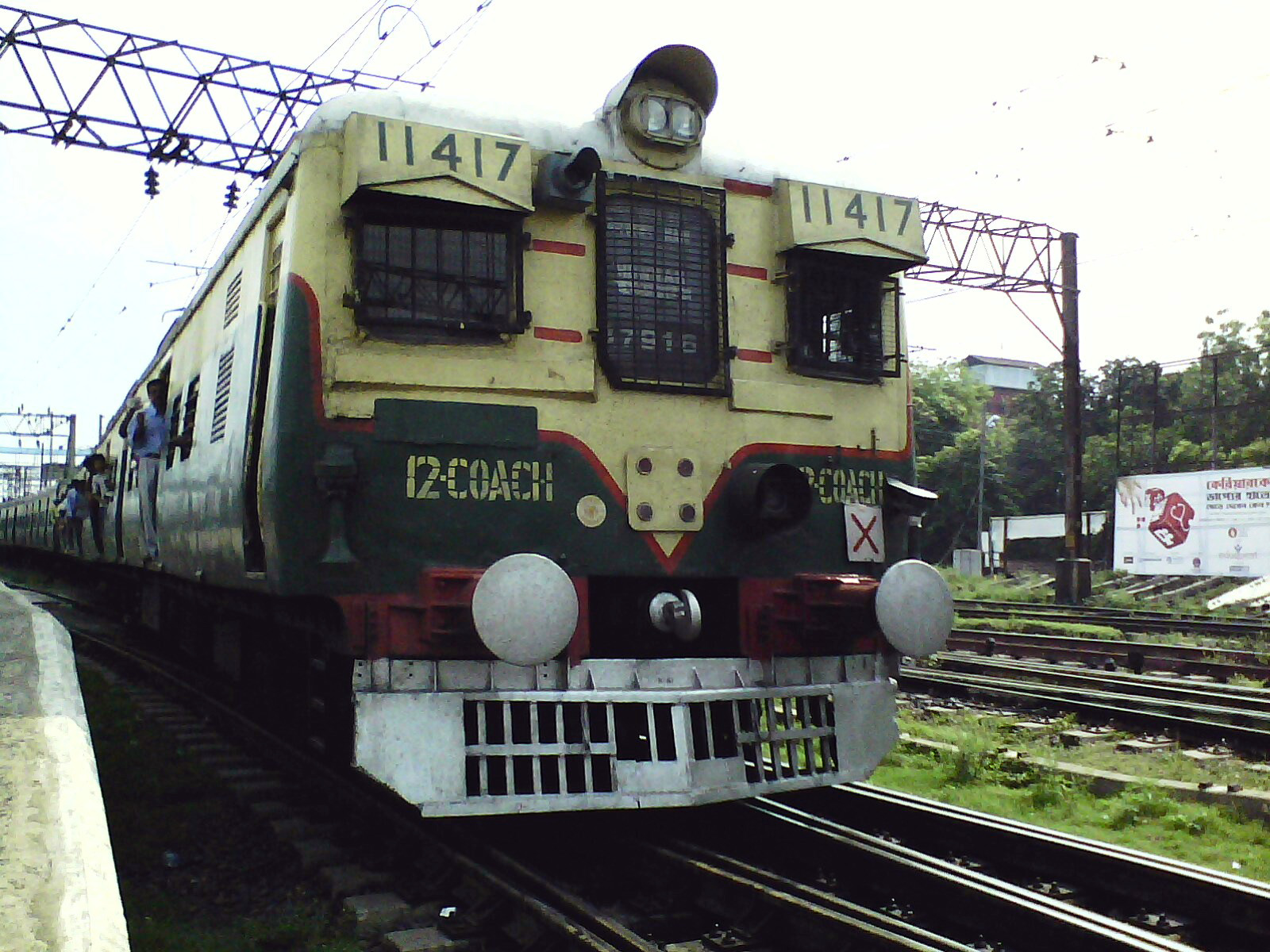
A local train leaving Bandel Junction

Bandel has its own railway junction. Bandel Junction is an important railway station of Eastern Railway and is a model rail station. Bandel junction has total of 7 platforms. The station is situated approximately 40 km from Howrah station on the Howrah–Bardhaman main line. The Bandel–Katwa line meets the Howrah main line, here at Bandel Jn. Another branch line connects Bandel with Sealdah railway station and Kolkata railway station via Naihati. An EMU car-shed, as well as a goods yard, is situated in the neighbourhood of Bandel station.

=== Road and bus ===
State Highway 6/Grand Trunk Road passes through Bandel. The Grand Trunk Road divides Keota and Sahaganj. It passes through the urban areas of the city. To the north, the road is divided into two parts because the flyover at Dunlop was not yet completed and its construction is halted. However, the flyover remained untouched for months. The flyover is said to start from Keota and end at the north part of Iswarbaha covering a distance of more than 1 km.

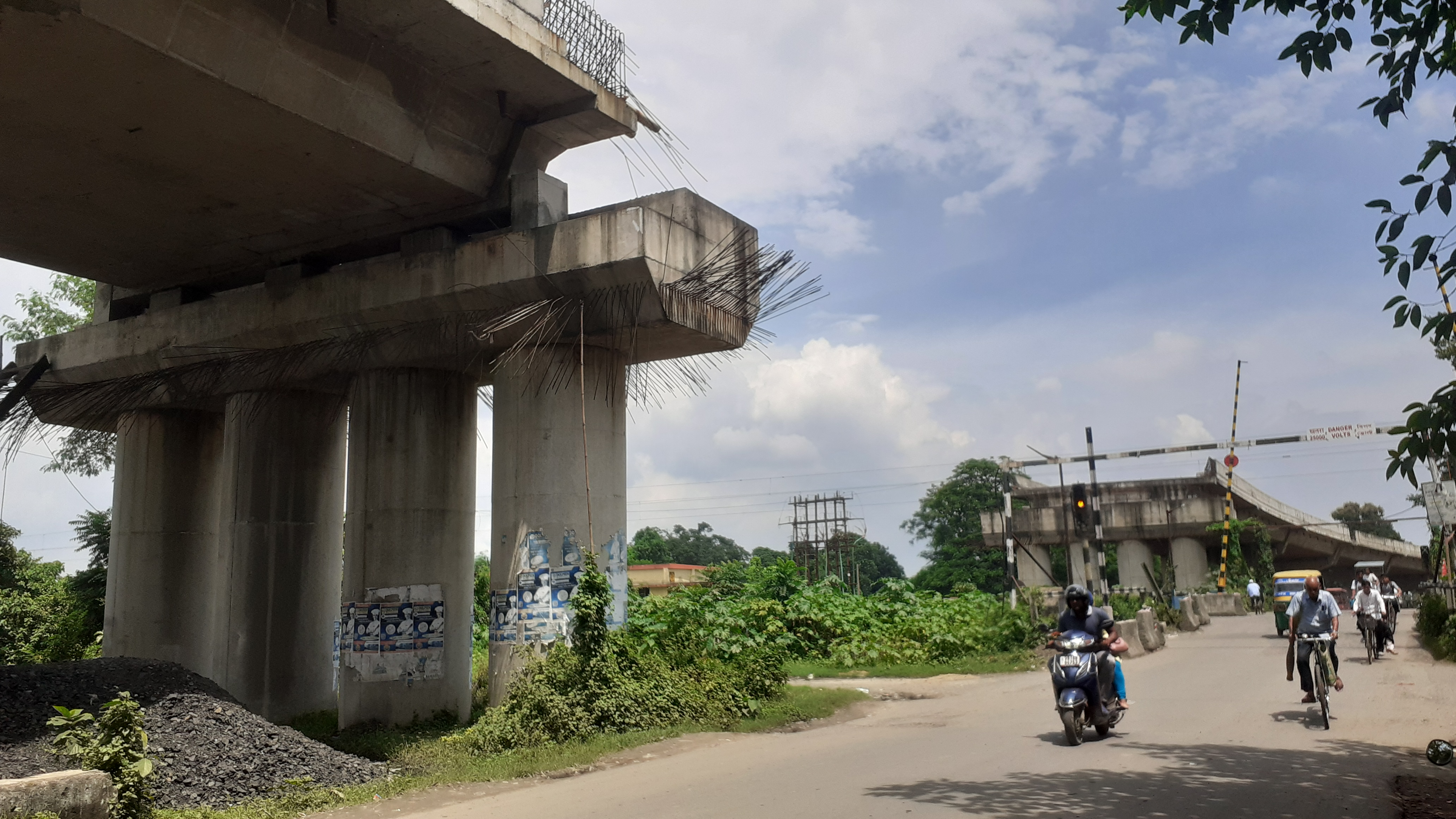
The incomplete flyover near Dunlop rail gate, dated 27 July 2025

Government taxis (cabs) and government buses are not found in Bandel like the rest of Hooghly district. This is simply because of the lack of major places to visit in the district and because railway services serve as the main transport method of the cities and towns. The nearest originating government buses are found in Naihati and the nearest originating government taxis are found in Howrah city before Bardhaman city.

==== Private bus ====
- 4 Chunchura Court - Memari
- 8 Chunchura Court - Kalna
- 23 Chunchura Court - Tarakeswar
- 17 Chinsurah to Tarakeswar

Auto rickshaws, e-rickshaws, and cycle-rickshaws all contribute to the public transport of Bandel.

=== Water ===
There is only one ferry ghat in Bandel, the Dunlop Ferry Ghat at Sahaganj. It is located beside the Dunlop Factory. Most ferries operate here between Halisahar and Sahaganj.

There are no bridges in Bandel. The closest rail bridge is Jubilee Bridge and Sampreeti Bridge (setu) in Chinsurah and the closest highway bridge is Ishwar Gupta Setu that serves the Barrackpore-Kalyani Expressway in Bansberia.

=== Air ===
The nearest airport to Bandel is the Netaji Subhas Chandra Bose International Airport in Dum Dum, Kolkata.

== Prominent places ==
=== Bandel Church ===
The most well known place in Bandel is the Bandel Church (Basilica of Holy Rosary, Bandel). Bandel Church is one of the oldest Christian Churches in West Bengal. It is located in the southern part of Sahaganj, Bandel. It was built by the Portuguese in 1599, dedicated to Nossa Senhora do Rosário (Mother Mary). It is a parish church and part of the Archdiocese of Calcutta. It is one of the most prominent historical landmarks in Hooghly district as well as West Bengal.

== Notable people ==
- Sarat Chandra Chattopadhyay, the legendary Indian Bengali novelist and short story writer was born in Debanandapur, Bandel.
- James Brooke, the first White Rajah and the founder of the Raj of Sarawak was born in Bandel.

== Festivals ==
Like other parts of West Bengal, Durga Puja is the biggest festival of Bandel. Kartik Puja is one of the famous festivals celebrated in Bandel (Sahaganj-Bansberia area). Lakshmi Puja, Kali Puja, Viswakarma Puja, Saraswati Puja, Poila Boisakh, Ganesh Puja, Chhath Puja, Dol Yatra are also widely celebrated at Bandel. Puja pandals are built in various places for many of the above festivals. Olaichandi Mela (fair) is the biggest fair observed at Bandel in early summer after the Dol Yatra. Christmas is well attended at Bandel Church. Eid is the major festival celebrated by the Muslim community of Bandel. Another festival, 'Sitala Puja' is exclusive to Bandel, which is celebrated few weeks after the Dol Yatra.

== Education ==
=== Schools ===
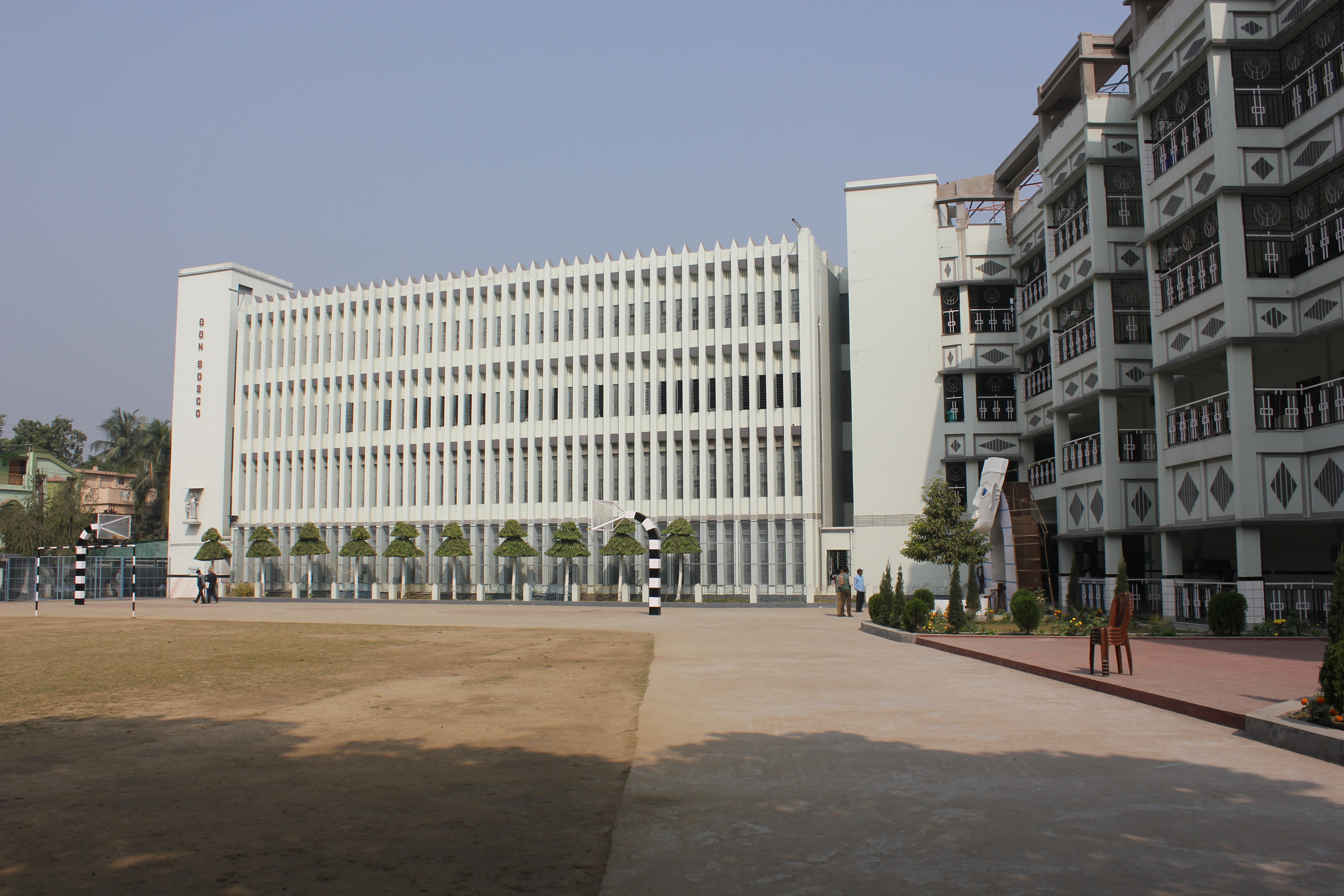
Don Bosco School Bandel

=== ICSE affiliated Schools ===
- Don Bosco School Bandel (established in 1978)
- Auxilium Convent School Bandel (established in 1954)
- Kendriya Vidyalaya Bandel (established in 2017)
- Kendriya Vidyalaya Bandel (New Building)
- Abbot Shishu Hall (established in 1979)
- Bandel St.John's High School (established in 1870)
- Hooghly Girls' High School (established in 1920)
- Blooming Buds School (established in 2 February 1989)
- Disha Public School
- Binodini Girls' High School Hooghly (established in 1928)
- Dunlop English Medium School (established in 1966)
- Bandel Vidyamandir High School (established in 1953)
- Elite Co-ed High School (established in 1998)
- Pearl Rosary School Bandel (established in 2018)
- Bandel Mahatma Gandhi Hindi Vidyalaya (established in 1956)
- Hooghly Branch High School (established in 1834)
- Ferrando Convent Bandel (established in 1995)
- Blossoms School Bandel
- Shyamsundarpur Primary School (established in 1974)
- Saraswati World School Bandel (established in 2017)

=== Engineering colleges ===
- Modern Institute of Engineering and Technology (established in 2010)
- West Bengal Survey Institute (established in 1947)
- Hooghly ITI, Sahaganj (Bandel) (established in 1961)
- Academy of Technology (established in 2003)

=== ICSE affiliated Schools ===
- Pearl Rosary School

== Places/divisions ==
Cities and towns in the Chinsurah subdivision (except Polba Dadpur and Dhaniakhali CD Blocks) in Hooghly district
M: municipal city/ town, CT: census town, R: rural/ urban centre,
Owing to space constraints in the small map, the actual locations in a larger map may vary slightly.

=== Debanandapur ===
Debanandapur is a village and gram panchayat in Bandel. It is the birthplace of the Bengali author Sarat Chandra Chattopadhyay and is about 3 km west from Bandel Station. His dwelling house is still there. There also is a library named Sarat Smrithi Pathagar, which includes a museum room containing the things used by the famous writer. The village has some 19th-century atchala temples. It is one of the seven important villages named Saptagram at the time of Mughals.

=== Manushpur ===
Manushpur is a census town in Chinsurah Mogra CD Block in Chinsurah subdivision of Hooghly district in the Indian state of West Bengal. It is located at 22.931389°N 88.374278°E. As per the 2011 Census of India, the place has a population of 8,148. Keota, Manushpur, Naldanga, Kodalia, Kulihanda, Dharmapur and Simla form a cluster of census towns on the eastern side of Hugli-Chuchura.

=== Kazidanga ===
Kazidanga is a village located to the west of Bandel Junction. The Saraswati river flows through the edge of Kazidanga. Kazidanga More is located in the middle of the place.

=== Kodalia ===
Kodalia is also a census town in Chinsurah Mogra CD Block in Chinsurah subdivision of Hooghly district in the Indian state of West Bengal. As per 2011 Census of India Kodalia had a total population of 8,994. It is located at 22.90724°N 88.379956°E. Keota, Manushpur, Naldanga, Kodalia, Kulihanda, Dharmapur and Simla form a cluster of census towns on the eastern side of Hugli-Chuchura.

Kodalia is located to the immediate south of Kazidanga as well as Bandel Junction. A large part of Kodalia has a vegetation cover. It is home to many places of worship. This mostly includes Hindu temples and Mosques. Like Kazidanga, the Saraswati river also flows through the edge of Kodalia.

=== Keota ===
Keota is probably the most economically important part/division of Bandel. It includes Bandel More, which is the most economically important place in Bandel. Most of the shops, restaurants, clothing places and many more are located in Bandel More. Keota and Sahaganj form the majority of Bandel's urban area and population. Keota's population in 2025 is approximately 27,300. A decent number of buildings are located at Keota. Keota also includes urban places. But not as much as Sahaganj.

=== Sahaganj ===
Sahaganj is the largest part/division of Bandel. It is also the only part of Bandel that is located beside the Hooghly River. It is 4 km from the Bandel station. It, along with Keota, form the majority of Bandel's urban area and population. Sahaganj's estimated population is about 90,000 as of 2020. The total area of Sahaganj is about 5.1 km^{2}. The highest number of accommodations, as well as buildings are located at Sahaganj. The Bandel Church, Don Bosco School Bandel, Auxilium Convent School Bandel and Bandel St.John's High School are all located in Sahaganj. A large number of schools, hotels and restaurants are located here as well. The postal code of Sahaganj is 712104.

The Hooghly River could be accessed via the Itkhola Ghat (locally called Chuni Miyar Ghat). Although the place is now closed because of unsafety in the ghat.

As for the economy, Sahaganj plays a big role for Bandel's economy. The Dunlop factory, the Jupiter Wagons Limited industry and the numerous shops and markets in the place contribute to the economy.

A unit of Dunlop India Ltd. is located here. Ruias purchased Dunlop India Ltd. from the Dubai-based Jumbo group owned by late Manu Chhabria. The postal code is 712104. and resumed production in January 2007 after eight years. After few months of starting production Ruias also stopped production again, till December 2012 there is no hope of light for the workers. Jupiter, an engineering company which manufacture railway based products such as Freight Wagons, Bogie & CMS Crossings, is located in front of Bandel ITI.

== Nearby places ==
=== Tribeni ===
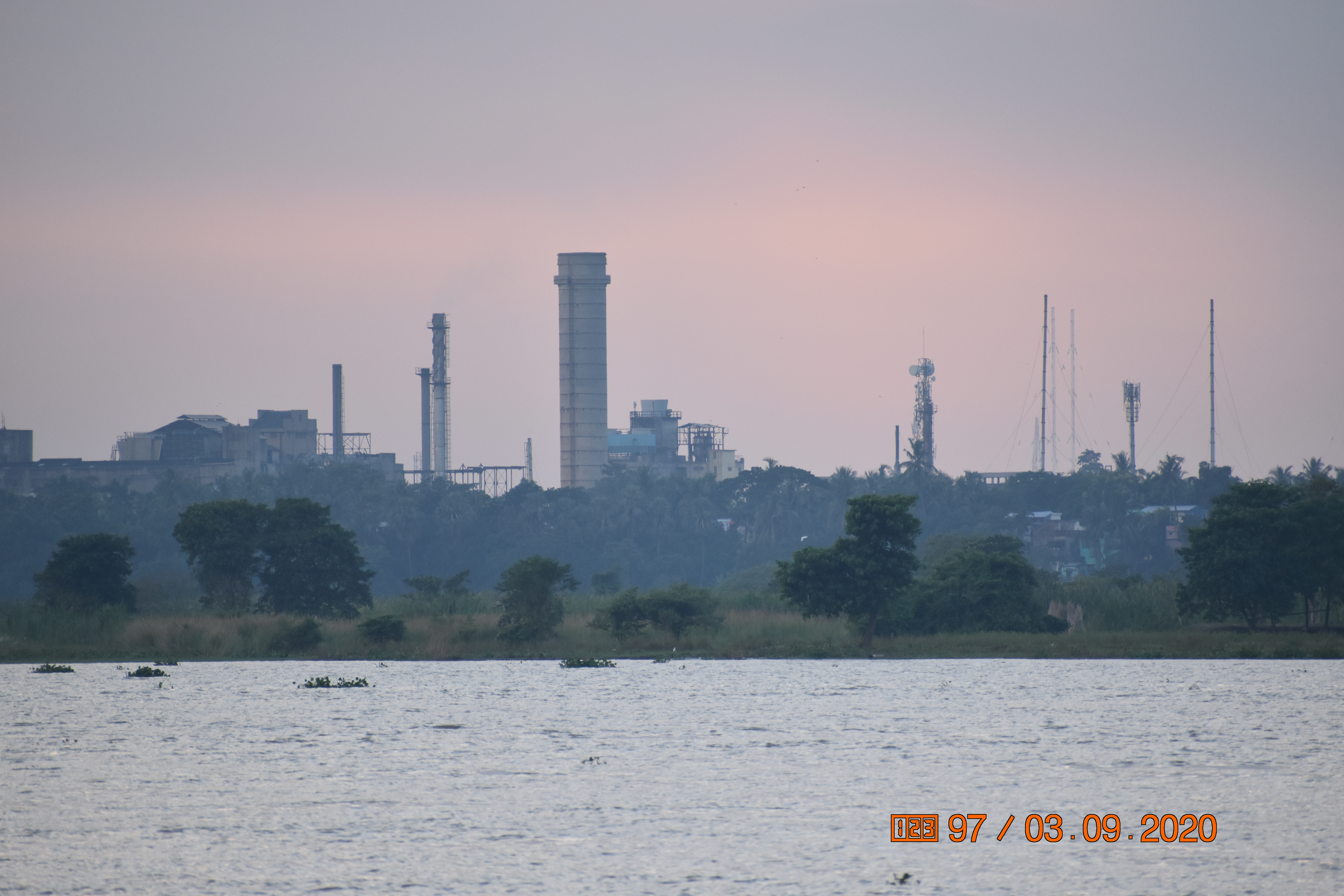
Bandel Thermal Power Station

Tribeni is 8 km from Bandel on the Bandel–Katwa line. Tribeni Tissues Limited, a specialty paper manufacturing company and a major supplier of tissue paper to the cigarette industry, is located at Tribeni. It was taken over by ITC in 1990. Tribeni in West Bengal is derived from the junction of three rivers – Hooghly (a branch of the Ganges), Kunti and Saraswati. The Tribeni Burning Ghat has Hindu religious values.

=== Other places ===
- Naihati - 1 km
- Mogra - 7 km
- Bansberia - 4 km
- Kalyani - 11 km
