= Bhadreswar, Hooghly =

Bhadreswar
- City
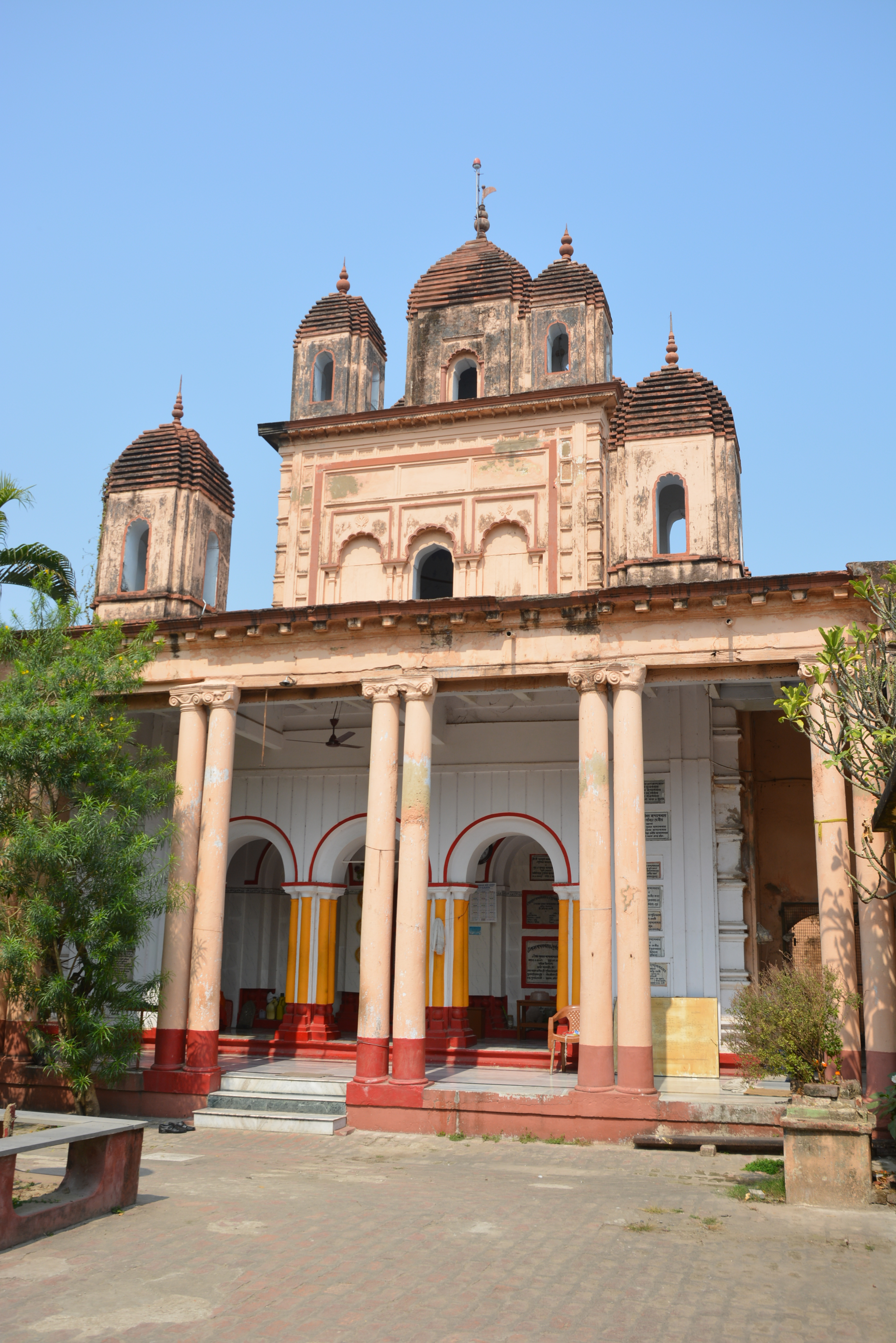
- Annapurna Mandir, Bhadreswar

- Location in West Bengal, India Bhadreswar (India)
- Coordinates: 22.82°N 88.35°E
- Country: India
- State: West Bengal
- Division: Burdwan
- District: Hooghly

Government
  - Type: Municipality
  - Body: Bhadreswar Municipality

Area
  - Total: 8.28 km^{2} (3.20 sq mi)
- Elevation: 2 m (6.6 ft)

Population (2011)
  - Total: 101,477
  - Density: 12,300/km^{2} (31,700/sq mi)

Languages
  - Official: Bengali, English
- Time zone: UTC+5:30 (IST)
- PIN: 712124
- Telephone code: +91 33
- Vehicle registration: WB
- Lok Sabha constituency: Hooghly
- Member of Parliament: Rachana Banerjee (AITC)
- Vidhan Sabha constituency: Chandannagar

Bhadreswar /bəˈdrɛswər/ is a city and a municipality of Hooghly district in the Indian state of West Bengal. It is a part of the area covered by Kolkata Metropolitan Development Authority (KMDA).

== Geography ==
Cities and towns in the Chandannagore subdivision and Polba Dadpur and Dhaniakhali CD Blocks of Chinsurah subdivision in Hooghly district
M: municipal corporation/ municipal city/ town, CT: census town, R: rural/ urban centre,
Owing to space constraints in the small map, the actual locations in a larger map may vary slightly

=== Location ===
Bhadreswar is located at 22.82°N 88.35°E. It has an average elevation of 2 metres (6 feet). It is situated by the Hooghly River. It is one of the beautiful places in Hooghly district.

=== Police station ===
Bhadreswar police station has jurisdiction over Bhadreswar and Champdani municipal areas and parts of Singur CD Block.

=== Urbanisation ===
In Chandannagore subdivision, 58.52% of the population is rural and the urban population is 41.48%. Chandannagore subdivision has 1 municipal corporation, 3 municipalities and 7 census towns. The single municipal corporation is Chandernagore Municipal Corporation. The municipalities are Tarakeswar Municipality, Bhadreswar Municipality and Champdany Municipality. Of the three CD Blocks in Chandannagore subdivision, Tarakeswar CD Block is wholly rural, Haripal CD Block is predominantly rural with just 1 census town, and Singur CD Block is slightly less rural with 6 census towns. Polba Dadpur and Dhaniakhali CD Blocks of Chinsurah subdivision (included in the map alongside) are wholly rural. The municipal areas are industrialised. All places marked in the map are linked in the larger full screen map.

== Demographics ==
=== Population ===
Historical population
Year	Pop.	±%
1901	15,150	—
1911	24,353	+60.7%
1921	22,081	−9.3%
1931	22,992	+4.1%
1941	27,673	+20.4%
1951	36,292	+31.1%
1961	35,489	−2.2%
1971	45,586	+28.5%
1981	58,858	+29.1%
1991	72,474	+23.1%
2001	106,071	+46.4%
2011	101,477	−4.3%
Source: Government of India

Hinduism	82,57%
Islam	17.17%
Christianity	0.05%
Buddhism	0.02%
Sikhism	0.01%
Jainism	0.01%
Others	0.18%
Religions in Burari (2011)

As per 2011 Census of India, Bhadreswar had a total population of 101,477 of which 53,330 (53%) were males and 48,147 (47%) were females. Population below 6 years was 9,580. The total number of literates in Bhadreswar was 79,498 (86.51% of the population over 6 years).

As of 2001 India census, Bhadreswar had a population of 105,944. Males constitute 55% of the population and females 45%. Bhadreswar has an average literacy rate of 74%, higher than the national average of 59.5%, with 59% of the males and 41% of the females literate. 10% of the population is under 6 years of age.

=== Languages ===
Languages spoken in Bhadreswar city (2011)
1. Bengali (51.7%)
2. Hindi (26.8%)
3. Urdu (15.8%)
4. Odia (3.82%)
5. Telugu (0.92%)
6. Others (0.84%)

=== Migrants ===
Jute mills drew in a large labour force from the neighbouring states of Bihar and Orissa, as well as eastern Uttar Pradesh, quite often forming an overwhelming majority of the population in the area, living in shanty towns and bustees dotting the mill area. The proportion of migrants in the population was 80% in Bhadreswar.

According to a study carried out by Vidyasagar University, "Most of these industrial units were located in riverine towns. A few of these were old towns inhabited previously by middle class Bengali 'babus' while others were new towns grown out of agricultural lands... Agriculture in Bengal was more remunerative than work in the jute mills but what the jute mills paid was enough to attract labour from Bihar, Orissa, U.P. first and then from C.P. or even Madras...The industrial 'mohallas' remained as 'ghettos'. There was little or no interconnection or social and cultural contact between local Bengali population and the mill hands. Both lived in their own worlds."

=== Kolkata Urban Agglomeration ===
The following Municipalities and Census Towns in Hooghly district were part of Kolkata Urban Agglomeration in the 2011 census: Bansberia (M), Hugli-Chinsurah (M), Bara Khejuria (Out Growth), Shankhanagar (CT), Amodghata (CT), Chak Bansberia (CT), Naldanga (CT), Kodalia (CT), Kulihanda (CT), Simla (CT), Dharmapur (CT), Bhadreswar (M), Champdani (M), Chandannagar (M Corp.), Baidyabati (M), Serampore (M), Rishra (M), Rishra (CT), Bamunari (CT), Dakshin Rajyadharpur (CT), Nabagram Colony (CT), Konnagar (M), Uttarpara Kotrung (M), Raghunathpur (PS-Dankuni) (CT), Kanaipur (CT) and Keota (CT).

== Economy ==
=== Industry ===
Victoria Jute Mills at Telenipara, Bhadreswar was established in 1885 and employs about 5,000 people. The mill is passing through a rough phase, closing down and opening off and on with militant labour in a volatile environment.

== Transport ==
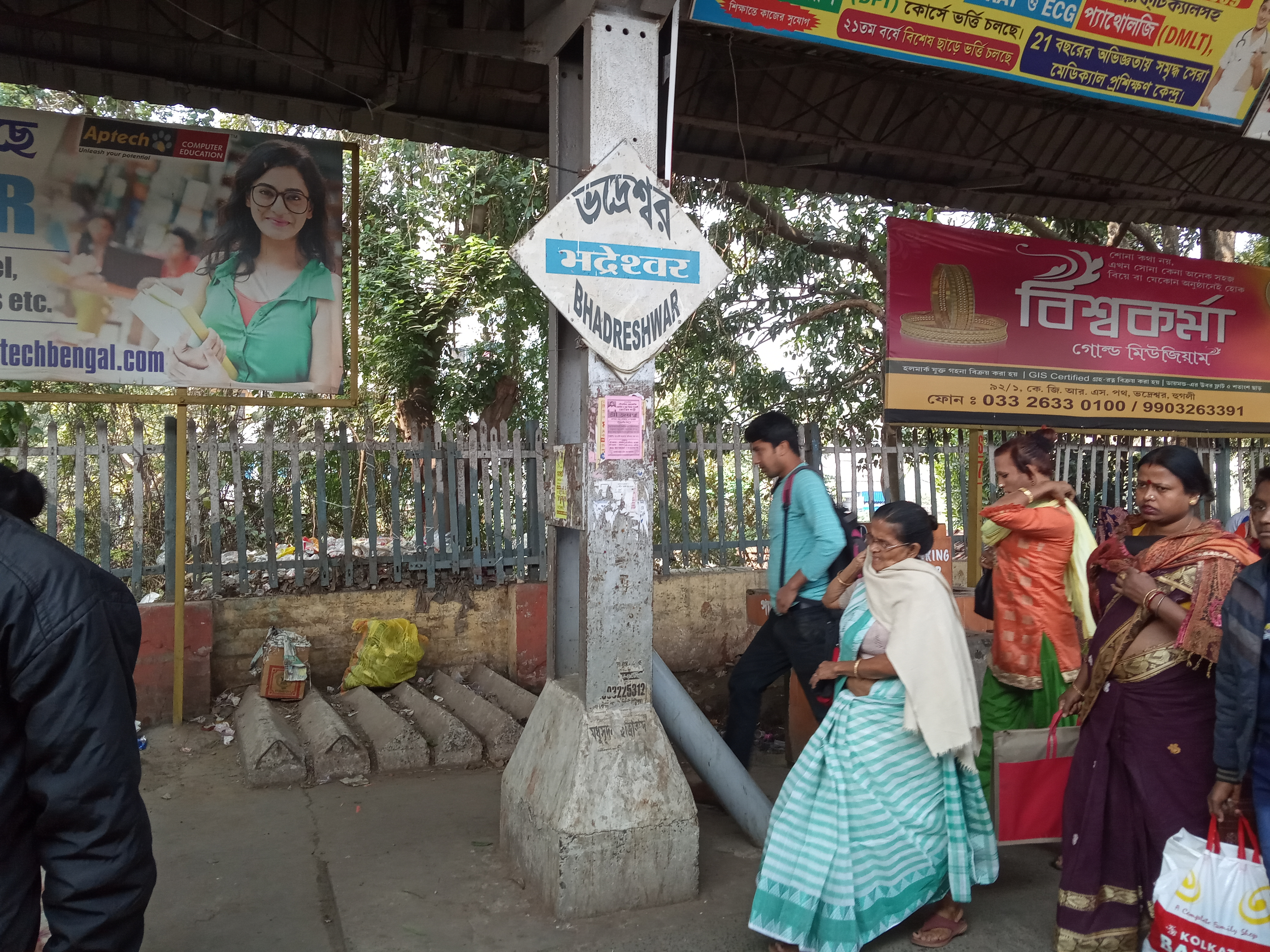
Bhadreshwar railway station

State Highway 6 (West Bengal)/ Grand Trunk Road passes through Bhadreswar. Private Bus number 2 (Chunchura Court - Dakshineswar) plies through here.

Bhadreswar railway station is on the Howrah-Bardhaman main line. It is part of the Kolkata Suburban Railway system.

== Education ==
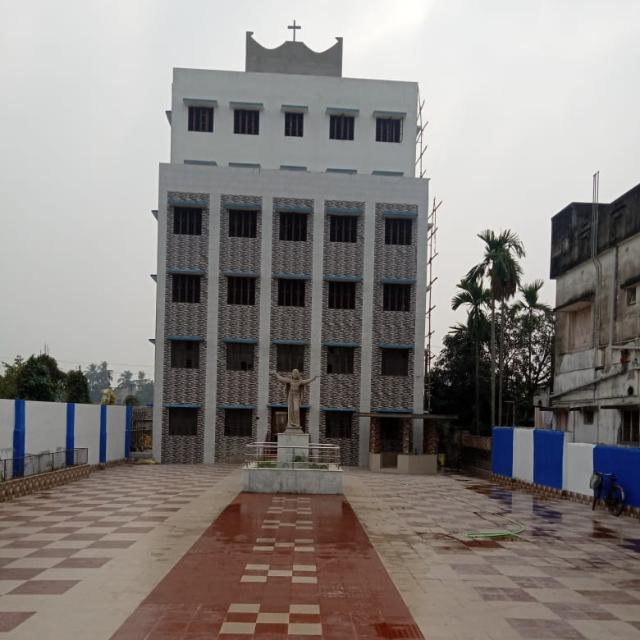
Pearl Rosary School

=== College ===
- Kabi Sukanta Mahavidyalaya, a general degree college, was established at Bhadreswar in 1986.

=== Schools ===
- Telinipara Bhadreswar High School
- Digra Mallickhati Deshbandhu Vidyapith
- Saradapally Kanya Vidyapith
- Dharmatala Girls High School
- Pearl Rosary School
- Durgamoyee Academy
- Dreamland school
- Bholanath memorial school
- Little Angel school
- Ravindra Smriti (S) Vidyaniketan

== Tourist Spot ==
1. Banabithi Park located near the DVC channel
2. Bhadreswar Nath Temple located near Bhadreswar G.T. Road.
3. Bhadreswar Ganga River Ghat
4. Charcikatala in Bighati
5. Tetul Tala Jagadharti maa (also known as Burima)
