= Kanaipur =

- Census Town
- Location in West Bengal, India Kanaipur (India)
- Coordinates: 22.703482°N 88.327317°E
- Country: India
- State: West Bengal
- District: Hooghly

Population (2011)
  - Total: 26,814

Languages
  - Official: Bengali, English
- Time zone: UTC+5:30 (IST)
- ISO 3166 code: IN-WB
- Vehicle registration: WB
- Website: wb.gov.in

Kanaipur is a census town in Sreerampur Uttarpara CD Block in Srirampore subdivision of Hooghly district in the Indian state of West Bengal.

== Geography ==
Cities and towns in the Sreerampur Uttarpara CD Block in Srirampore subdivision in Hooghly district
M: municipal city/ town, CT: census town,
Owing to space constraints in the small map, the actual locations in a larger map may vary slightly

=== Location ===
Kanaipur is located at 22.703482°N 88.327317°E.

Rishra (CT), Bamunari, Nawapara, Nabagram Colony, Kanaipur, Basai and Raghunathpur (PS-Dankuni) form a cluster of census towns on the eastern side of the series of statutory towns/ cities – Rishra, Konnagar and Uttarpara.

=== Urbanisation ===
Srirampore subdivision is the most urbanized of the subdivisions in Hooghly district. 73.13% of the population in the subdivision is urban and 26.88% is rural. The subdivision has 6 municipalities and 34 census towns. The municipalities are: Uttarpara Kotrung Municipality, Konnagar Municipality, Serampore Municipality, Baidyabati Municipality, Rishra Municipality and Dankuni Municipality. Amongst the CD Blocks in the subdivision, Uttarapara Serampore (census towns shown in the map alongside) had 76% urban population, Chanditala I 42%, Chanditala II 69% and Jangipara 7% (census towns in the last 3 CD Blocks are shown in a separate map). All places marked in the map are linked in the larger full screen map.

== Demographics ==
As per 2011 Census of India, Kanaipur had a total population of 26,814 of which 13,914 (52%) were males and 12,900 (48%) were females. Population below 6 years was 2,592. The total number of literates in Kanaipur was 21,691 (89.55% of the population over 6 years).

As of 2001 India census, Kanaipur had a population of 6,298. Males constitute 51% of the population and females 49%. Kanaipur has an average literacy rate of 81%, higher than the national average of 59.5%: male literacy is 84%, and female literacy is 79%. In Kanaipur, 10% of the population is under 6 years of age.

=== Kolkata Urban Agglomeration ===
The following Municipalities and Census Towns in Hooghly district were part of Kolkata Urban Agglomeration in 2011 census: Bansberia (M), Hugli-Chinsurah (M), Bara Khejuria (Out Growth), Shankhanagar (CT), Amodghata (CT), Chak Bansberia (CT), Naldanga (CT), Kodalia (CT), Kulihanda (CT), Simla (CT), Dharmapur (CT), Bhadreswar (M), Champdani (M), Chandannagar (M Corp.), Baidyabati (M), Serampore (M), Rishra (M), Rishra (CT), Bamunari (CT), Dakshin Rajyadharpur (CT), Nabagram Colony (CT), Konnagar (M), Uttarpara Kotrung (M), Raghunathpur (PS-Dankuni) (CT), Kanaipur (CT) and Keota (CT).

== Healthcare ==
Kanaipur Rural Hospital functions with 30 beds.

== Transport ==
Konnagar railway station on the Howrah-Bardhaman main line is the nearest railway station.
