= Serampore Uttarpara =

Serampore Uttarpara Sreerampur Uttarpara
- Community development block
- Interactive map of Serampore Uttarpara
- Coordinates: 22.7051367°N 88.3353567°E
- Country: India
- State: West Bengal
- District: Hooghly

Government
  - Type: Representative democracy

Area
  - Total: 44.80 km^{2} (17.30 sq mi)

Population (2011)
  - Total: 152,266
  - Density: 3,399/km^{2} (8,803/sq mi)

Languages
  - Official: Bengali, English
- Time zone: UTC+5:30 (IST)
- PIN: 712248 (Rishra); 712234 (Kanaipur); 712247 (Raghunathpur); 712246 (Nabagram); 712233 (Hindmotor)
- Telephone/STD code: 033
- Vehicle registration: WB 15, WB 16, WB 18
- Literacy: 86.68%
- Lok Sabha constituency: Sreerampur
- Vidhan Sabha constituency: Sreerampur, Uttarapara
- Website: hooghly.gov.in

Sreerampur Uttarpara is a community development block that forms an administrative division in Srirampore subdivision of Hooghly district in the Indian state of West Bengal.

== Overview ==
The Sreerampur Uttarpara CD Block is part of the Hooghly Flats, one of the three natural regions in the district of the flat alluvial plains, that forms part of the Gangetic Delta. The region is a narrow strip of land along the 80 km long stretch of the Hooghly River, that forms the eastern boundary of the district. The region has been physiographically influenced by the course of the river. The Hooghly is a tidal river and has a high west bank. The Portuguese, the Dutch, the French, the Danes and the British dominated industry, trade and commerce in this area for more than two centuries, and as a result this belt is highly industrialised.

== Geography ==
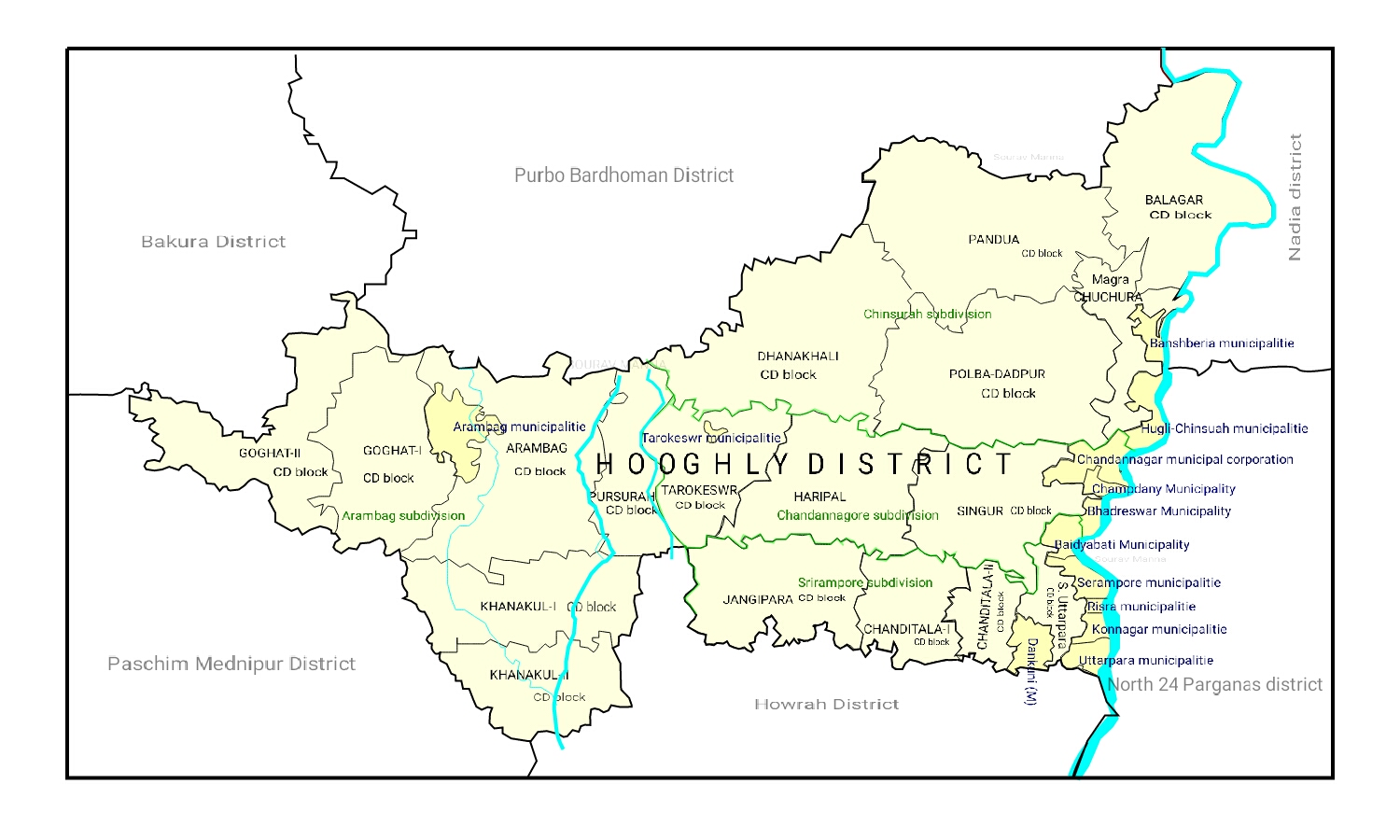
Map of Hooghly district showing CD blocks and municipal areas

Nabagram, a constituent panchayat of Sreerampur-Uttarpara block, is located at 22°42′18″N 88°20′07″E.

Sreerampur Uttarpara CD Block is bounded by Baidyabati Municipality in the north, Serampore Municipality, Rishra Municipality, Konnagar Municipality, Uttarpara Kotrung Municipality, Barrackpore II CD Block in North 24 Parganas district, across the Hooghly, in the east, Bally Jagachha CD Block, in Howrah district, in the south and Chanditala II, Singur and Polba Dadpur CD Blocks in the west.

It is located 29 km from Chinsurah, the district headquarters.

Sreerampur Uttarpara CD Block has an area of 44.8 km^{2}. It has 1 panchayat samity, 6 gram panchayats, 117 gram sansads (village councils), 19 mouzas and 13 inhabited villages. Serampore, Dankuni and Uttarpara police stations serve this block. Headquarters of this CD Block is at Serampore.

Map Of Sreerampur Uttarpara CD block

Gram panchayats of Sreerampur-Uttarpara block/ panchayat samiti are: Kanaipur, Nabagram, Pearapur, Raghunathpur, Rajyadharpur and Rishra.

== Demographics ==
=== Population ===
As per the 2011 Census of India, Serampur Uttarpara CD Block had a total population of 152,266, of which 36,389 were rural and 115,877 were urban. There were 77,725 (51%) males and 74,541 (49%) females. Population below 6 years was 13,794. Scheduled Castes numbered 35,086 (23.04%) and Scheduled Tribes numbered 1,246 (0.82%).

As per the 2001 census, Sreerampur-Uttarpara block had a total population of 126,337, out of which 65,277 were males and 61,060 were females. Sreerampur-Uttarpara block registered a population growth of -3.26% during the 1991-2001 decade. Decadal growth for Hooghly district was 15.72%. Decadal growth in West Bengal was 17.84%.

Census Towns in Sreerampur Uttarpara CD Block are (2011 census figures in brackets): Belumilki (10,998), Dakshin Rajyadharpur (11,254), Rishra (CT) (16,504), Bamunari (6,266), Nawapara (7,262), Nabagram Colony (18,358), Basai (8,772), Kanaipur (26,814) and Raghunathpur (9,650).

Large villages (with 4,000+ population) in Sreerampur Uttarpara CD Block are (2011 census figures in brackets): Piarapur (4,167), Ghoramara (4,284) and Mollarber (6,006).

Other villages in Sreerampur Uttarpara CD Block are (2011 census figures in brackets): Chapsara (1,435), Uttar Rajyadharpur (1,634), Pandit Satghara (3.087), Simla (3,164), Madpur (815), Bangihati (3,660), Basipota (958), Bhadua (2,236), Mirpur (3,056) and Jagannathpur (1,887).

=== Literacy ===
As per the 2011 census, the total number of literates in Sreerampur Uttarpara CD Block was 120,032 (86.68% of the population over 6 years) out of which males numbered 64,513 (91.21% of the male population over 6 years) and females numbered 56,419 (83.28% of the female population over 6 years). The gender disparity (the difference between female and male literacy rates) was 7.93%.

As per the 2001 census, Sreerampur-Uttarpara block had a total literacy of 68.09 per cent. While male literacy was 83.84 per cent, female literacy was 69.91 per cent.

See also – List of West Bengal districts ranked by literacy rate

Literacy in CD blocks of
Hooghly district
Arambagh subdivision
Arambagh – 79.10
Khanakul I – 77.73
Khanakul II – 79.16
Goghat I – 78.70
Goghat II – 77.24
Pursurah – 82.12
Chandannagar subdivision
Haripal – 78.59
Singur – 84.01
Tarakeswar – 79.96
Chinsurah subdivision
Balagarh – 76.94
Chinsurah Mogra – 83.01
Dhaniakhali – 75.66
Pandua – 75.86
Polba Dadpur – 75.14
Srirampore subdivision
Chanditala I – 83.76
Chanditala II – 84.78
Jangipara – 75.34
Sreerampur Uttarpara – 87.33
Source: 2011 Census: CD Block Wise
Primary Census Abstract Data

=== Language and religion ===
Religion in Sreerampur Uttarpara CD block (2011)
Hinduism	90.14%
Islam	9.10%
Buddhism	0.41%
Other or not stated	0.35%

As per the 2011 census, majority of the population of the district belong to the Hindu community with a population share of 82.9% followed by Muslims at 15.8%. The percentage of the Hindu population of the district has followed a decreasing trend from 87.1% in 1961 to 82.9% in the latest census 2011. On the other hand, the percentage of Muslim population has increased from 12.7% in 1961 to 15.8% in 2011 census.

In 2011 census Hindus numbered 137,245 and formed 90.14% of the population in Sreerampur Uttarpara CD Block. Muslims numbered 13,863 and formed 9.10% of the population. Others numbered 1,158 and formed 0.76% of the population.

Languages of Sreerampur Uttarpara block (2011)
1. Bengali (86.4%)
2. Hindi (12.4%)
3. Others (1.14%)

At the time of the 2011 census, 86.42% of the population spoke Bengali and 12.44% Hindi as their first language.

== Administration ==
=== Zilla Parishad ===
Serampore–Uttarpara CD Block has 3 Zilla Parishad seats. The latest elections were held in July 2023 where the Trinamool Congress won all 3 seats.

Zilla Parishad	ZP No.	Councillor	Party	Remarks
Serampore–Uttarpara	1	Dipti Bhattacharjee	Trinamool Congress	
Serampore–Uttarpara	2	Nikhil Chakraborty	Trinamool Congress	
Serampore–Uttarpara	3	Priyanka Dey	Trinamool Congress	

=== Panchayat Samiti ===
Serampore–Uttarpara Panchayat Samiti has 17 divisions. The latest elections were held in July 2023 where the Trinamool Congress won a landslide victory, winning 15 divisions with 1 division each was won by the BJP and the CPI(M).

Chairperson: Moni Manna Samui
Deputy Chairperson: Indranath Chakraborty
Gram Panchayat	No.	Councillor	Party	Remarks
Kanaipur	1	Shyamali Das	Trinamool Congress	
Kanaipur	2	Koushik Das	Trinamool Congress	
Kanaipur	3	Yuthika Singh	Bharatiya Janata Party	
Nabagram	4	Subhamoy Bhattacharya	Communist Party of India (Marxist)	
Nabagram	5	Moumita Guharay	Trinamool Congress	
Nabagram	6	Prabhat Kumar Roy Chowdhury	Trinamool Congress	
Raghunathpur	7	Sabita Das Ghosh	Trinamool Congress	
Raghunathpur	8	Subhas Chandra Rong	Trinamool Congress	
Rajyadharpur	9	Supriya Roy	Trinamool Congress	
Rajyadharpur	10	Sulekha Das	Trinamool Congress	
Rajyadharpur	11	Indranath Chakraborty	Trinamool Congress	
Rishra	12	Biraj Molla	Trinamool Congress	
Rishra	13	Kabita Mondal	Trinamool Congress	
Rishra	14	Tripti Karmakar	Trinamool Congress	
Pearapur	15	Bikash Das	Trinamool Congress	
Pearapur	16	Dipen Mondal	Trinamool Congress	
Pearapur	17	Moni Manna Samui	Trinamool Congress	

=== Gram Panchayats ===
Serampore–Uttarpara Panchayat Samiti has 6 villages or gram panchayats. The latest elections were held in July 2023 where the Trinamool Congress won all the 10 villages.

No.	Gram Panchayat	Total Seats							Majority
No.	Gram Panchayat	Total Seats	AITC	BJP	SDA			Others	Majority
No.	Gram Panchayat	Total Seats	AITC	BJP	CPI(M)	INC	ISF	Others	Majority
1	Kanaipur	30	14	8	5	0		3	AITC
2	Nabagram	19	10	0	9	0		0	AITC
3	Raghunathpur	10	6	2	2	0		0	AITC
4	Rajyadharpur	25	22	0	1	2	0	0	AITC
5	Rishra	30	20	3	3	0	3	1	AITC
6	Pearapur	18	17	1	0			0	AITC
Total		132	89	14	20	2	3	4	

== Rural poverty ==
As per poverty estimates obtained from household survey for families living below poverty line in 2005, rural poverty in Sreerampur Uttarpara CD Block was 7.59%.

== Economy ==
=== Livelihood ===
Livelihood
in Sreerampur Uttarpara CD Block
1. Cultivators (2.41%)
2. Agricultural labourers (3.57%)
3. Household industries (4.94%)
4. Other Workers (89.1%)

In Sreerampur Uttarpara CD Block in 2011, amongst the class of total workers, cultivators formed 2.41%, agricultural labourers 3.57%, household industry workers 4.94% and other workers 89.08%.

=== Infrastructure ===
There are 13 inhabited villages in Sreerampur Uttarpara CD Block. Amongst all the CD Blocks in Hooghly district Sreerampur Uttarpara CD Block has the lowest number of inhabited villages. 100% villages have power supply. 10 villages have more than one source of drinking water (tap, well, tube well, hand pump), 2 villages had only tube well/ borewell and 1 village had a hand pump only. Only 2 villages have sub post offices. All 13 villages have landlines, 12 villages have public call offices and 13 villages have mobile phone coverage. 10 villages have pucca roads and 10 villages have bus service (public/ private).

Important Handicrafts of Hooghly District
- Zari Work on Sari - Pandua, Pursurah, Jangipara, Tarakeswar and other blocks - 3,000 families involved
- Chikon Embroidery – Babnan, Pandua, Singur - 2,500 families involved
- Silk and Cotton Printing – Serampore (Chanditala) - 300 families involved
- Brass and Bell Metal – Manikpat, Goghat, Arambagh - 150 families involved
- Conch Shell – Pandua, Khanakul, Makla, Chandannagar
- Jute Diversified Product – Baidyabati, Mogra
- Terracota – Chinsurah, Chandannagar, Baidyabati, Mogra

Source:District Human Development Report 2010: Hooghly P. 67

=== Agriculture ===
In 2013-14, the small percentage of persons engaged in agriculture in Sreerampur Uttarpara CD Block could be classified as follows: bargadars 12.25%, patta (document) holders 3.32%, small farmers (possessing land between 1 and 2 hectares) 0.43%, marginal farmers (possessing land up to 1 hectare) 52.66% and agricultural labourers 31.33%.

Sreerampur Uttarpara CD Block had 18 fertiliser depots, 19 seed stores and 29 fair price shops in 2013-14.

In 2013-14, Sreerampur Uttarpara CD Block produced 773 tonnes of Aman paddy, the main winter crop from 305 hectares, 369 tonnes of Boro paddy (spring crop) from 117 hectares, 1,095 tonnes of jute from 52 hectares, 2,585 tonnes of potatoes from 117 hectares and 2,132 tonnes of sugar cane from 14 hectares. It also produced pulses and oilseeds.

In 2013-14, the total area irrigated in Sreerampur Uttarpara CD Block was 1,776 hectares, out of which 985 hectares were irrigated by canal water, 390 hectares by tank water, 180 hectares by deep tube wells and 221 hectares by shallow tube wells.

=== Banking ===
In 2013-14, Sreerampur Uttarpara CD Block had offices of 7 commercial banks.

== Transport ==
Sreerampur Uttarpara CD Block has 5 originating/ terminating bus routes.

The Howrah-Bardhaman main line passes through this CD Block and there are stations at Uttarpara, Hind Motor, Konnagar, Rishra, Shrirampur, Sheoraphuli and Baidyabati. The stations located in the cities/ municipal towns are outside the CD Block.

It is part of Kolkata Suburban Railway system.

== Education ==
In 2013-14, Sreerampur Uttarpara CD Block had 51 primary schools with 5,053 students, 6 high schools with 2,287 students and 10 higher secondary schools with 8,872 students. Sreerampur Uttarpara CD Block had 1 general college with 2,366 students and 182 institutions for special and non-formal education with 3,303 students

In Sreerampur Uttarpar CD Block, amongst the 13 inhabited villages, all villages had a school, 7 villages had more than 1 primary school, 4 villages had at least 1 primary and 1 middle school and 3 villages had at least 1 middle and 1 secondary school.

== Healthcare ==
In 2014, Sreerampur Uttarpara CD Block had 1 block primary health centre and 2 primary health centres with total 85 beds and 4 doctors (excluding private bodies). It had 25 family welfare subcentres. 14,030 patients were treated indoor and 172,915 patients were treated outdoor in the hospitals, health centres and subcentres of the CD Block.

Sreerampur Uttarpara CD Block has Kanaipur Rural Hospital (with 30 beds) at Kanaipur and Rajyadharpur Primary Health Centre (with 10 beds).

Sreerampur Uttarpara CD Block is one of the areas of Hooghly district where ground water is affected by moderate level of arsenic contamination. The WHO guideline for arsenic in drinking water is 10 mg/ litre, and the Indian Standard value is 50 mg/ litre. In Hooghly district, 16 blocks have arsenic levels above WHO guidelines and 11 blocks above Indian standard value. The maximum concentration in Sreerampur Uttarpara CD Block is 200 mg/litre.
