= Nabagram, Hooghly =

Nabagram
- Census Town
- Location in West Bengal, India Nabagram (India)
- Coordinates: 22.705139°N 88.335361°E
- Country: India
- State: West Bengal
- District: Hooghly
- Nearest City: Serampore
- Elevation: 15 m (49 ft)

Population (2011)
  - Total: 18,358

Languages
  - Official: Bengali, English
- Time zone: UTC+5:30 (IST)
- Vehicle registration: WB
- Website: wb.gov.in

Nabagram is a census town in Sreerampur Uttarpara CD Block in Srirampore subdivision of Hooghly district in the Indian state of West Bengal.

== Geography ==
Cities and towns in the Sreerampur Uttarpara CD Block in Srirampore subdivision in Hooghly district
M: municipal city/ town, CT: census town,
Owing to space constraints in the small map, the actual locations in a larger map may vary slightly

=== Location ===
Nabagram Colony is located at 22.29°N 88.51°E. It has an average elevation of 15 m (49 ft).

Rishra (CT), Bamunari, Nawapara, Nabagram Colony, Kanaipur, Basai and Raghunathpur (PS-Dankuni) form a cluster of census towns on the eastern side of the series of statutory towns/ cities – Rishra, Konnagar and Uttarpara.

The area consists of flat alluvial plains, that form a part of the Gangetic Delta. This belt is highly industrialised.

=== Urbanisation ===
Srirampore subdivision is the most urbanized of the subdivisions in Hooghly district. 73.13% of the population in the subdivision is urban and 26.88% is rural. The subdivision has 6 municipalities and 34 census towns. The municipalities are: Uttarpara Kotrung Municipality, Konnagar Municipality, Serampore Municipality, Baidyabati Municipality, Rishra Municipality and Dankuni Municipality. Amongst the CD Blocks in the subdivision, Uttarapara Serampore (census towns shown in the map alongside) had 76% urban population, Chanditala I 42%, Chanditala II 69% and Jangipara 7% (census towns in the last 3 CD Blocks are shown in a separate map). All places marked in the map are linked in the larger full screen map.

== Demographics ==
As per 2011 Census of India, Nabagram Colony had a total population of 18,358 of which 9,083 (49%) were males and 9,275 (51%) were females. Population below 6 years was 1,087. The total number of literates in Nabagram Colony was 16,576 (95.98% of the population over 6 years).

As of 2001 India census, Nabagram Colony had a population of 31,923. Males constitute 63% of the population and females 37%. Nabagram Colony has an average literacy rate of 85%, higher than the national average of 59.5%: male literacy is 88%, and female literacy is 81%. In Nabagram Colony, 9% of the population is under 6 years of age.

The electricity is provided by WBSEDCL and overall the electricity remains 24x7, without any interruption. There is a Panchayat which takes decisions to develop the area.

=== Kolkata Urban Agglomeration ===
The following Municipalities and Census Towns in Hooghly district were part of Kolkata Urban Agglomeration in 2011 census: Bansberia (M), Hugli-Chinsurah (M), Bara Khejuria (Out Growth), Shankhanagar (CT), Amodghata (CT), Chak Bansberia (CT), Naldanga (CT), Kodalia (CT), Kulihanda (CT), Simla (CT), Dharmapur (CT), Bhadreswar (M), Champdani (M), Chandannagar (M Corp.), Baidyabati (M), Serampore (M), Rishra (M), Rishra (CT), Bamunari (CT), Dakshin Rajyadharpur (CT), Nabagram Colony (CT), Konnagar (M), Uttarpara Kotrung (M), Raghunathpur (PS-Dankuni) (CT), Kanaipur (CT) and Keota (CT).

== Transport ==
Konnagar railway station on the Howrah-Bardhaman main line is the nearest railway station.
