= Bamunari =

- Census Town
- Location in West Bengal, India Bamunari (India)
- Coordinates: 22.71951°N 88.31252°E
- Country: India
- State: West Bengal
- District: Hooghly

Population (2011)
  - Total: 6,266

Languages
  - Official: Bengali, English
- Time zone: UTC+5:30 (IST)
- Vehicle registration: WB
- Website: wb.gov.in

Bamunari is a census town of Sreerampur Uttarpara CD Block in Srirampore subdivision of Hooghly district in the state of West Bengal, India.

== Demographics ==
As per 2011 Census of India Bamunari had a total population of 6,266 of which 3,227 (52%) were males and 3,039 (48%) were females. Population below 6 years was 580. The total number of literates in Bamunari was 4,997 (87.88% of the population over 6 years).

As of 2001 India census, Bamunari had a population of 6,913. Males constitute 52% of the population and females 48%. Bamunari has an average literacy rate of 72%, higher than the national average of 59.5%; with 55% of the males and 45% of females literate. 11% of the population is under 6 years of age.

=== Kolkata Urban Agglomeration ===
The following Municipalities and Census Towns in Hooghly district were part of Kolkata Urban Agglomeration in 2011 census: Bansberia (M), Hugli-Chinsurah (M), Bara Khejuria (Out Growth), Shankhanagar (CT), Amodghata (CT), Chak Bansberia (CT), Naldanga (CT), Kodalia (CT), Kulihanda (CT), Simla (CT), Dharmapur (CT), Bhadreswar (M), Champdani (M), Chandannagar (M Corp.), Baidyabati (M), Serampore (M), Rishra (M), Rishra (CT), Bamunari (CT), Dakshin Rajyadharpur (CT), Nabagram Colony (CT), Konnagar (M), Uttarpara Kotrung (M), Raghunathpur (PS-Dankuni) (CT), Kanaipur (CT) and Keota (CT).

== Geography ==
Cities and towns in the Sreerampur Uttarpara CD Block in Srirampore subdivision in Hooghly district
M: municipal city/ town, CT: census town,
Owing to space constraints in the small map, the actual locations in a larger map may vary slightly

=== Location ===
Bamunari is located at 22.71951°N 88.31252°E.

Rishra (CT), Bamunari, Nawapara, Nabagram Colony, Kanaipur, Basai and Raghunathpur (PS-Dankuni) form a cluster of census towns on the eastern side of the series of statutory towns/ cities – Rishra, Konnagar and Uttarpara.

The area consists of flat alluvial plains, that form a part of the Gangetic Delta. This belt is highly industrialised.

=== Urbanisation ===
Srirampore subdivision is the most urbanized of the subdivisions in Hooghly district. 73.13% of the population in the subdivision is urban and 26.88% is rural. The subdivision has 6 municipalities and 34 census towns. The municipalities are: Uttarpara Kotrung Municipality, Konnagar Municipality, Serampore Municipality, Baidyabati Municipality, Rishra Municipality and Dankuni Municipality. Amongst the CD Blocks in the subdivision, Uttarapara Serampore (census towns shown in the map alongside) had 76% urban population, Chanditala I 42%, Chanditala II 69% and Jangipara 7% (census towns in the last 3 CD Blocks are shown in a separate map). All places marked in the map are linked in the larger full screen map.

== Transport ==
SH 13 (Delhi Road) passes through Bamunari.

=== Bus ===
==== Private Bus ====
- 26A Serampore - Aushbati
- 40 Serampore - Birshibpur

==== Bus Route Without Number ====
- Baidyabati railway station - Shyambazar/ Kolkata Station

=== Train ===
Rishra railway station on the Howrah-Bardhaman main line is the nearest railway station.
