= Raghunathpur (PS-Dankuni) =

- Census Town
- Location in West Bengal, India Raghunathpur (West Bengal) Raghunathpur (India)
- Coordinates: 22.671129°N 88.312867°E
- Country: India
- State: West Bengal
- District: Hooghly

Population (2011)
  - Total: 9,650

Languages
  - Official: Bengali, English
- Time zone: UTC+5:30 (IST)
- Vehicle registration: WB
- Website: wb.gov.in

Raghunathpur is a census town in Sreerampur Uttarpara CD Block in Srirampore subdivision of Hooghly district in the Indian state of West Bengal.

== Geography ==
Cities and towns in the Sreerampur Uttarpara CD Block in Srirampore subdivision in Hooghly district
M: municipal city/ town, CT: census town,
Owing to space constraints in the small map, the actual locations in a larger map may vary slightly

=== Location ===
Raghunathpur is located at 22.671129°N 88.312867°E.

Rishra (CT), Bamunari, Nawapara, Nabagram Colony, Kanaipur, Basai and Raghunathpur form a cluster of census towns on the eastern side of the series of statutory towns/ cities – Rishra, Konnagar and Uttarpara.

=== Urbanisation ===
Srirampore subdivision is the most urbanized of the subdivisions in Hooghly district. 73.13% of the population in the subdivision is urban and 26.88% is rural. The subdivision has 6 municipalities and 34 census towns. The municipalities are: Uttarpara Kotrung Municipality, Konnagar Municipality, Serampore Municipality, Baidyabati Municipality, Rishra Municipality and Dankuni Municipality. Amongst the CD Blocks in the subdivision, Uttarapara Serampore (census towns shown in the map alongside) had 76% urban population, Chanditala I 42%, Chanditala II 69% and Jangipara 7% (census towns in the last 3 CD Blocks are shown in a separate map). All places marked in the map are linked in the larger full screen map.

== Demographics ==
As per 2011 Census of India, Raghunathpur had a total population of 9,650 of which 4,903 (51%) were males and 4,747 (49%) were females. Population below 6 years was 895. The total number of literates in Raghunathpur was 7,356 (84.02% of the population over 6 years).

As of 2001 India census, Raghunathpur (PS-Dankuni) had a population of 7,996. Males constitute 51% of the population and females 49%. Raghunathpur (PS-Dankuni) has an average literacy rate of 73%, higher than the national average of 59.5%: male literacy is 80%, and female literacy is 66%. In Raghunathpur (PS-Dankuni), 10% of the population is under 6 years of age.

=== Kolkata Urban Agglomeration ===
The following Municipalities and Census Towns in Hooghly district were part of Kolkata Urban Agglomeration in 2011 census: Bansberia (M), Hugli-Chinsurah (M), Bara Khejuria (Out Growth), Shankhanagar (CT), Amodghata (CT), Chak Bansberia (CT), Naldanga (CT), Kodalia (CT), Kulihanda (CT), Simla (CT), Dharmapur (CT), Bhadreswar (M), Champdani (M), Chandannagar (M Corp.), Baidyabati (M), Serampore (M), Rishra (M), Rishra (CT), Bamunari (CT), Dakshin Rajyadharpur (CT), Nabagram Colony (CT), Konnagar (M), Uttarpara Kotrung (M), Raghunathpur (PS-Dankuni) (CT), Kanaipur (CT) and Keota (CT).

== Transport ==
Raghunathpur is close to the junction of Durgapur Expressway and Delhi Road.

=== Bus ===
==== Private Bus ====
- 26 Champadanga - Bonhooghly
- 26A Serampore - Aushbati
- 26C Jagatballavpur - Bonhooghly
- 40 Serampore - Birshibpur
- 51 Pardankuni - Howrah Station
- DN46 Dankuni Housing - Salt Lake Karunamoyee

==== CTC Bus ====
- C23 Dankuni Housing - Park Circus

Many Shuttle Buses (Without Numbers) also pass through here.

=== Train ===
Dankuni railway station on the Howrah-Bardhaman chord line is the nearest railway station.
