= Dakshin Rajyadharpur =

- Census Town
- Location in West Bengal, India Dakshin Rajyadharpur (India)
- Coordinates: 22.76°N 88.32°E
- Country: India
- State: West Bengal
- District: Hooghly

Population (2011)
  - Total: 11,254

Languages
  - Official: Bengali, English
- Time zone: UTC+5:30 (IST)
- Vehicle registration: WB
- Website: wb.gov.in

Dakshin Rajyadharpur is a census town in Sreerampur Uttarpara CD Block in Srirampore subdivision of Hooghly district in the state of West Bengal, India.

== Geography ==
Cities and towns in the Sreerampur Uttarpara CD Block in Srirampore subdivision in Hooghly district
M: municipal city/ town, CT: census town,
Owing to space constraints in the small map, the actual locations in a larger map may vary slightly

=== Location ===
Dakshin Rajyadharpur is located at 22.76°N 88.32°E.

Belumilki and Dakshin Rajyadharpur are close to Serampore.

The area consists of flat alluvial plains that form a part of the Gangetic Delta. This belt is highly industrialised.

=== Urbanisation ===
Srirampore subdivision is the most urbanized of the subdivisions in Hooghly district. 73.13% of the population in the subdivision is urban and 26.88% is rural. The subdivision has 6 municipalities and 34 census towns. The municipalities are: Uttarpara Kotrung Municipality, Konnagar Municipality, Serampore Municipality, Baidyabati Municipality, Rishra Municipality and Dankuni Municipality. Amongst the CD Blocks in the subdivision, Uttarapara Serampore (census towns shown in the map alongside) had 76% urban population, Chanditala I 42%, Chanditala II 69% and Jangipara 7% (census towns in the last 3 CD Blocks are shown in a separate map). All places marked in the map are linked in the larger full screen map.

== Demographics ==
As per 2011 Census of India, Dakshin Rajyadharpur had a population of 11,254, of which 5,739 (51%) were males and 5,515 (49%) were females. Population below 6 years was 984. The total number of literates in Dakshin Rajyadharpur was 9,110 (88.71% of the population over 6 years).

The following Municipalities and Census Towns in Hooghly district were part of Kolkata Urban Agglomeration in 2011 census: Bansberia (M), Hugli-Chinsurah (M), Bara Khejuria (Out Growth), Shankhanagar (CT), Amodghata (CT), Chak Bansberia (CT), Naldanga (CT), Kodalia (CT), Kulihanda (CT), Simla (CT), Dharmapur (CT), Bhadreswar (M), Champdani (M), Chandannagar (M Corp.), Baidyabati (M), Serampore (M), Rishra (M), Rishra (CT), Bamunari (CT), Dakshin Rajyadharpur (CT), Nabagram Colony (CT), Konnagar (M), Uttarpara Kotrung (M), Raghunathpur (PS-Dankuni) (CT), Kanaipur (CT) and Keota (CT).

As of 2001 India census, Dakshin Rajyadharpur had a population of 9303. Males constitute 52% of the population and females 48%. Dakshin Rajyadharpur has an average literacy rate of 77%, higher than the national average of 59.5%: male literacy is 81% and, female literacy is 72%. In Dakshin Rajyadharpur, 10% of the population is under 6 years of age.

== Economy ==
- Hooghly Alloy & Steels Co. Pvt. Ltd. was established in 1985 and has a 60,000 tonnes per annum rolling mills at Dakshin Rajyadharpur.
- Nipha Exports Pvt. Ltd. situated at Old Delhi Road.
- Flipkart India Pvt. Ltd. established his warehouse branch (Aarna Projects) in 2014 at Old Delhi Road.
- Bhandari Automobiles (dealer of Maruti Suzuki) established in 2014 and situated at Old Delhi Road.
- Mukesh Hyundai ex-showroom situated at Old Delhi Road.
- Priya Mari Biscuit manufacturing unit situated at Old Delhi Road.
- Reliance e-commerce warehouse situated at Old Delhi Road.
- PU Foames Pvt. Ltd. also situated at Old Delhi Road.
- Malpani Chemicals Pvt. Ltd.

== Healthcare ==
Rajyadharpur has a Primary Health Centre with ten beds.

== Transport ==
State Highway 6/ Grand Trunk Road (G.T. Road) passes through Dakshin Rajyadharpur. It is also extended to State Highway 13 in the west.

=== Private bus ===
- 2 Bagkhal - Chunchura Court
- 26A Serampore - Aushbati
- 31 Serampore - Jangipara
- 40 Serampore - Birshibpur

=== Train ===
Serampore railway station on the Howrah-Bardhaman main line is the nearest railway station. It is part of the Kolkata Suburban Railway system.
