= Basilica of the Holy Rosary, Bandel =

Coordinates: 22.9190°N 88.3952°E

Bandel Church
- The Basilica of the Holy-Rosary, Bandel
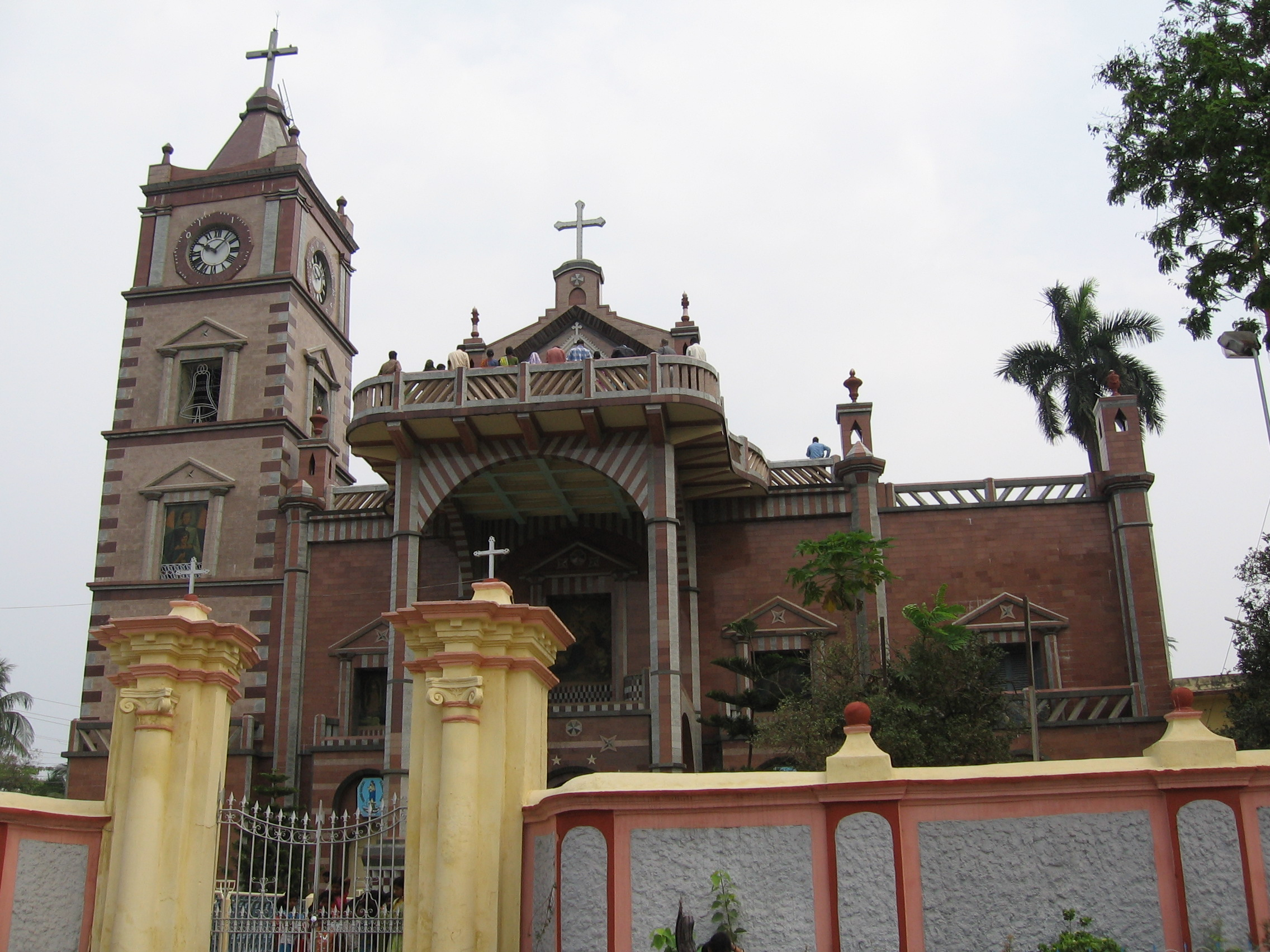
- The façade of the Bandel Church
- Bandel Church
- Location: Bandel, West Bengal
- Country: India
- Denomination: Roman Catholic

History
- Status: Minor basilica
- Founded: 1599

Administration
- Archdiocese: Calcutta
- Deanery: Hoogly

Clergy
- Archbishop: Thomas D'Souza

The Basilica of the Holy Rosary (commonly known as Bandel Church) is one of the oldest Christian churches in West Bengal, India. Situated in Bandel, Hooghly district of West Bengal, it stands as a memorial to the Portuguese settlement in Bengal. Founded in 1599, it is dedicated to Nossa Senhora do Rosário, Our Lady of the Rosary. It is also a parish church, part of the Roman Catholic Archdiocese of Calcutta. It is one of the most prominent historical churches in West Bengal as well as in India.

== History ==
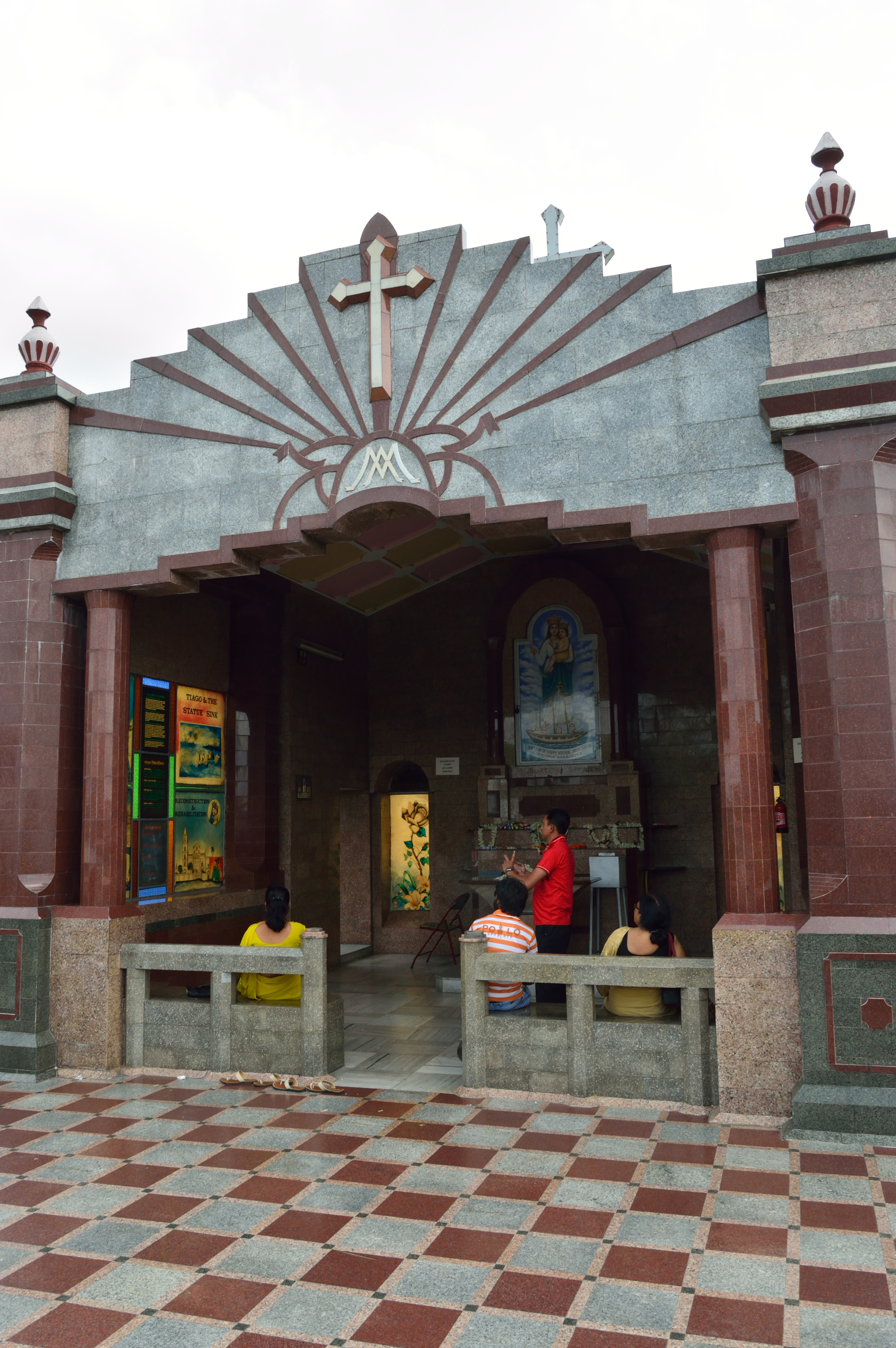
Our Lady of Happy Voyage Shrine, rooftop Bandel Basilica.

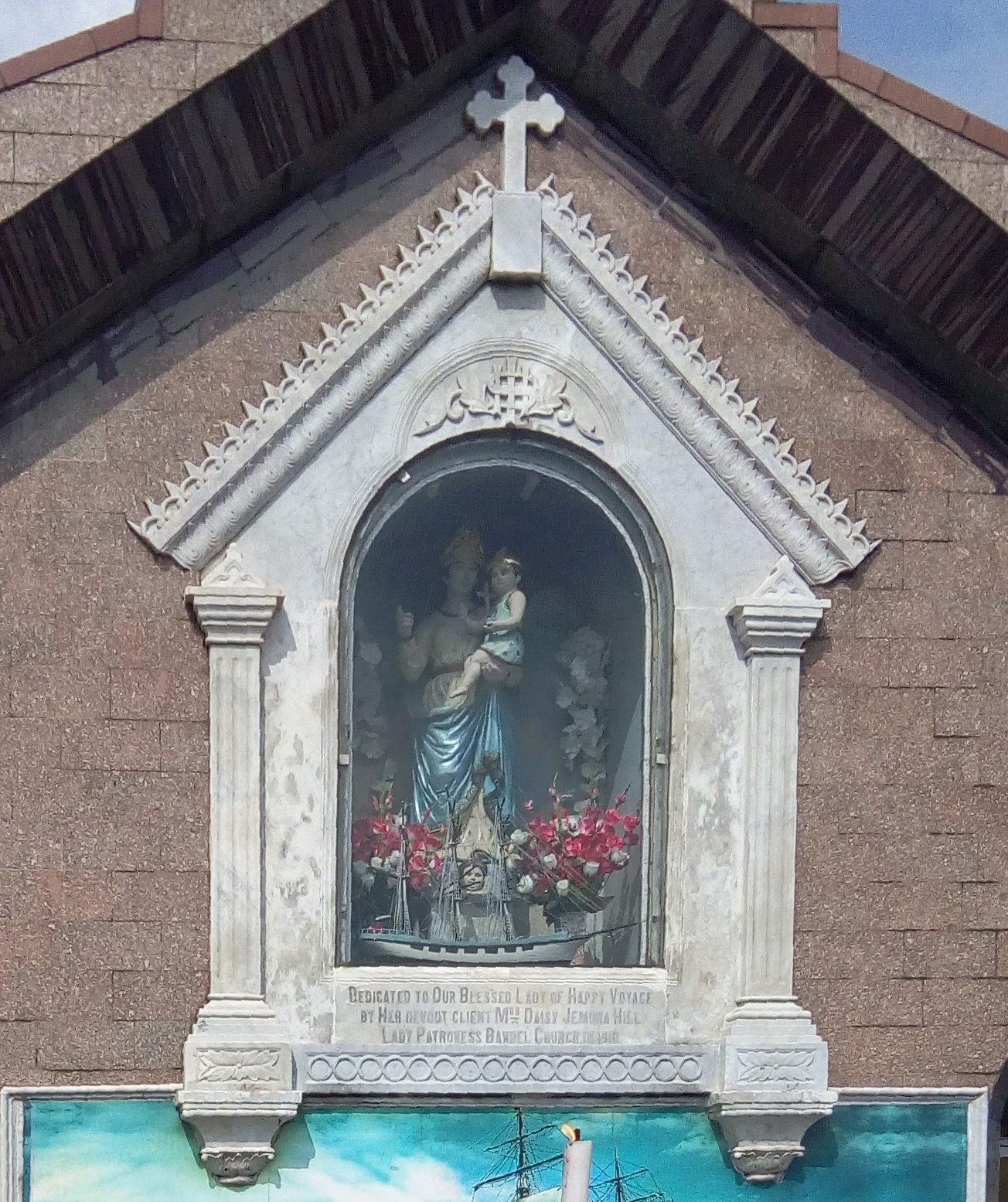
Statue of Mother Mary (Nossa Senhora do Rosário, Our Lady of the Rosary) with Jesus at the church.

…the Portuguese church, which is now the great sight of modern Bandel. This, the oldest Christian place of worship in Bengal, India, was founded in 1599, the year in which Queen Elizabeth sanctioned the establishment of the East India Company. It was burnt in the sack of Hooghly by the Moors in 1632, but the keystone with the date 1599 was preserved and built into the gate of the new church erected by John Comes de Soto in 1661. It is dedicated to Nossa Senhora di Rosario and contains a monastery once occupied by Augustinian friars, the last of whom died in 1869… Some 380 bigghahs of land, out of the 777 granted rent-free by Shah Jehan, are still enjoyed… Every November the church is thronged with pilgrims during the Novena of Notre Dame de Bon Voyage.

— Cotton, H.E.A (1909)

Around the middle of the 16th century, the Portuguese began using Bandel as a port. During or around 1571, they were given permission by Akbar, the Mughal emperor, to build a town in Hooghly. As they began settling around the area, their priests began to baptise the natives — by 1598, Catholics in Hooghly numbered around five thousand, including natives and mixed races.

In 1579, the Portuguese built a port on the banks of the Hooghly, as well as a fort named Fort Ugolim, and enlisted the services of a band of Augustinian friars, then the largest religious body in Goa. The following year, Captain Pedro Tavares obtained the emperor's full permission to preach the Catholic faith publicly, and erect churches. Thus the Bandel Church came to be constructed in 1599.

This first church was burnt down during the sacking of Hooghly by the Mughals in 1632. A newer church, constructed by Gomez de Soto (also spelt John Comes de Soto), was built over the ruin in 1660. The keystone of the older church can still be seen on the eastern gate of the monastery, bearing the date 1599.

On November 25, 1988, Pope John Paul II declared the sanctuary a minor basilica.

== Layout ==
A ship's mast stands in front of the church; it was presented to the church by the captain of a vessel that had encountered a storm in the Bay of Bengal, whose rescue was attributed to Mary's intercession. The church has three altars, several tombstones, a pipe organ, and a shrine to Mary.
