= Belumilki =

- Census Town
- Location in West Bengal, India Belumilki (India)
- Coordinates: 22.751°N 88.293°E
- Country: India
- State: West Bengal
- District: Hooghly

Population (2011)
  - Total: 10,998

Languages
  - Official: Bengali, English
- Time zone: UTC+5:30 (IST)
- Telephone code: +91 33
- Vehicle registration: WB
- Lok Sabha constituency: Srerampur
- Vidhan Sabha constituency: Sreerampur
- Website: hooghly.gov.in

Belumilki is a census town in Sreerampur Uttarpara CD Block in Srirampore subdivision of Hooghly district in the Indian state of West Bengal.

== Geography ==
Cities and towns in the Sreerampur Uttarpara CD Block in Srirampore subdivision in Hooghly district
M: municipal city/ town, CT: census town,
Owing to space constraints in the small map, the actual locations in a larger map may vary slightly

=== Location ===
Belumilki is located at 22.751°N 88.293°E

Belumilki and Dakshin Rajyadharpur are close to Serampore.

=== Urbanisation ===
Srirampore subdivision is the most urbanized of the subdivisions in Hooghly district. 73.13% of the population in the subdivision is urban and 26.88% is rural. The subdivision has 6 municipalities and 34 census towns. The municipalities are: Uttarpara Kotrung Municipality, Konnagar Municipality, Serampore Municipality, Baidyabati Municipality, Rishra Municipality and Dankuni Municipality. Amongst the CD Blocks in the subdivision, Uttarapara Serampore (census towns shown in the map alongside) had 76% urban population, Chanditala I 42%, Chanditala II 69% and Jangipara 7% (census towns in the last 3 CD Blocks are shown in a separate map). All places marked in the map are linked in the larger full screen map.

== Demographics ==
As per 2011 Census of India Belumilki had a total population of 10,998 of which 5,491 (50%) were males and 5,507 (50%) were females. Population below 6 years was 1,141. The total number of literates in Belumilki was 7,660 (77.71% of the population over 6 years).

== Transport ==
Belumilki is on Road Number 31 linking Serampore to Sehakhala. Hooghly Private Bus Route Number 31 (Serampore - Jangipara) serves the locality. Baruipara railway station and Serampore railway station are the nearest railway stations.
