= Simla, West Bengal =

Simla
- Census Town
- Location in West Bengal, India Simla (India)
- Coordinates: 22.8887°N 88.3641°E
- Country: India
- State: West Bengal
- District: Hooghly

Population (2011)
  - Total: 15,998

Languages
  - Official: Bengali, English
- Time zone: UTC+5:30 (IST)
- ISO 3166 code: IN-WB
- Vehicle registration: WB
- Website: wb.gov.in

Simla is a census town in Chinsurah Mogra CD Block in Chinsurah subdivision of Hooghly district in the Indian state of West Bengal.

== Geography ==
Cities and towns in the Chinsurah subdivision (except Polba Dadpur and Dhaniakhali CD Blocks) in Hooghly district
M: municipal city/ town, CT: census town, R: rural/ urban centre,
Owing to space constraints in the small map, the actual locations in a larger map may vary slightly

=== Location ===
Simla is located at 22.74°N 88.32°E.

The area is composed of flat alluvial plains that form a part of the Gangetic Delta. The high west bank of the tidal Hooghly River is highly industrialised.

Keota, Manushpur, Naldanga, Kodalia, Kulihanda, Dharmapur and Simla form a cluster of census towns on the eastern side of Hugli-Chuchura.

=== Urbanisation ===
There are 13 statutory towns and 64 census towns in Hooghly district. The right bank of the Hooghly River has been industrialised over a long period. With the leading European powers dominating the area's industry, trade and commerce for over two centuries, it is amongst the leading industrialised areas in the state. At the same time the land is fertile and agricultural production is significant.

In Chinsurah subdivision 68.63% of the population is rural and the urban population is 31.37%. It has 2 statutory and 23 census towns. In Chinsurah Mogra CD Block 64.87% of the population is urban and 35.13% is rural. Amongst the four remaining CD Blocks in the subdivision two were overwhelmingly rural and two were wholly rural.

The map alongside shows a portion of Chinsurah subdivision. All places marked in the map are linked in the larger full screen map.

== Demographics ==
As per 2011 Census of India Simla had a total population of 15,998 of which 7,941 (50%) were males and 8,047 (50%) were females. Population below 6 years was 1,299. The total number of literates in Simla was 12,552 (85.39% of the population over 6 years).

As of the 2001 Indian census, Simla had a population of 13,632. Males constituted 51% of the population and females 49%. Simla had an average literacy rate of 72%, higher than the national average of 59.5%: male literacy was 77%, and female literacy was 67%. In Simla, 10% of the population was under 6 years of age.

=== Kolkata Urban Agglomeration ===
The following Municipalities and Census Towns in Hooghly district were part of Kolkata Urban Agglomeration in 2011 census: Bansberia (M), Hugli-Chinsurah (M), Bara Khejuria (Out Growth), Shankhanagar (CT), Amodghata (CT), Chak Bansberia (CT), Naldanga (CT), Kodalia (CT), Kulihanda (CT), Simla (CT), Dharmapur (CT), Bhadreswar (M), Champdani (M), Chandannagar (M Corp.), Baidyabati (M), Serampore (M), Rishra (M), Rishra (CT), Bamunari (CT), Dakshin Rajyadharpur (CT), Nabagram Colony (CT), Konnagar (M), Uttarpara Kotrung (M), Raghunathpur (PS-Dankuni) (CT), Kanaipur (CT) and Keota (CT).

== Transport ==
Chuchura railway station is the nearest railway station.
