= Statutory city =

Statutory city may refer to:

- Statutory city (Austria), an Austrian municipality acting as a district administrative authority
- Statutory city (Czech Republic), a Czech city with special privileges
- Statutory city (United States), a city in the U.S. that is not a home rule charter city (redirects to general-law municipality)
- Statutory city (Poland), a Polish city acting as a county

== See also ==
- City with county rights (Hungary)
- Consolidated city-county, a local government entity in the United States of a combined city and county
- Devolution, statutory delegation of power from a more centralized entity, such as the national government, to a state or local government
- Federal city, similar to an independent city, a city administered by a federal government rather than an intermediary (such as a province or state)
- Home rule usually indicates the opposite of a statutory city, especially in the U.S.
- Independent city, a city independent from another general-purpose local government entity (such as a province)
- Independent city (United States), a city independent from a county
- Kreisfreie Stadt (or Stadtkreis), a German city acting as a district administrative authority
- Unitary authority, a similar concept in the United Kingdom
