= Jupiter Wagons =

Rolling stock manufacturer

Jupiter Wagons Limited
- Type: Public
- Traded as: BSE: 533272; NSE: JWL
- Industry: Railways; Automobile; Heavy equipment Defense
- Founded: 28 July 1979; 47 years ago
- Headquarters: Kolkata, West Bengal, India
- Area served: Worldwide
- Key people: Vivek Lohia (Managing Director); Vikash Lohia (Whole time Director); Abhishek Jaiswal (CEO)
- Products: Freight wagons; Locomotives; Rolling stock; Shipping container; Electric vehicle; Defence service vehicle
- Production output: 6,500 wagons (2022)
- Revenue: ▲₹2,073.33 crore (US$220 million) (2023)
- Net income: ▲₹120.78 crore (US$13 million) (2023)
- Total assets: ▲₹1,072.40 crore (US$110 million) (2022)
- Total equity: ▲₹682.69 crore (US$73 million) (2022)
- Website: jupiterwagons.com

Jupiter Wagons Limited is an Indian private manufacturer of railway freight wagons, passenger coaches, wagon components, cast manganese steel crossings and castings headquartered in Kolkata, West Bengal. The company manufactures coaches for the Indian Railways and many other private companies.

== Acquisitions and mergers ==
=== Commercial Engineers & Body Builders Company Ltd (CEBBCO) ===
Commercial Engineers & Body Builders Company Ltd (CEBBCO), a Madhya Pradesh based manufacturer of tipplers, trailers, and specialized defence vehicles, was acquired by Jupiter Wagons Limited in a buyout of its organization in 2019 under a National Company Law Tribunal (NCLT) governed stressed asset sale.

JWL latter on 29 June 2022, announced its reverse merger with CEBBCO. Therefore, with this, the company completed its listing on the bourses.

=== Stone India ===
Jupiter Wagons Ltd was selected as the successful resolution applicant by the Committee of Creditors of Stone India Ltd, which used to supply electrical engineering products to Indian Railways such as Pantograph. Both JWL and Stone India being engaged in the same line of activity, the acquisition of Stone India by JWL was thereby slated to provide natural synergy to the company.

== Financials ==
The company has reported total income of Rs.2073.3345 crores during the Financial Year ended March 31, 2023 as compared to Rs.1181.7454 crores during the Financial Year ended March 31, 2022.

The company has posted net profit of Rs.120.78 crores for the Financial Year ended March 31, 2023 as against net profit of Rs.49.6759 crores for the Financial Year ended March 31, 2022.

== Subsidiaries & Joint ventures ==
- Jupiter Electric Mobility: Jupiter Electric Mobility (JEM) is a fully owned subsidiary of Jupiter Wagons Limited. It launched two Electric Light Commercial Vehicles (eLCV) at Auto Expo 2023 in Greater Noida. JEM TEZ is a smaller truck with up to 1 ton payload, and EV Star CC will be capable of carrying heavier payload. EV Star CC vehicle will be brought to Indian market in technical collaboration with EA GreenPower Motors, Canada. JEM TEZ is an indigenously developed vehicle and will be manufactured in its Indore plant. JEM Tez is expected to enter Indian market in 2024.JEM announced a landmark acquisition of Log9’s technology and business assets for its Railway Battery and Electric Truck Battery Divisions.
- JWL CAF Joint Venture: JWL entered into a MoU with Spain based firm CAF for setting up a manufacturing facility at an estimated investment of around ₹300crore. The investment as per plan would to be jointly funded by JWL and CAF.
- JWL DAKO-CZ India Limited: In 2022 JWL DAKO-CZ India Ltd was established to focus on development and supply of complete and modern braking system for the Indian Railways.
- JWL Talegria India Pvt. Ltd.: JWL has formed a JV with Talleres Alegria of Spain and has started the trials for Flash-butt welded CMS Crossings for Indian railways and global market.
- JWL Kovis India Pvt. Ltd.: JWL has formed a JV with Kovis d.o.o. of Slovenia and has started the manufacturing of Brake disc for high-speed passenger coaches in its Richai, Jabalpur plant.

== Products and services ==
- Railway freight: Rolling stock, components (bogies, couplers, locomotive shells, gears);
- Railway transit: Rolling stock (electric locomotives, EMU trainsets, DEMU trainsets, metros, body shells, bogies, propulsion & electrical equipment);
- Automobile: Commercial electric vehicles, commercial vehicle load bodies;
- Containers: Marine container, refrigerated container, truck mounted container & cold chain transport container

== See also ==
- Rail transport in India
