= Out growth =

Type of settlement

An out growth (OG) is an urban settlement contiguous to another urban area (such as a statutory town, census town, or city) that possesses urban characteristics but is not qualified as an independent town. It should not possess any uninhabited areas, and should be strictly contiguous with the town.

The 2011 Census of India defined it as:

A viable unit such as a village or part of a village contiguous to a statutory town and possess the urban features in terms of infrastructure and amenities such as pucca roads, electricity, taps, drainage system, educational institutions, post offices, medical facilities, banks etc.

Examples of OGs are Railway colonies, university colonies and port areas, that may come up near a city or statutory towns outside its statutory limits but within the revenue limit of a village or villages contiguous to the town or city.

== See also ==
- Urban agglomeration
- Urban sprawl
