= Chinsurah Mogra =

- Community development block

- Location in West Bengal, India
- Coordinates: 22.97925°N 88.374769°E
- Country: India
- State: West Bengal
- District: Hooghly

Government
  - Type: Representative democracy

Area
  - Total: 81.86 km^{2} (31.61 sq mi)
- Elevation: 16 m (52 ft)

Population (2011)
  - Total: 247,055
  - Density: 3,018/km^{2} (7,817/sq mi)

Languages
  - Official: Bengali, English
- Time zone: UTC+5:30 (IST)
- PIN: 712148 (Magra); 712123 (Bandel Junction)
- Area code: 03213
- Vehicle registration: WB-15, WB-16, WB-18
- Literacy: 83.01%
- Lok Sabha constituency: Hooghly
- Vidhan Sabha constituency: Chunchura, Balagarh, Saptagram
- Website: hooghly.gov.in

Chinsurah Mogra is a community development block that forms an administrative division in Chinsurah subdivision of Hooghly district in the Indian state of West Bengal.

== Overview ==
The Chinsurah Mogra CD Block is part of the Hooghly Flats, one of the three natural regions in the district of the flat alluvial plains that forms part of the Gangetic Delta. The region is a narrow strip of land along the 80 km long stretch of the Hooghly River, that forms the eastern boundary of the district. The region has been physiographically influenced by the course of the river. The Hooghly is a tidal river and has a high west bank. The Portuguese, the Dutch, the French, the Danes and the British dominated industry, trade and commerce in this area for more than two centuries, and as a result this belt is highly industrialised.

== Geography ==
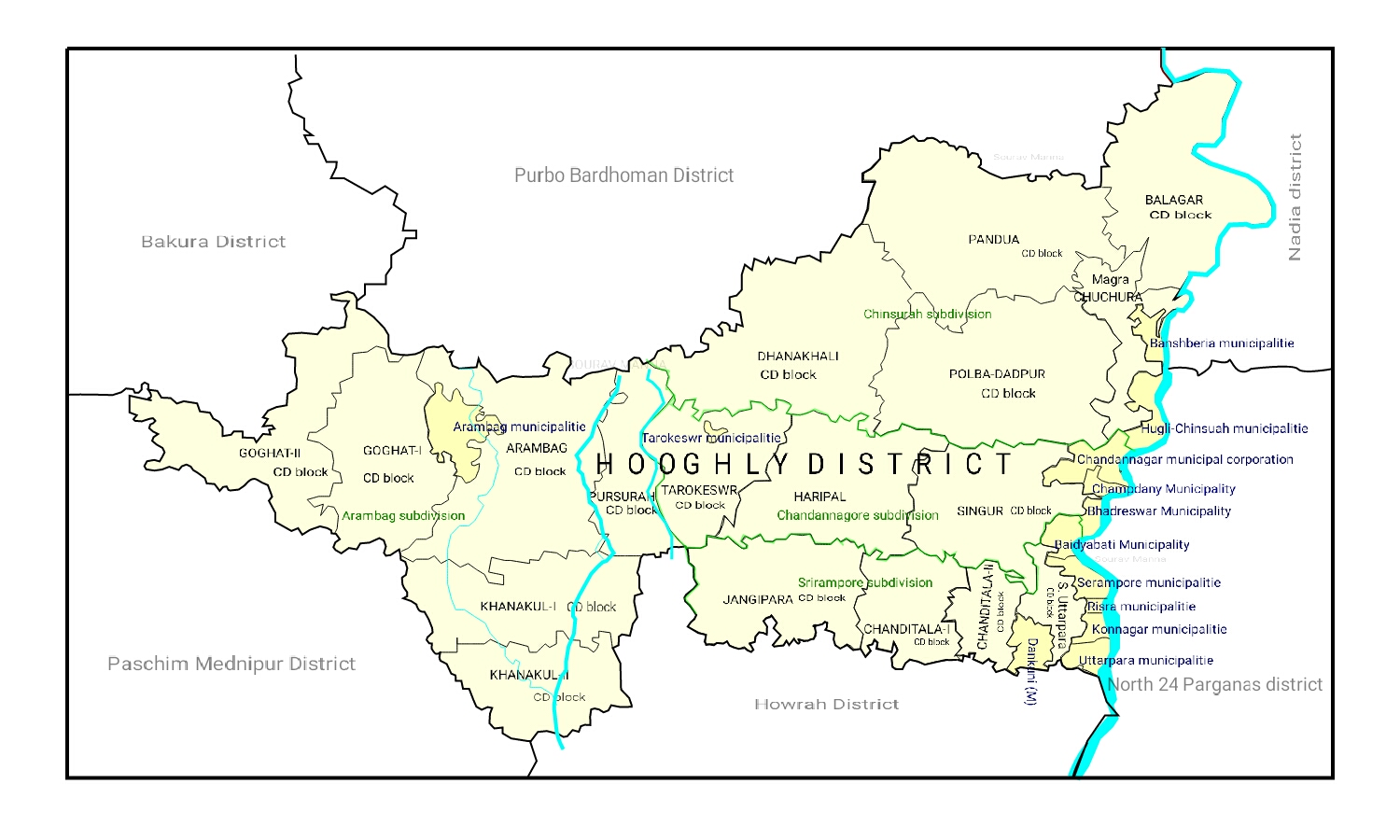
Map of Hooghly district showing CD blocks and municipal areas

Mogra is located at 22°58′45″N 88°22′29″E.

Chinsurah Mogra CD Block is bounded by Pandua and Balagarh CD Blocks, in the north, Chakdaha CD Block, in Nadia district across the Hooghly the east, Sreerampur Uttarpara CD Block in the south and Polba Dadpur CD Block in the west.

It is located around Chinsurah, the district headquarters.

Chinsurah Mogra CD Block has an area of 81.86 km^{2}. It has 1 panchayat samity, 10 gram panchayats, 196 gram sansads (village councils), 56 mouzas and 52 inhabited villages. Chinsurah and Mogra police stations serve this block. The headquarters of this CD block is at Mogra.

Map of Chinsurah Mogra CD block

Gram panchayats of Chinsurah Mogra block/ panchayat samiti are: Bandel, Chandrahati I, Chandrahati II, Debanandapur, Digsui-Hoera, Kodalia I, Kodalia II, Mogra I, Mogra II and Saptagram.

== Demographics ==
=== Population ===
As per the 2011 Census of India, Chinsurah Magra CD Block had a total population of 247,055, of which 86,792 were rural and 160,263 were urban. There were 126,061 (51%) males and 120,994 (49%) females. Population below 6 years was 23,643. Scheduled Castes numbered 72,909 (29.51%) and Scheduled Tribes numbered 8,982 (3.64%).

As per the 2001 census, Chinsurah-Mogra block had a total population of 211,036, out of which 109,751 were males and 1101,285 were females. Chinsurah-Mogra block registered a population growth of 26.54 per cent during the 1991-2001 decade. Decadal growth for Hooghly district was 15.72 per cent. Decadal growth in West Bengal was 17.84 per cent.

Census Towns in Chinsurah Mogra CD Block (2011 census figures in brackets): Kola (7,271), Hansghara (7,665), Raghunathpur (14,919), Madhusudanpur (6,685), Amodghata (7,910), Alikhoja (4,613), Shankhanagar (8,601), Chak Bansberia (10,357), Manushpur (8,148), Keota (18,875), Kodalia (8,994), Naldanga (13,140), Kulihanda (15,969), Dharmapur (8,556) and Simla (15,988).

Out growth in Chinsurah Mogra CD Block (2011 census figure in brackets): Bara Khejuria (Ward No. 31) (2,672).

Large villages (with 4,000+ population) in Chinsurah Mogra CD Block are (2011 census figures in brackets): Digsui (4,183), Gajaghanta (4,680), Dingalhat (4,574) and Kanagar (4,131).

Other villages in Chinsurah Mogra CD Block include (2011 census figures in brackets): Talandu (1,366), Saptagram (1,758), Debanandapur (3,499) and Hoera (2,390).

=== Literacy ===
As per the 2011 census the total number of literates in Chinsurah Mogra CD Block was 185,446 (83.01% of the population over 6 years) out of which males numbered 100,676 (88.22% of the male population over 6 years) and females numbered 84,770 (77.57% of the female population over 6 years). The gender disparity (the difference between female and male literacy rates) was 10.65%.

As per the 2001 census, Chinsurah-Mogra block had a total literacy of 56.72 per cent. While male literacy was 75.24 per cent, female literacy was 57.09 per cent.

See also – List of West Bengal districts ranked by literacy rate

Literacy in CD blocks of
Hooghly district
Arambagh subdivision
Arambagh – 79.10
Khanakul I – 77.73
Khanakul II – 79.16
Goghat I – 78.70
Goghat II – 77.24
Pursurah – 82.12
Chandannagar subdivision
Haripal – 78.59
Singur – 84.01
Tarakeswar – 79.96
Chinsurah subdivision
Balagarh – 76.94
Chinsurah Mogra – 83.01
Dhaniakhali – 75.66
Pandua – 75.86
Polba Dadpur – 75.14
Srirampore subdivision
Chanditala I – 83.76
Chanditala II – 84.78
Jangipara – 75.34
Sreerampur Uttarpara – 87.33
Source: 2011 Census: CD Block Wise
Primary Census Abstract Data

=== Language and religion ===
Religion in Chinsurah-Mogra CD block (2011)
Hinduism	87.80%
Islam	10.39%
Other (tribal religion)	0.79%
Other or not stated	1.02%

As per the 2011 census, majority of the population of the district belong to the Hindu community with a population share of 82.9% followed by Muslims at 15.8%. The percentage of the Hindu population of the district has followed a decreasing trend from 87.1% in 1961 to 82.9% in the latest census 2011. On the other hand, the percentage of Muslim population has increased from 12.7% in 1961 to 15.8% in 2011 census.

In the 2011 census Hindus numbered 214,571 and formed 87.80% of the population in Chinsurah Mogra CD Block. Muslims numbered 25,400 and formed 10.39% of the population. Others numbered 4,412 and formed 1.81% of the population.

Languages of Chinsurah-Mogra CD block (2011)
1. Bengali (72.7%)
2. Hindi (19.6%)
3. Urdu (3.64%)
4. Santali (2.36%)
5. Others (1.79%)

At the time of the 2011 census, 72.65% of the population spoke Bengali, 19.56% Hindi, 3.64% Urdu and 2.36% Santali as their first language.

== Administration ==
=== Zilla Parishad ===
Chinsurah–Mogra CD Block has 3 Zilla Parishad seats. The latest elections were held in July 2023 where the Trinamool Congress won all 3 seats.

Zilla Parishad	ZP No.	Councillor	Party	Remarks
Chinsurah–Mogra	13	Nirmalya Chakraborty	Trinamool Congress	
Chinsurah–Mogra	14	Mausumi Ghosh	Trinamool Congress	
Chinsurah–Mogra	15	Papiya Dhak	Trinamool Congress	

=== Panchayat Samiti ===
Chinsurah–Mogra Panchayat Samiti has 30 divisions. The latest elections were held in July 2023 where the Trinamool Congress by scored a landslide victory by winning all 30 divisions.

Chairperson: Shukla Chatterjee
Deputy Chairperson: Bikash Chandra Roy
Gram Panchayat	No.	Councillor	Party	Remarks
Debanandapur	1	Tanushree Chattopadhyay	Trinamool Congress	
Debanandapur	2	Purnima Das	Trinamool Congress	
Debanandapur	3	Sarwari Khatoon	Trinamool Congress	
Bandel	4	Shabana Begum	Trinamool Congress	
Bandel	5	Rumpa Sen	Trinamool Congress	
Bandel	6	Sheikh Jahiruddin	Trinamool Congress	
Kodalia-II	7	Aparna Biswas	Trinamool Congress	
Kodalia-II	8	Tilottoma Majumdar	Trinamool Congress	
Kodalia-II	9	Tapas Chakraborty	Trinamool Congress	
Kodalia-I	10	Asha Sarkar	Trinamool Congress	
Kodalia-I	11	Shukla Chatterjee	Trinamool Congress	
Kodalia-I	12	Sanjib Kar	Trinamool Congress	
Chandrahati-I	13	Putul Ghosh	Trinamool Congress	
Chandrahati-I	14	Alok Chandra Das	Trinamool Congress	
Chandrahati-I	15	Jyotsna Pal	Trinamool Congress	
Chandrahati-II	16	Tapas Parui	Trinamool Congress	
Chandrahati-II	17	Rupali Das	Trinamool Congress	
Chandrahati-II	18	Mamataj Begum	Trinamool Congress	
Digsui-Hoerah	19	Nimai Majhi	Trinamool Congress	
Digsui-Hoerah	20	Rita Kisku	Trinamool Congress	
Digsui-Hoerah	21	Rabindranath Ghosh	Trinamool Congress	
Mogra-I	22	Mukul Rajak Das	Trinamool Congress	
Mogra-I	23	Purnima Sardar	Trinamool Congress	
Mogra-I	24	Bela Bhattacharya	Trinamool Congress	
Mogra-II	25	Bikash Chandra Roy	Trinamool Congress	
Mogra-II	26	Prabir Biswas	Trinamool Congress	
Mogra-II	27	Sujoy Biswas	Trinamool Congress	
Saptagram	28	Manasi Poddar	Trinamool Congress	
Saptagram	29	Gulshan Bibi	Trinamool Congress	
Saptagram	30	Mahtab Alam	Trinamool Congress	

=== Gram Panchayats ===
Chinsurah–Mogra Panchayat Samiti has 10 villages or gram panchayats. The latest elections were held in July 2023 where the Trinamool Congress won all the 10 villages.

No.	Gram Panchayat	Total Seats							Majority
No.	Gram Panchayat	Total Seats	AITC	BJP	SDA			Others	Majority
No.	Gram Panchayat	Total Seats	AITC	BJP	CPI(M)	INC	AIFB	Others	Majority
1	Debanandapur	17	15	0	2	0		0	AITC
2	Bandel	26	25	0	0			1	AITC
3	Kodalia-II	25	19	4	2	0		0	AITC
4	Kodalia-I	30	24	3	1	0	1	1	AITC
5	Chandrahati-I	17	12	2	3	0		0	AITC
6	Chandrahati-II	15	11	1	3	0		0	AITC
7	Digsui-Hoerah	22	16	0	2	0	2	2	AITC
8	Mogra-I	19	18	0	0			1	AITC
9	Mogra-II	19	13	6	0			0	AITC
10	Saptagram	30	25	2	2	0		1	AITC
Total		220	178	18	15	0	3	6	

== Rural poverty ==
As per poverty estimates obtained from household survey for families living below poverty line in 2005, rural poverty in Chinsurah Mogra CD Block was 15.99%.

== Economy ==
=== Livelihood ===
Livelihood in Chinsurah Mogra CD Block
1. Cultivators (3.73%)
2. Agricultural labourers (12.7%)
3. Household industries (3.79%)
4. Other workers (79.8%)

In Chinsurah Mogra CD Block in 2011, amongst the class of total workers, cultivators formed 3.73%, agricultural labourers 12.70%, household industry workers 3.79% and other workers 79.78%.

=== Infrastructure ===
There are 52 inhabited villages in Chinsurah Mogra CD Block. 100% villages have power supply. 44 villages have more than one source of drinking water (tap, well, tube well, hand pump), six villages have only a tube well/borewell and two villages have only a hand pump. One village has a post office and six villages have sub-post offices. 47 villages have landlines, 38 villages have public call offices and 51 villages have mobile phone coverage. 45 villages have pucca roads and 21 villages have bus service (public/ private). Two villages have agricultural credit societies, five villages have commercial/ co-operative banks and one village has an ATM.

=== Agriculture ===
In 2013–14, the small percentage of persons engaged in agriculture in Chinsurah Mogra CD Block could be classified as follows: bargadars 8.92%, patta (document) holders 12.11%, small farmers (possessing land between 1 and 2 hectares) 1.97%, marginal farmers (possessing land up to 1 hectare) 18.47% and agricultural labourers 58.53%.

Chinsurah Mogra CD Block had 28 fertiliser depots, 10 seed stores and 44 fair price shops in 2013-14.

In 2013–14, Chinsurah Mogra CD Block produced 6,781 tonnes of Aman paddy, the main winter crop from 2,572 hectares, 3,791 tonnes of Boro paddy (spring crop) from 1,519 hectares, 5 tonnes of wheat from 2 hectares, 560 tonnes of jute from 28 hectares and 106,280 tonnes of potatoes from 3,831 hectares. It also produced pulses and oilseeds.

In 2013–14, the total area irrigated in Chinsurah Mogra CD Block was 3,104 hectares, out of which 20 hectares were irrigated by canal water, 150 hectares by tank water, 740 hectares by river lift irrigation, 1,350 hectares by deep tube wells, 644 hectares by shallow tube wells and 200 hectares by other means.

Important handicrafts of Hooghly District
- Zari work on sari - Pandua, Pursurah, Jangipara, Tarakeswar and other blocks - 3,000 families involved
- Chikon embroidery – Babnan, Pandua, Singur - 2,500 families involved
- Silk and cotton printing – Serampore (Chanditala) - 300 families involved
- Brass and bell metal – Manikpat, Goghat, Arambagh - 150 families involved
- Conch shell – Pandua, Khanakul, Makla, Chandannagar
- Jute diversified products – Baidyabati, Mogra
- Terracotta – Chinsurah, Chandannagar, Baidyabati, Mogra

=== Banking ===
In 2013–14, Chinsurah Mogra CD Block had offices of 16 commercial banks.

== Transport ==
Chinsurah Mogra CD Block has two ferry services and five originating/terminating bus routes.

The Howrah-Bardhaman main line passes through this CD block and there are stations at Chuchura, Hooghly, Bandel, Adisaptagram, Mogra and Talandu. The stations are mostly located in the cities/municipal towns and are outside the CD block.

It is part of Kolkata Suburban Railway system.

State Highway 13 (West Bengal)/Grand Trunk Road passes through this CD block. The Dankuni-Mogra sector is also known as Delhi Road.

== Education ==
In 2013–14, Chinsurah Mogra CD Block had 79 primary schools with 9,635 students, one middle schools with 53 students, seven high schools with 3,158 students and 15 higher secondary schools with 17,020 students. Balagarh CD Block had one general college with 3,906 students, 5 technical/ professional institutions with 3,296 students and 320 institutions for special and non-formal education with 4,342 students.

Sreegopal Banerjee College, a general degree college, was established at Bagati, Mogra, in 1958.

In Chinsurah Mogra CD Block, amongst the 52 inhabited villages, nine had no school, 13 had more than one primary school, 33 had at least one primary school, 10 had at least one primary and one middle school, and six had at least one middle and one secondary school.

== Healthcare ==
In 2014, Chinsurah Mogra CD Block had one block primary health centre, two primary health centres and four private nursing homes with total 119 beds and seven doctors (excluding private bodies). It had 33 family welfare subcentres. 3,653 patients were treated indoor and 221,954 patients were treated outdoor in the hospitals, health centres and subcentres of the CD block.

Chinsurah Mogra CD Block has Bandel ESI Hospital (with 250 beds) at PO Bandel, Mogra Rural Hospital (with 30 beds) at Mogra, Digsui Primary Health Centre (with 10 beds) and R.N. Debdas PHC (Naldanga), at PO Bandel (with 6 beds).

Chinsurah Mogra CD Block is one of the areas of Hooghly district where ground water is affected by low level of arsenic contamination. The WHO guideline for arsenic in drinking water is 10 mg/ litre, and the Indian Standard value is 50 mg/ litre. In Hooghly district, 16 blocks have arsenic levels above WHO guidelines and 11 blocks above Indian standard value. The maximum concentration in Chinsurah Mogra CD Block is 38 mg/litre.
