= Kola, Hooghly =

Kola
- Census Town
- Location in West Bengal, India Kola (India)
- Coordinates: 22.99125°N 88.364969°E
- Country: India
- State: West Bengal
- District: Hooghly

Population (2011)
  - Total: 7,271

Languages
  - Official: Bengali, English
- Time zone: UTC+5:30 (IST)
- Telephone code: 03454
- Vehicle registration: WB
- Lok Sabha constituency: Hooghly
- Vidhan Sabha constituency: Balagarh
- Website: hooghly.gov.in

Kola is a census town in Chinsurah Mogra CD Block in Chinsurah subdivision of Hooghly district in the Indian state of West Bengal.

== Geography ==
Cities and towns in the Chinsurah subdivision (except Polba Dadpur and Dhaniakhali CD Blocks) in Hooghly district
M: municipal city/ town, CT: census town, R: rural/ urban centre,
Owing to space constraints in the small map, the actual locations in a larger map may vary slightly

=== Location ===
Kola is located at 22.99125°N 88.364969°E.

Hansghara, Kola, Alikhoja, Amodghata, Shankhanagar and Chak Bansberia form a cluster of census towns on the eastern side of Bansberia and includes Mogra and Bara Khejuria (outgrowth).

The area is composed of flat alluvial plains that form a part of the Gangetic Delta. The high west bank of the tidal Hooghly River is highly industrialised.

=== Urbanisation ===
There are 13 statutory towns and 64 census towns in Hooghly district. The right bank of the Hooghly River has been industrialised over a long period. With the leading European powers dominating the area's industry, trade and commerce for over two centuries, it is amongst the leading industrialised areas in the state. At the same time the land is fertile and agricultural production is significant.

In Chinsurah subdivision 68.63% of the population is rural and the urban population is 31.37%. It has 2 statutory and 23 census towns. In Chinsurah Mogra CD Block 64.87% of the population is urban and 35.13% is rural. Amongst the four remaining CD Blocks in the subdivision two were overwhelmingly rural and two were wholly rural.

The map alongside shows a portion of Chinsurah subdivision. All places marked in the map are linked in the larger full screen map.

=== Climate ===
Climate data for Kola, Hooghly (1981–2010, extremes 1968–2009)
Month	Jan	Feb	Mar	Apr	May	Jun	Jul	Aug	Sep	Oct	Nov	Dec	Year
Record high °C (°F)	33.3 (91.9)	36.3 (97.3)	39.8 (103.6)	44.5 (112.1)	45.5 (113.9)	46.2 (115.2)	42.3 (108.1)	37.3 (99.1)	37.1 (98.8)	38.4 (101.1)	38.5 (101.3)	36.5 (97.7)	46.2 (115.2)
Mean daily maximum °C (°F)	24.6 (76.3)	28.1 (82.6)	32.4 (90.3)	35.1 (95.2)	35.2 (95.4)	33.6 (92.5)	31.9 (89.4)	31.8 (89.2)	31.7 (89.1)	31.5 (88.7)	29.3 (84.7)	26.0 (78.8)	30.9 (87.6)
Mean daily minimum °C (°F)	12.5 (54.5)	16.1 (61.0)	20.6 (69.1)	24.0 (75.2)	25.3 (77.5)	26.0 (78.8)	26.0 (78.8)	26.1 (79.0)	25.7 (78.3)	23.5 (74.3)	18.4 (65.1)	13.5 (56.3)	21.5 (70.7)
Record low °C (°F)	4.8 (40.6)	5.5 (41.9)	11.0 (51.8)	15.1 (59.2)	14.5 (58.1)	14.2 (57.6)	12.8 (55.0)	20.8 (69.4)	16.7 (62.1)	16.6 (61.9)	10.0 (50.0)	6.4 (43.5)	4.8 (40.6)
Average rainfall mm (inches)	11.9 (0.47)	26.8 (1.06)	41.7 (1.64)	63.6 (2.50)	131.0 (5.16)	272.7 (10.74)	294.0 (11.57)	261.4 (10.29)	251.7 (9.91)	133.6 (5.26)	26.2 (1.03)	6.8 (0.27)	1,521.1 (59.89)
Average rainy days	1.0	1.5	2.3	3.6	6.9	11.3	15.2	14.7	11.3	5.7	0.8	0.5	74.7
Average relative humidity (%) (at 17:30 IST)	60	57	62	67	69	78	83	83	83	78	70	63	71
Source: India Meteorological Department

== Demographics ==
As per 2011 Census of India Kola had a total population of 7,271 of which 3,642 (50%) were males and 3,629 (50%) were females. Population below 6 years was 687. The total number of literates in Kola was 5,327 (80.91% of the population over 6 years).

== Transport ==
Mogra railway station is the nearest railway station.
