= Bans Beria railway station =

Railway station in West Bengal, India

Bansberia
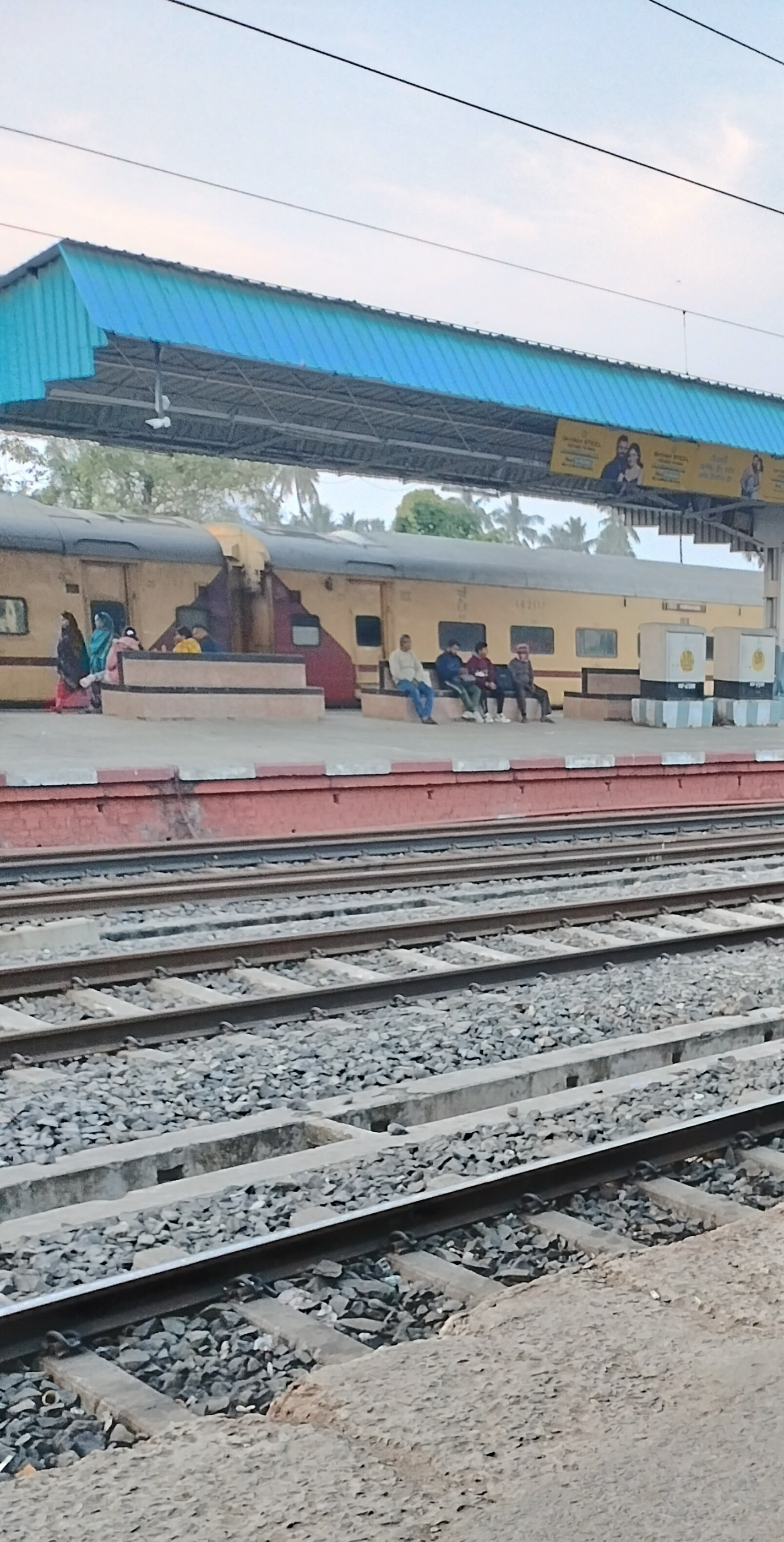
- Bansberia railway station (Regd as BANSH BARIA in the Indian railway directory)

General information
- Location: Station Road, Bansberia, Hooghly district, West Bengal; India
- Coordinates: 22.957168°N 88.395239°E
- Elevation: 13 metres (43 ft)
- System: Kolkata Suburban Railway
- Owner: Indian Railways
- Operator: Eastern Railway
- Line: 2
- Platforms: 3
- Tracks: 2

Construction
- Structure type: Standard (on-ground station)
- Parking: No
- Cycle facilities: No

Other information
- Status: Functioning
- Station code: BSAE
- Zone(s): Eastern Railway
- Division(s): Howrah

Services
Preceding station	Kolkata Suburban Railway	Following station
Bandel towards Howrah Junction	Eastern Line Bandel–Katwa line	Islampara Halt towards Katwa Junction
Route map
Location
- Location within West Bengal Location within India

Bansberia railway station is railway station on Bandel–Katwa line, in Bengal, India connecting from Bandel to Katwa, and under the jurisdiction of Howrah railway division of Eastern Railway zone. It is situated at Bansberia, Hooghly district in the Indian state of West Bengal. It serves Bansberia town, Boropara, Chak Bansberia and surrounding area. The distance between Howrah and Bansberia railway station is approximately 44 km.

== History ==
The Hooghly–Katwa Railway constructed a line from Bandel to Katwa in 1913. This line including Bansberia railway station was electrified in 1994–96 with 25 kV overhead line.
