= State Highway 13 (West Bengal) =

Road in West Bengal, India

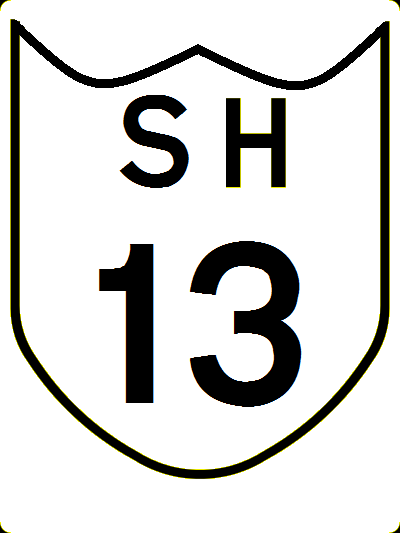
State Highway 13

Route information
- Length: 82.61 km (51.33 mi)

Major junctions
- From: Junction with NH 114 and NH 19 at Palsit
- SH 15 at Memari; Durgapur Expressway-GT Road connector near Memari; Boinchi-Kalna Road, Boinchi-Dhaniakhali Road and Boinchi-Bisara Road at Boinchi; Kuntighat-Mogra Road, Mogra-Gurup Road, Mogra-Polba Road and Tribeni Ghat Road at Mogra; Grand Trunk Road at Saptagram; Chunchura-Dhaniakhali Road at Sugandha; SH 2 at Baidyabati
- To: Junction with NH 19, NH 16 and SH 15 at Dankuni.

Location
- Country: India
- State: West Bengal
- Districts: Bardhaman, Hooghly

Highway system
- Roads in India; Expressways; National; State; Asian; State Highways in West Bengal

State Highway 13 (West Bengal) is a state highway in West Bengal, India.

== Route ==
As per Government of India’s Gazette notification in 2010, NH 114 runs from its junction with NH 14 near Mallarpur in Birbhum to its junction with NH 19 near Bardhaman. As per the Public Works Department of the Government of West Bengal, SH 13 runs from Palsit to Dankuni. As per West Bengal Traffic Police, SH 13 runs from Mallarpur to Dankuni. Here we are considering the route for SH 13 from Palsit to Dankuni. For those who are interested in the route from Mallarpur to Palsit may see NH 114.

SH 13 originates from junction with NH 114 and NH 19 at Palsit (in Bardhaman district) and passes through Rasulpur, Memari, Boinchi, Pandua, Mogra, Saptagram, Sugandha and Baidyabati, and terminates at the junction with NH 19, NH 16, Belghoria Expressway and SH 15 at Dankuni (in Hooghly district).

The total length of SH 13 is 82.61 km.

Districts traversed by SH 13 are:
Bardhaman district (0 – 16.34 km)
Hooghly district (16.34 – 82.61 km)

== Road section ==
It is divided into three road section:

Road Section	District	CD Block	Length (km)
Palsit-Debipur (old GT Road)	Purba Bardhaman	Burdwan II, Memari I,	16.34
Debipur-Mogra (old GT Road)	Hooghly	Pandua	37.61
Mogra-Dankuni (Delhi Road)	Hooghly	Chinsurah Mogra	44

=== Delhi Road ===
Delhi Road, a.k.a. Old Delhi Road is a 4 laned 44-kilometre-long (27 mi) highway in Hooghly district, West Bengal, India. The road falls under Kolkata metropolitan area and connects one end of Kalyani Expressway in Mogra to Durgapur Expressway in Dankuni. Before the formulation of Golden Quadrilateral and opening of Durgapur Expressway, the road was major thoroughfare from Kolkata to Hooghly and thereafter to the old GT Road. In 2020, Delhi Road was renovated and expanded.

The endpoints of the road are Mogra and Dankuni. From Dankuni, the road starts with a system interchange with Durgapur Expressway and bypasses TN Mukherjee Road through Dankuni State Highway Flyover. Some connector or spur roads have met or emerged or crossed from this road such as:

- Naity Road connects Konnagar
- Bamunari Road connects Rishra
- Firingi Road connects Serampore
- Road no. 31 connects Serampore and Durgapur Expressway
- Bhola Road connects Chandannagar
- Shankar Road connects Chuchura

Some of the other major roads which have met Delhi Road are:

- West Bengal SH 2 near Baidyabati
- Chuchura Dhaniakhali Road
- West Bengal SH 6 (GT Road ar Saptagram)

== See also ==
- List of state highways in West Bengal
