= Mahesh Sri Ramkrishna Ashram Vidyalaya (higher secondary) =

Mahesh Sri Ramkrishna Ashram Vidyalaya (HS)

Location
- 40, Ramkrishna Road, Mouza- Mahesh; Post: Rishra, Serampore – 712248; West Bengal, India; 22.730271°N 88.347421°E

Information
- Established: 2 January 1952
- Colors: Black, white
- Athletics: Football, cricket, field.

Mahesh Sri Ramkrishna Ashram Vidyalaya (Higher Secondary) is an educational institution in Hooghly District of West Bengal, India. Swami Premghanananda founded the institute in 1952 at Rishra. The institution got the affiliation from the W.B.B.S.E. in 1959 as a Madhyamik (secondary) school. And the affiliation from Higher Secondary Council in 2005 as a higher secondary school. At present the school has five sections (one nursery, two primary schools, one secondary and one higher secondary) under one umbrella.

== History ==
Swami Premghanananda was disciple of second president of Belur Math Swami Shivananda Maharaj. In 1941, he started publishing a monthly magazine 'Kishore Sava' with the help of some active youths. Later, in 1943, the magazine grew up to be 'Kishore Bangla Press' & its office was set up at 25, Balram Dey street, Kolkata. In December 1950, a meeting was held in presence of president Shyamananda at the office of 'Kishore Bangla' about formation of an educational institution. It was decided that Sri Ramkrishna Ashram would be established in Mahesh, directed by Swami Premghanananda.

Mahesh Sri Ramkrishna Ashram Vidyalaya was registered on 17 September' 1951 (Registration No – 19979/400 of 1951–1952). Swami Premghanananda died at 7:45 am on 22 April 1956. He was 56 years old.

Swami Asitananda was 2nd president and principal of the institution after the death of Swami Shyamananda. Swami Muktatmananda became the third president in 1973. Swami Avishthananda was selected as next president in November 1989. Committee decided Dandiswami Damodar as president after death of Swami Avishthananda in 2001.

== Subjects ==
As of 2020, the following subjects (including optional) are taught in higher secondary.

1.	BENGALI (A)
2.	BIO-SCIENCE
3.	CHEMISTRY
4.	ECONOMICS
5.	ENGLISH (B)
6.	GEOGRAPHY
7.	HISTORY
8.	MATHEMATICS
9.	PHILOSOPHY
10.	PHYSICS
11.	POLITICAL SCIENCE
12.	SANSKRIT
13.	STATISTICS
