= Saptagram (modern) =

- Village
- Location in West Bengal, India Saptagram (India)
- Coordinates: 22.96225°N 88.368769°E
- Country: India
- State: West Bengal
- District: Hooghly

Population (2011)
  - Total: 1,758

Languages
  - Official: Bengali, English
- Time zone: UTC+5:30 (IST)
- Telephone/STD code: 03213
- Lok Sabha constituency: Hooghly
- Vidhan Sabha constituency: Saptagram
- Website: hooghly.gov.in

Saptagram is a village and a gram panchayat in Chinsurah Mogra CD Block in Chinsurah subdivision of Hooghly district in the state of West Bengal, India.

== History ==
In ancient times, there was a flourishing port town at Saptagram. The Saraswati River started drying up from the 17th century and ships, which navigated up the river, could no longer do so. By the early twentieth century, the place had dwindled to a group of insignificant huts.

== Demographics ==
As per the 2011 Census of India, Saptagram had a total population of 1,758 of which 892 (51%) were males and 866 (49%) were females. Population below 6 years was 135. The total number of literates in Saptagram was 1,459 (89.90% of the population over 6 years).

== Transport ==
Adisaptagram railway station is situated on the Howrah-Bardhaman main line. It is part of Kolkata Suburban Railway system.

State Highway 13 (West Bengal) passes through Saptagram and meets Grand Trunk Road that connects it to State Highway 6 (West Bengal).
