= Madhusudanpur =

- Census Town
- Location in West Bengal, India Madhusudanpur (India)
- Coordinates: 23.01°N 88.40°E
- Country: India
- State: West Bengal
- District: Hooghly

Population (2011)
  - Total: 6,686

Languages
  - Official: Bengali, English
- Time zone: UTC+5:30 (IST)
- Vehicle registration: WB
- Website: wb.gov.in

Madhusudanpur is a census town in Chinsurah Mogra CD Block in Chinsurah subdivision of Hooghly district in the Indian state of West Bengal.

== Geography ==
Cities and towns in the Chinsurah subdivision (except Polba Dadpur and Dhaniakhali CD Blocks) in Hooghly district
M: municipal city/ town, CT: census town, R: rural/ urban centre,
Owing to space constraints in the small map, the actual locations in a larger map may vary slightly

=== Location ===
Madhusudanpur is located at 23.01°N 88.40°E.

The area is composed of flat alluvial plains that form a part of the Gangetic Delta. The high west bank of the tidal Hooghly River is highly industrialised.

=== Urbanisation ===
There are 13 statutory towns and 64 census towns in Hooghly district. The right bank of the Hooghly River has been industrialised over a long period. With the leading European powers dominating the area’s industry, trade and commerce for over two centuries, it is amongst the leading industrialised areas in the state. At the same time the land is fertile and agricultural production is significant.

In Chinsurah subdivision, 68.63% of the population is rural and the rest urban. It has 2 statutory and 23 census towns. In Chinsurah Mogra CD Block 64.87% of the population is urban and 35.13% is rural. Amongst the four remaining CD Blocks in the subdivision two were overwhelmingly rural and two were wholly rural.

The map alongside shows a portion of Chinsurah subdivision. All places marked in the map are linked in the larger full screen map.

== Demographics ==
As per 2011 Census of India Madhusudanpur had a total population of 6,685 of which 3,419 (51%) were males and 3,266 (49%) were females. Population below 6 years was 522. The total number of literates in Madhusudanpur was 5,472 (88.79% of the population over 6 years).

As of 2001 India census, Madhusudanpur had a population of 6,806. Males constitute 52% of the population and females 48%. Madhusudanpur has an average literacy rate of 76%, higher than the national average of 59.5%: male literacy is 82%, and female literacy is 69%. In Madhusudanpur, 10% of the population is under 6 years of age.
