= Raghunathpur (PS-Magra) =

- Census Town
- Location in West Bengal, India Raghunathpur (India)
- Coordinates: 23.01636°N 88.40279°E
- Country: India
- State: West Bengal
- District: Hooghly

Population (2011)
  - Total: 14,919

Languages
  - Official: Bengali, English
- Time zone: UTC+5:30 (IST)
- Vehicle registration: WB
- Website: wb.gov.in

Raghunathpur is a census town in Chinsurah Mogra CD Block in Chinsurah subdivision of Hooghly district in the Indian state of West Bengal.

== Geography ==
Cities and towns in the Chinsurah subdivision (except Polba Dadpur and Dhaniakhali CD Blocks) in Hooghly district
M: municipal city/ town, CT: census town, R: rural/ urban centre,
Owing to space constraints in the small map, the actual locations in a larger map may vary slightly

=== Location ===
Raghunathpur is located at 23.01636°N 88.40279°E

The area is composed of flat alluvial plains that form a part of the Gangetic Delta. The high west bank of the tidal Hooghly River is highly industrialised.

=== Urbanisation ===
There are 13 statutory towns and 64 census towns in Hooghly district. The right bank of the Hooghly River has been industrialised over a long period. With the leading European powers dominating the area’s industry, trade and commerce for over two centuries, it is amongst the leading industrialised areas in the state. The land is also fertile and agricultural production is significant.

In Chinsurah subdivision, 68.63% of the population is rural, and the urban population is 31.37%. It has 2 statutory and 23 census towns. In Chinsurah Mogra CD Block 64.87% of the population is urban and 35.13% is rural. Amongst the four remaining CD Blocks in the subdivision, two were overwhelmingly rural and two were wholly rural.

The map alongside shows a portion of Chinsurah subdivision. All places marked in the map are linked in the larger full screen map.

== Demographics ==
As per 2011 Census of India Raghunathpur had a population of 14,919 of which 7,733 (52%) were males and 7,186 (48%) were females. The population below 6 years was 1,304. The total number of literates in Raghunathpur was 12,141 (89.17% of the population over 6 years).

As of 2001 India census, Raghunathpur (PS-Magra) had a population of 14,109. Males constitute 54% of the population and females 46%. Raghunathpur (PS-Magra) has an average literacy rate of 75%, higher than the national average of 59.5%: male literacy is 81%, and female literacy is 67%. In Raghunathpur (PS-Magra), 11% of the population is under 6 years of age.
