= Baidyabati =

- City
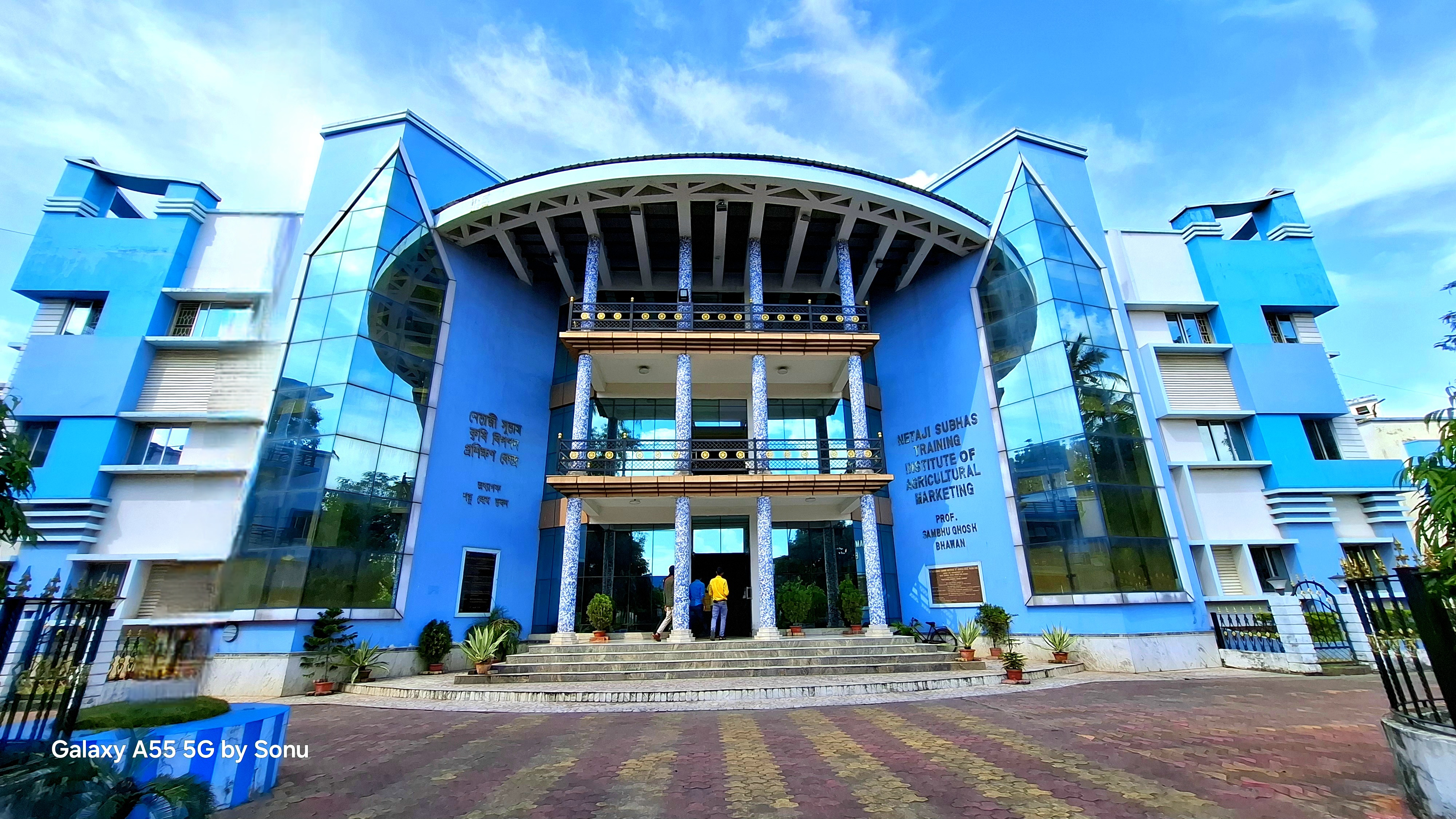
- NSTIAM Campus

- Location in West Bengal, India Baidyabati (India)
- Coordinates: 22.8053°N 88.3198°E
- Country: India
- State: West Bengal
- Division: Burdwan
- District: Hooghly

Government
  - Type: Municipality
  - Body: Baidyabati Municipality

Area
  - Total: 12.03 km^{2} (4.64 sq mi)
- Elevation: 15 m (49 ft)

Population (2011)
  - Total: 121,081
  - Density: 10,060/km^{2} (26,070/sq mi)

Languages
  - Official: Bengali, English
- Time zone: UTC+5:30 (IST)
- PIN: 712222
- Telephone code: +91 33
- ISO 3166 code: IN-WB
- Vehicle registration: WB
- Lok Sabha constituency: Sreerampur
- Vidhan Sabha constituency: Champdani

Baidyabati is a city and a municipality of Hooghly district in the State of West Bengal in India. It is under Serampore police station of Srirampore subdivision. It is a part of the area covered by Kolkata Metropolitan Development Authority (KMDA).

== Geography ==
=== Location ===
Baidyabati is located at 22.8053°N 88.3198°E.

== Demographics ==
As per 2011 Census of India, Baidyabati had a total population of 121,110 of which 62,885 (52%) were males and 58,625 (48%) were females. The population below 6 years was 9,017. The total number of literates in Baidyabati was 98,928 (88.26% of the population over 6 years).

=== Languages ===
Languages spoken in Baidyabati city (2011)
1. Bengali (89.8%)
2. Hindi (8.85%)
3. Urdu (0.79%)
4. Telugu (0.52%)
5. Gujarati (0.23%)
6. Others (0.32%)

As of 2001 India census, Baidyabati had a population of 108,231. Males constitute 52% of the population and females 48%. Baidyabati has an average literacy rate of 79%, higher than the national average of 59.5%; with 54% of the males and 46% of females literate. 8% of the population is under 6 years of age.

=== Kolkata Urban Agglomeration ===
The following Municipalities and Census Towns in Hooghly district were part of Kolkata Urban Agglomeration in 2011 census: Chandannagar (MC), Bansberia (M), Hugli-Chinsurah (M), Bara Khejuria (Out Growth), Shankhanagar (CT), Amodghata (CT), Chak Bansberia (CT), Naldanga (CT), Kodalia (CT), Kulihanda (CT), Simla (CT), Dharmapur (CT), Bhadreswar (M), Champdani (M), Chandannagar (M Corp.), Baidyabati (M), Serampore (M), Rishra (M), Rishra (CT), Bamunari (CT), Dakshin Rajyadharpur (CT), Nabagram Colony (CT), Konnagar (M), Uttarpara Kotrung (M), Raghunathpur (PS-Dankuni) (CT), Kanaipur (CT) and Keota (CT).

== Transport ==
- State Highway 6/ G.T. Road passes through Baidyabati. Private Bus number 2 (Chunchura Court - Dakshineswar) plies through here.
- State Highway 13/ Delhi Road passes through Baidyabati. State Highway 2 connects Baidyabati (Delhi Road) to Durgapur Expressway at Singur and National Highway 14 at Bishnupur.
- Baidyabati railway station is on the Howrah-Bardhaman main line. It is part of Kolkata Suburban Railway system.

== Notable people ==
- Arup Raha, Air chief marshal (India)
