= Mogra, Hooghly =

Mogra
- Village
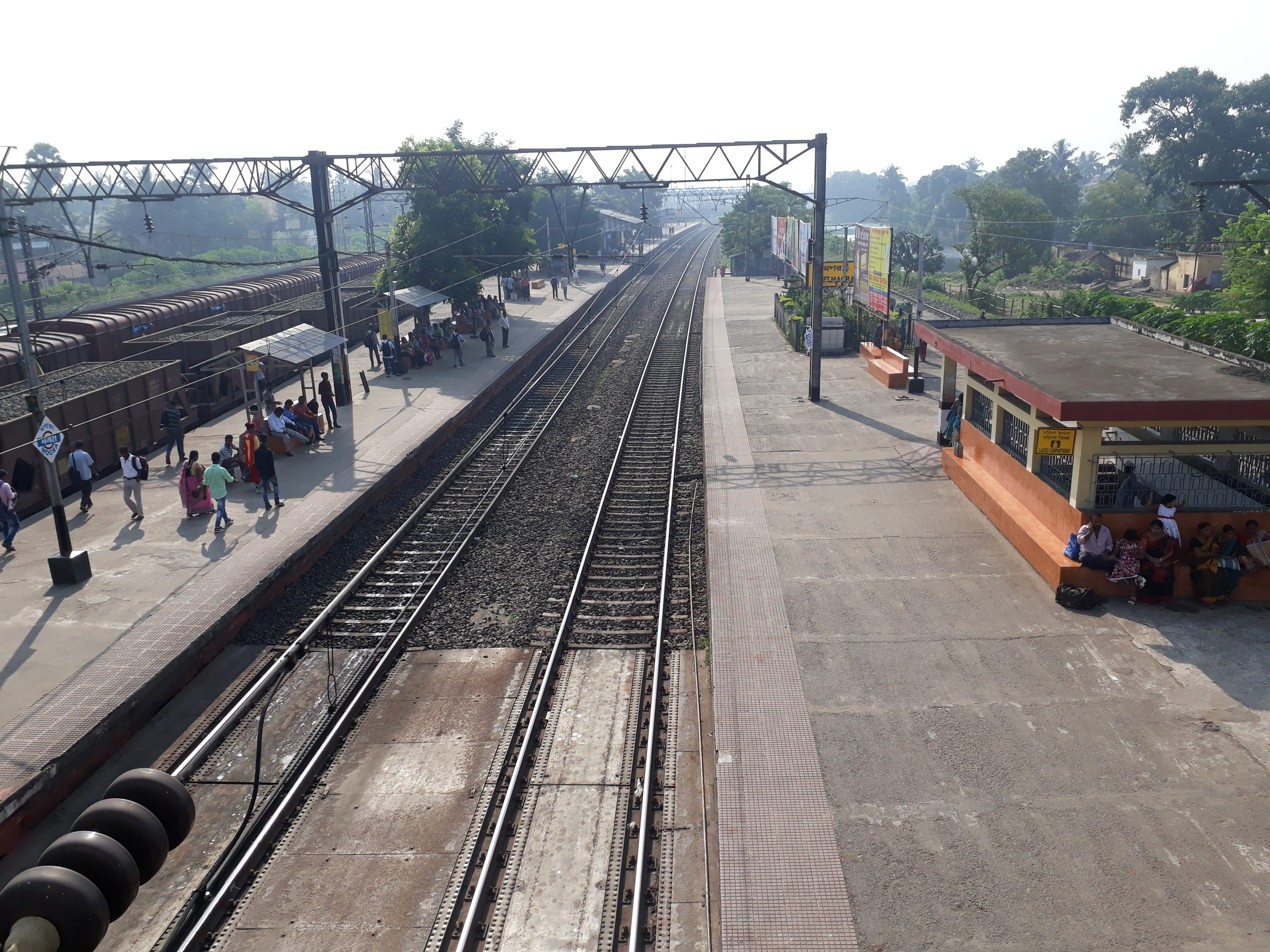
- Mogra railway station

- Location in West Bengal, India Mogra (India)
- Coordinates: 22.97925°N 88.374769°E
- Country: India
- State: West Bengal
- District: Hooghly

Government
  - Type: Gram Panchyet
  - Body: Chinsurah-Magra Panchyet Samity
- Elevation: 12 m (39 ft)

Population (2001)
  - Total: 112,267

Languages
  - Official: Bengali
- Time zone: UTC+5:30 (IST)

Mogra (or Magra) is a gram panchayat, or village, which is home to the headquarters of the Chinsurah-Mogra community development block in the Chinsurah subdivision of the Hooghly district in the Indian state of West Bengal. It has a station on the Howrah-Bardhaman Main Rail Line, 47 km from Howrah Station and 7 km from Bandel Station.

All India Radio has located some high-powered transmitters in Mogra, which carry a mix of domestic and external services.

== Geography ==
Cities and towns in the Chinsurah subdivision (except Polba Dadpur and Dhaniakhali CD Blocks) in Hooghly district
M: municipal city/ town, CT: census town, R: rural/ urban centre,
Owing to space constraints in the small map, the actual locations in a larger map may vary slightly

=== Location ===
Mogra is located on the outskirts of Hooghly District. Mogra is an hour's drive from Kolkata, the principal commercial, cultural and educational centre of Eastern India. The River Kunti flows through the western side of the town.

Mogra is located at 22.97925°N 88.374769°E.

The area is composed of flat alluvial plains that form a part of the Gangetic Delta. The high west bank of the tidal Hooghly River is highly industrialised.

Hansghara, Kola, Gajaghanta, Alikhoja, Amodghata, Shankhanagar and Chak Bansberia form a cluster of census towns on the eastern side of Bansberia and includes Mogra and Bara Khejuria (outgrowth).

=== Police station ===
The Mogra Police Station holds a mediocre amount of power in its region. Its jurisdiction over the Bansberia Municipal area and a part of Chinsurah Mogra CD Block.

== Education ==
=== Colleges and schools ===
The Abacus Institute of Engineering and Management is situated in Mogra. The Academy of Technology engineering college is one station away. Near the Academy of Technology is a rural library. Two government-sponsored rural libraries operate there.

Sreegopal Banerjee College, a general degree college, was established in 1958. The college offers BA (Honours & general), B.Sc. (Honours & general) and B.Com. (Honours & general) courses. It offers honours courses in Bengali, English, Sanskrit, history, philosophy, political science, economics, chemistry, physics, mathematics, botany, zoology and BA (general) and B.Sc. (general) in addition to accountancy honours and B.Com. (general) courses.

The majority of schools are Narula public school, Pearl Rosary English Medium School (H.S), Mogra Uttam Chandra High School, the Bagati Ram Gopal Ghosh High School, the Elite Public School, the Bimalabala Primary School, S. Saheb Hindi High School, the Pravabati Balika Vidyalaya, the Shib Chandra Girls High School, the Shib Sohagini Junior Basic School, The Tarinisatra High School and Digsui High School.

== Festivals ==
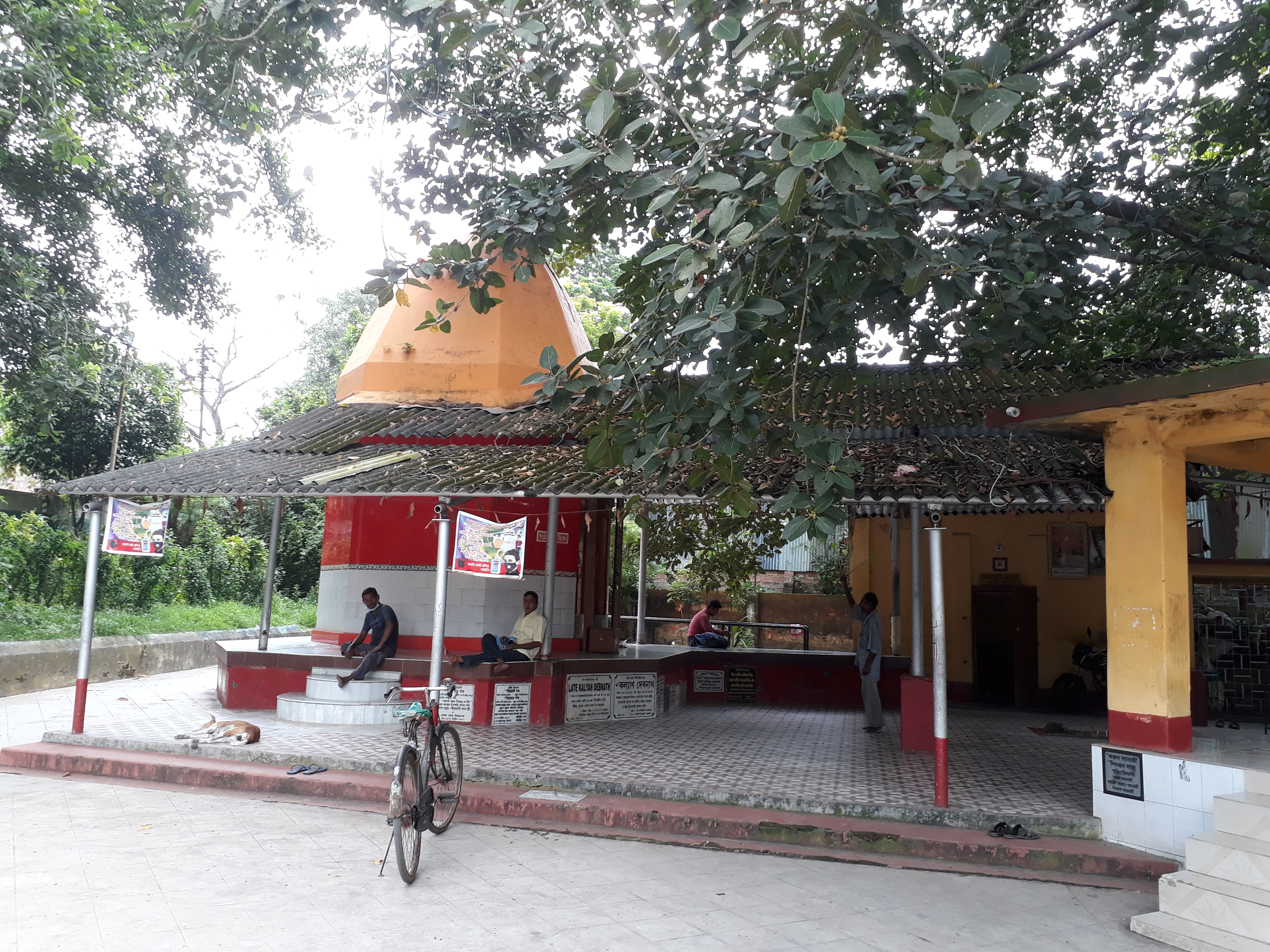
Historical Dakat Kali temple at Mogra

Saraswati Puja is conducted annually. The festival is open to everyone and organized by local clubs. There are approximately 50 pujas in this area, about 20 among them are celebrated with themes and pandals. The occasion stays for 4 days and this is the main attraction of Mogra. Durga Puja is a festival in Mogra, with one of the larger-sized pandals being made at the Dakat Kali Temple pictured above.

== Healthcare ==
Mogra has a rural government hospital with more than 35 beds.

It also has a number of private nursing homes, which are as follows:

- Swasti Nursing Home (located in Mogra Station Road)
- Greenhealth Hospital
- Aesthetic Nursing Home (previously known as Ideal)
- Shantiniketan Nursing Home
- Manabik Nursing Home
- Swastha Katha Nursing Home
- Manaranjan Sheba Sadan

== Administration ==
Mogra is divided into two gram panchayats - Mogra 1 and Mogra 2. The village comes under both Balagarh and Saptagram. The area of Mogra G.P. 1 comes under Balagarh Assembly constituency and G.P. 2 comes under Saptagram Assembly constituency. Following is the ward wise breakup of Mogra Gram Panchayats 1 and 2 respectively.

=== Mogra No.1 Gram Panchayat ===
The latest elections were held in July 2023. The Trinamool Congress swept the panchayat area winning 18 wards out of 19.

Chairperson: Baisakhi Bag
Ward No.	Name of Councillor	Party	Remarks
1	Putul Ghosh	Trinamool Congress	
2	Monorama Ghosh	Trinamool Congress	
3	Bidyut Bag	Trinamool Congress	
4	Goutam Debnath	Trinamool Congress	
5	Baisakhi Bag	Trinamool Congress	
6	Soni Thakur	Trinamool Congress	
7	Sukla Malo	Trinamool Congress	
8	Somen Kundu	Trinamool Congress	
9	Asima Sarkar	Trinamool Congress	
10	Aparna Debnath	Trinamool Congress	
11	Amit Kumar Mondal	Independent	
12	Asha Roy	Trinamool Congress	
13	Khagen Bauldas	Trinamool Congress	
14	Shyamalika Dhara	Trinamool Congress	
15	Raju Das	Trinamool Congress	
16	Pratima Payal	Trinamool Congress	
17	Saibya Adak	Trinamool Congress	
18	Biswajit Payal	Trinamool Congress	
19	Raghunath Bhowmick	Trinamool Congress	

=== Mogra No.2 Gram Panchayat ===
The latest elections were held in July 2023. The Trinamool Congress won the panchayat winning 13 wards out of 19. The Bharatiya Janata Party won 6 wards.

Chairperson: Aparna Malo
Ward No.	Name of Councillor	Party	Remarks
1	Dipti Mukherjee	Trinamool Congress	
2	Shrikanta Bhattacharya	Bharatiya Janata Party	
3	Rupa Mahato	Trinamool Congress	
4	Mongala Mondal	Trinamool Congress	
5	Pritam Banerjee	Bharatiya Janata Party	
6	Jhuma Roy	Trinamool Congress	
7	Jayashree Pal	Trinamool Congress	
8	Sujit Kumar Das	Trinamool Congress	
9	Nitu Das Patra	Trinamool Congress	
10	Sankar Kahar	Trinamool Congress	
11	Dipali Choudhury	Trinamool Congress	
12	Sujay Kumar Pandit	Bharatiya Janata Party	
13	Banashri Malik	Bharatiya Janata Party	
14	Aparna Adhikary	Bharatiya Janata Party	
15	Banani Bhattacharjee	Trinamool Congress	
16	Aparna Malo	Bharatiya Janata Party	
17	Swapan Bag	Trinamool Congress	
18	Sadhana Adhikari	Trinamool Congress	
19	Rimpa Das Mondal	Trinamool Congress	

== People ==
Mogra has a diverse population. Mogra is home to mostly Bengalis but there is significant population of Biharis. The oldest groups in the area are Bagdis, Ghosh, Das and Sadhukhan. After the division of Bengal, many refugees settled from Bangladesh. Bagati is a locality inside Mogra and was the ancestral home of the Young Bengal leader Ramgopal Ghosh.

== Transport ==
The Grand Trunk Road, which is one of Asia's oldest and longest major roads, passes through Mogra.

Mogra is connected to a variety of destinations via public transport. All bus routes via Mogra, except Route Number 23 has been abolished. Hooghly Private Bus Number 23 is the only bus that connects Mogra to Chinsurah, Mahanad and Tarakeswar. Auto rickshaws, Toto, Magic are available for covering short distances. Mogra railway station is situated on Howrah-Bardhaman main line and local trains run from Mogra to Bardhaman and Howrah.

Netaji Subhash Chandra Bose International Airport is approximately an hour's drive from Mogra.
