= Bansberia =

- City
- Bansh Baria (Railway Name)
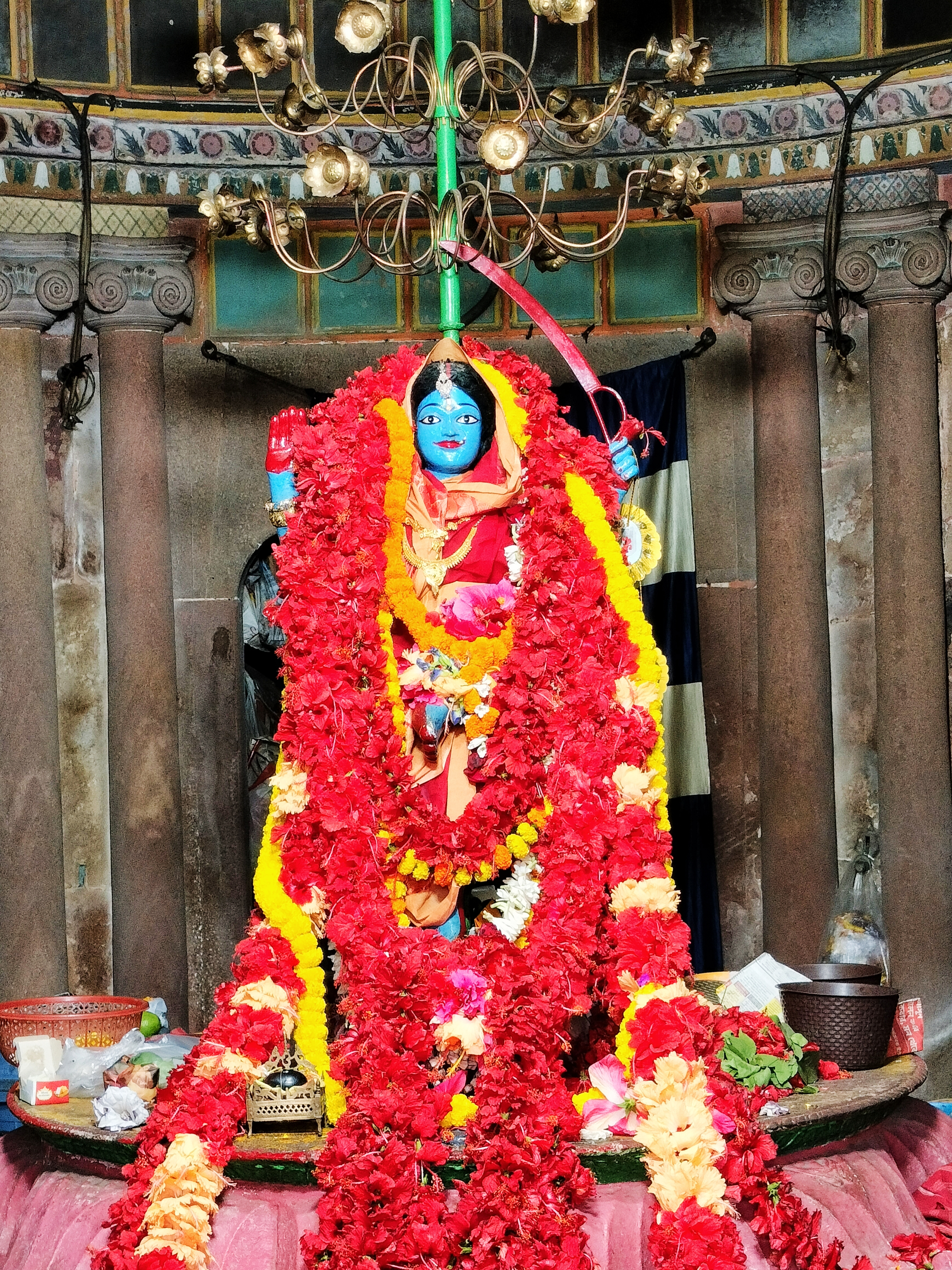
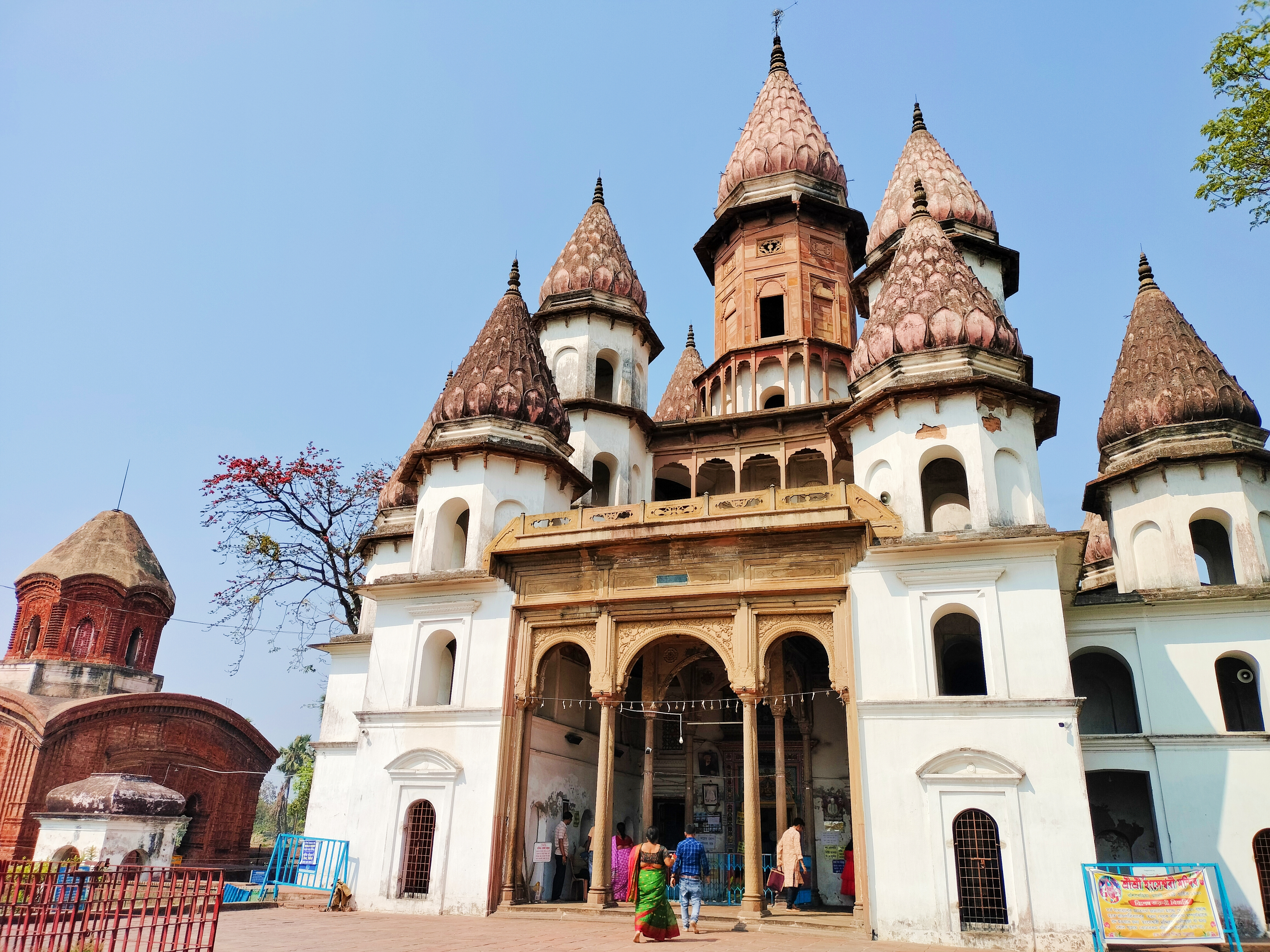
- Clockwise from top: Hanseswari Devi Idol and Hangseswari Temple
- Nicknames: বাঁশবেড়িয়া বংশবাটী
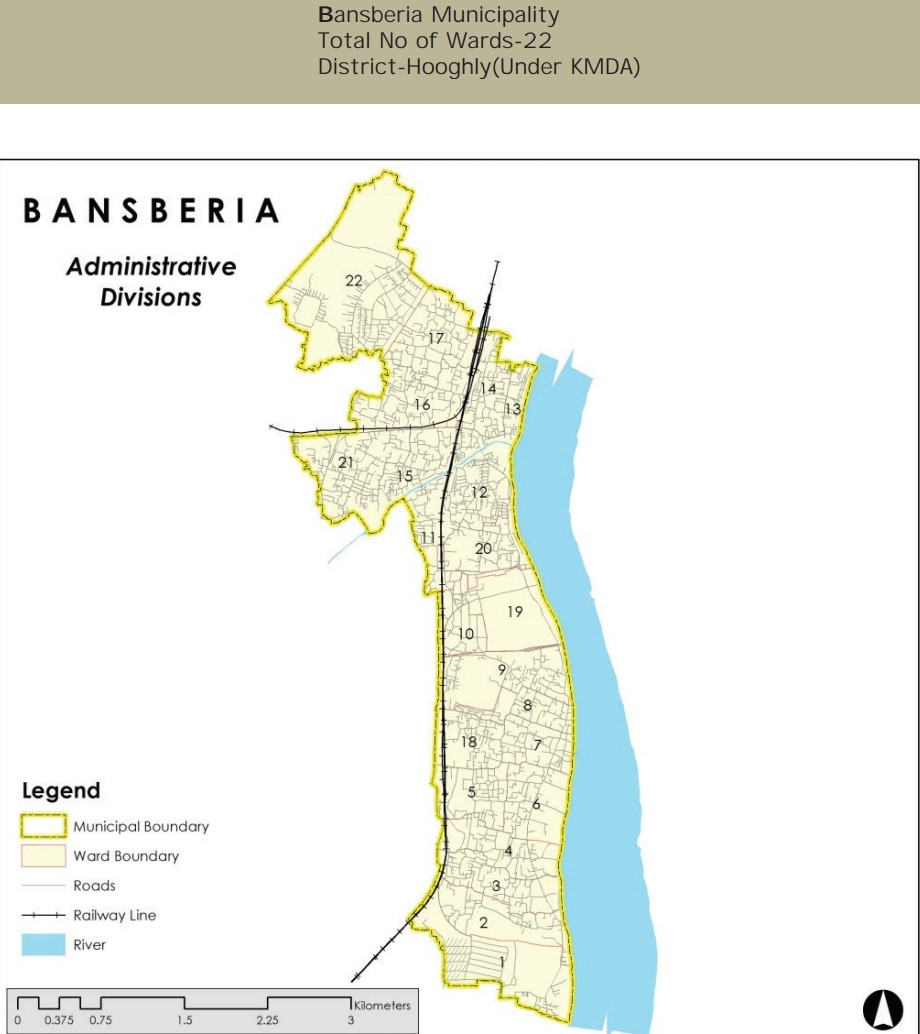
- Bansberia Municipality Area Map

- Location in West Bengal, India Bansberia (India)
- Coordinates: 22.97°N 88.40°E
- Country: India
- State: West Bengal
- Division: Burdwan
- District: Hooghly
- Established: 1869
- Founder: Raja Narasingha Dev

Government
  - Type: Municipality
  - Body: Bansberia Municipality
  - Chairman/Commissioner: Vacant
  - Vice Chairperson: Vacant

Area
  - Total: 9.07 km^{2} (3.50 sq mi)
  - Rank: 5th (in Hooghly District)
- Elevation: 6 m (20 ft)

Population (2011)
  - Total: 103,799
  - Density: 11,400/km^{2} (29,600/sq mi)

Languages
  - Official: Bengali, English
- Time zone: UTC+5:30 (IST)
- PIN: 712502, 712104, 712503
- Telephone code: +91 33
- Vehicle registration: WB16
- Lok Sabha constituency: Hooghly
- Member of Parliament: Rachana Banerjee (NDA)
- Vidhan Sabha constituency: Saptagram
- MLA: Swaraj Ghosh (BJP)

Bansberia is a small town and a municipality of Hooghly district in the Indian state of West Bengal. It is about 45 km (28 mi) away from Kolkata, at the western end of the Iswar Gupta Setu (Kalyani-Bansberia) Bridge. It is a part of the area covered by Kolkata Metropolitan Development Authority (KMDA). Bans Beria railway station is 4 km from Bandel Junction on the Bandel-Katwa Line. The area covered by two police stations — Chinsurah (ward no. 1–4) and Mogra (ward no. 5–22). The part of Chinsurah Police Station governed by Chandannagar Police Commissionerate and Mogra Police Station governed by Hooghly Rural Police District. Kartik Puja is the famous festival of Bansberia. Bansberia is also famous for its Kumbh Mela.

== History ==
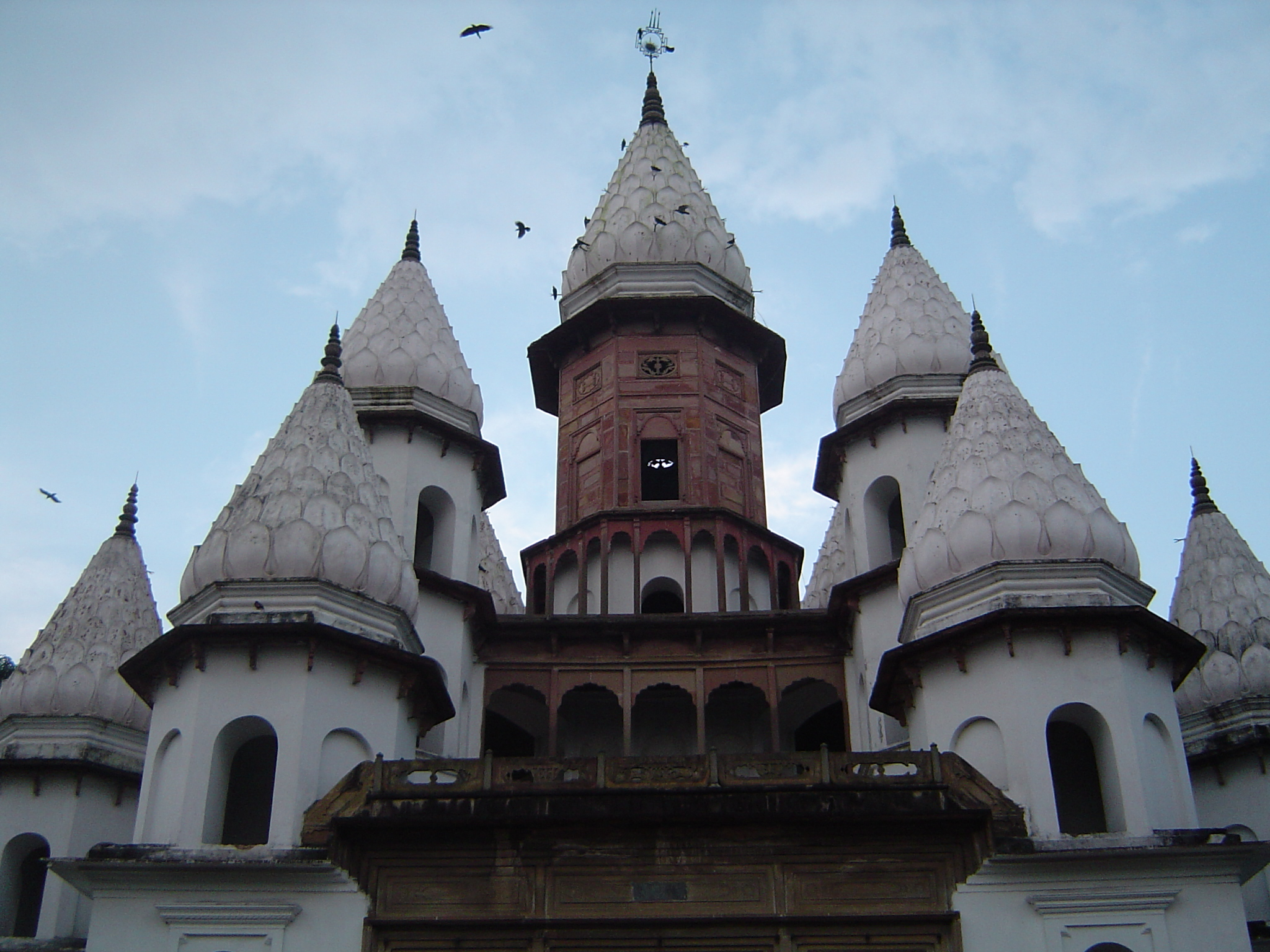
Hangseshwari Temple

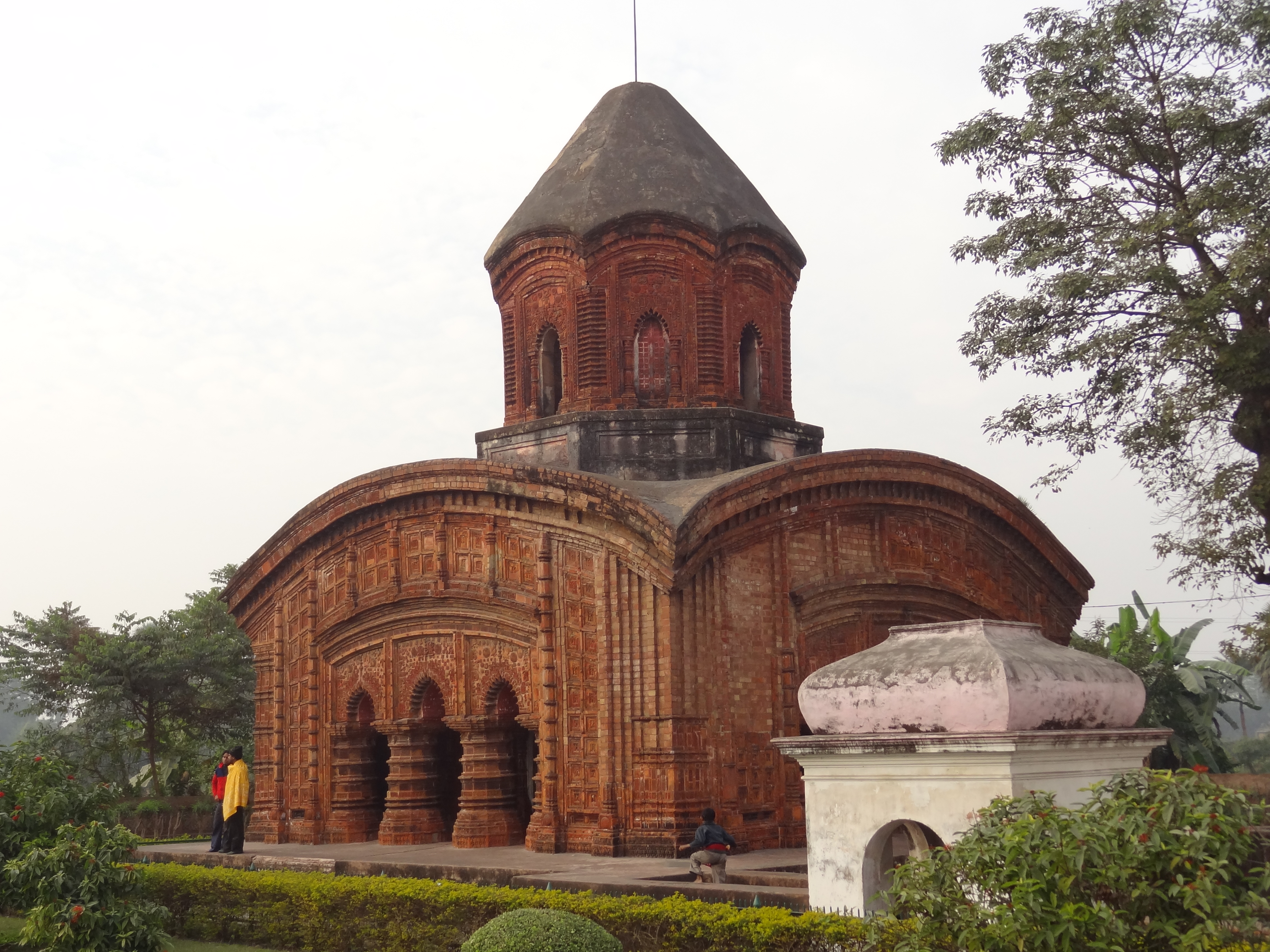
Ananta Basudeba Temple

Bansberia was one of the main city of ancient Saptagram.

Zafar Khan Ghazi Mosque and Dargah situated at Tribeni in Hooghly district, West Bengal, India, are considered to be among the earliest surviving Muslim monuments in Bengal. According to an inscription, the mosque is dated 698 AH (1298 AD). Tribeni (junction of three rivers viz, the Ganges, the Yamuna, and the Sarasvati - hence the name) was an ancient holy place of the Hindus until the Muslims conquered it during the early phase of their conquest of Bengal. The mosque itself has an oblong shape, with dimensions of 23.38 by 10.53 metres (76.7 by 34.5 ft) externally.

It is the earliest surviving example of the brick-and-stone style brought over by the Muslims. The stones used in the mosque were originally materials from temples, as evidenced by figures of Hindu deities carved on some pieces. The original structure has been rebuilt multiple times.

== Geography ==
Cities and towns in the Chinsurah subdivision (except Polba Dadpur and Dhaniakhali CD Blocks) in Hooghly district
M: municipal city/ town, CT: census town, R: rural/ urban centre,
Owing to space constraints in the small map, the actual locations in a larger map may vary slightly

=== Location ===
Bansberia is located at 22.97°N 88.40°E.

The area is composed of flat alluvial plains that forms part of the Gangetic Delta. The high west bank of the tidal Hooghly River is highly industrialised.

Hansghara, Kola, Alikhoja, Amodghata, Shankhanagar and Chak Bansberia form a cluster of census towns on the eastern side of Bansberia and includes Mogra and Bara Khejuria (outgrowth).

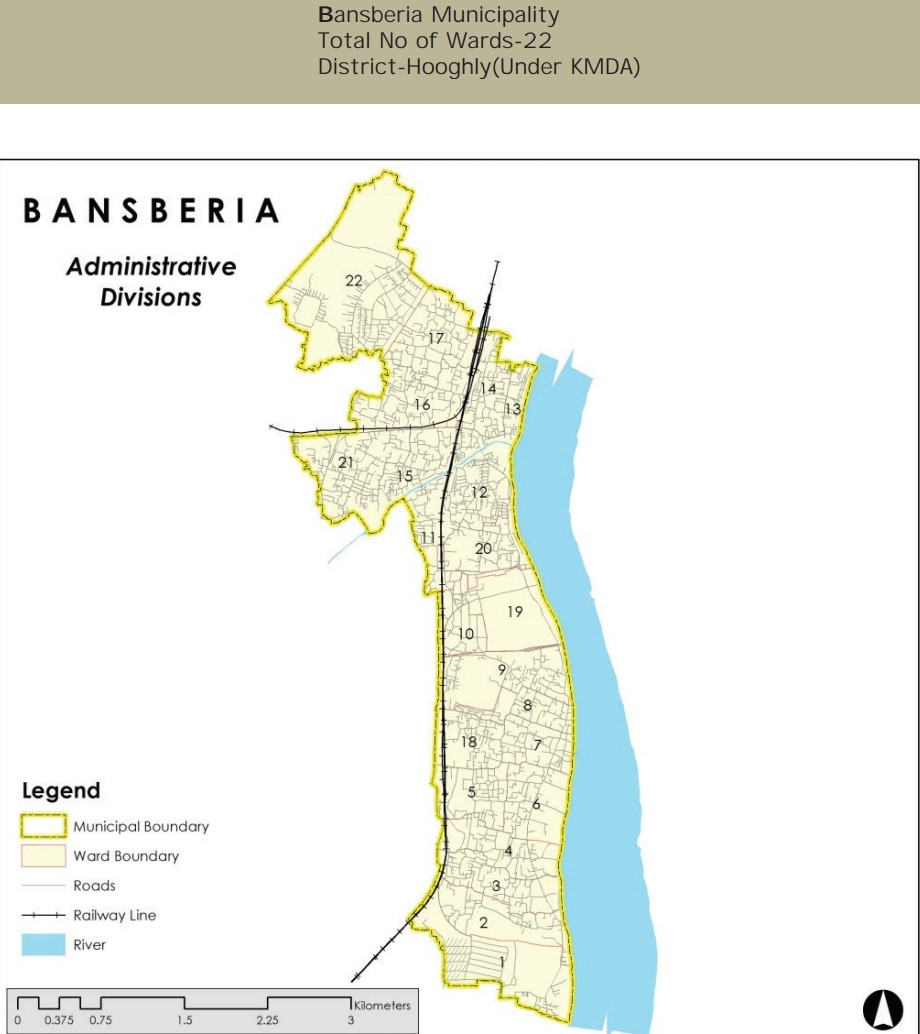
Bansberia Municipality Area Map.Click on the map to view a larger map.

=== Urbanisation ===
There are 13 statutory towns and 64 census towns in Hooghly district. The right bank of the Hooghly River has been industrialised over a long period. With foreigners dominating the area's industry, trade and commerce for over two centuries, it is amongst the leading industrialised districts in the state. At the same time the land is fertile and agricultural production is significant.

In Chinsurah subdivision 68.63% of the population is rural and the urban population is 31.37%. It has 2 statutory and 23 census towns. In Chinsurah Mogra CD Block 64.87% of the population is urban and 35.13% is rural. Amongst the four remaining CD Blocks in the subdivision two were overwhelmingly rural and two were wholly rural.

The map alongside shows a portion of Chinsurah subdivision. All places marked in the map are linked in the larger full screen map.

== Demographics ==
Historical population
Year	Pop.	±%
1901	6,473	—
1911	6,108	−5.6%
1921	6,382	+4.5%
1931	14,221	+122.8%
1941	23,716	+66.8%
1951	30,622	+29.1%
1961	45,463	+48.5%
1971	61,748	+35.8%
1981	88,581	+43.5%
1991	96,500	+8.9%
2001	107,081	+11.0%
2011	103,920	−3.0%
Source: Government of India

As per 2011 Census of India Bansberia had a total population of 103,799 of which 53,760 (52%) were males and 50,160 (48%) were females. Population below 6 years was 9,502. The total number of literates in Bansberia was 80,301 (85.05% of the population over 6 years).

=== Languages ===
Languages spoken in Bansberia city (2011)
1. Bengali (68.6%)
2. Hindi (20.1%)
3. Urdu (8.34%)
4. Bhojpuri (0.55%)
5. Odia (0.35%)
6. Others (1.97%)

The following Municipalities and Census Towns in Hooghly district were part of Kolkata Urban Agglomeration in 2011 census: Bansberia (M), Hugli-Chinsurah (M), Bara Khejuria (Out Growth), Shankhanagar (CT), Amodghata (CT), Chak Bansberia (CT), Naldanga (CT), Kodalia (CT), Kulihanda (CT), Simla (CT), Dharmapur (CT), Bhadreswar (M), Champdani (M), Chandannagar (M Corp.), Baidyabati (M), Serampore (M), Rishra (M), Rishra (CT), Bamunari (CT), Dakshin Rajyadharpur (CT), Nabagram Colony (CT), Konnagar (M), Uttarpara Kotrung (M), Raghunathpur (PS-Dankuni) (CT), Kanaipur (CT) and Keota (CT).

As of 2001 India census, Bansberia had a population of 104,453. Males constitute 53% of the population and females 47%. Bansberia has an average literacy rate of 71%, higher than the national average of 59.5%; with 58% of the literates being males and 42% of being females. 10% of the population is under 6 years of age.

== Transport ==
Bans Beria railway station is the main railway connection of the town. This station is well connected Howrah and Bandel. This is the greeny and clean railway station of West Bengal. Howrah - Katwa local, Bandel - Katwa local, Sealdah - Katwa local(a pair train in a day), Sealdah - Jangipur road passenger(except Sunday), Howrah - Azimganj express, Howrah - Katihar express stop Bansberia every day. Three platform are situated in Bansberia station. 4,000 (approx) people used this station for daily.

State Highway 6/ STKK Road passes through Bansberia. Private Bus Route no. 39 (Chunchura Court-Jirat) runs through here. Other modes of transport are: Tribeni-Chinsurah Auto-rickshaw route, Tribeni-Bandel railway station Tata Magic Van route, Dunlop Ferry Ghat-Kuntighat railway station Auto-rickshaw route, Tribeni railway station-Hooghly railway station Auto-rickshaw route etc. Besides, battery operated TOTO (E-rickshaw) also runs in Bansberia.

Bansberia is connected to Kalyani with Ishwar Gupta Setu along Kalyani Expressway across Bhagirathi-Hooghly River.

== See also ==
- Bansberia (Vidhan Sabha constituency)
