= Saptagram =

Village in Hooghly district, West Bengal

- সপ্তগ্রাম
- Satgaon
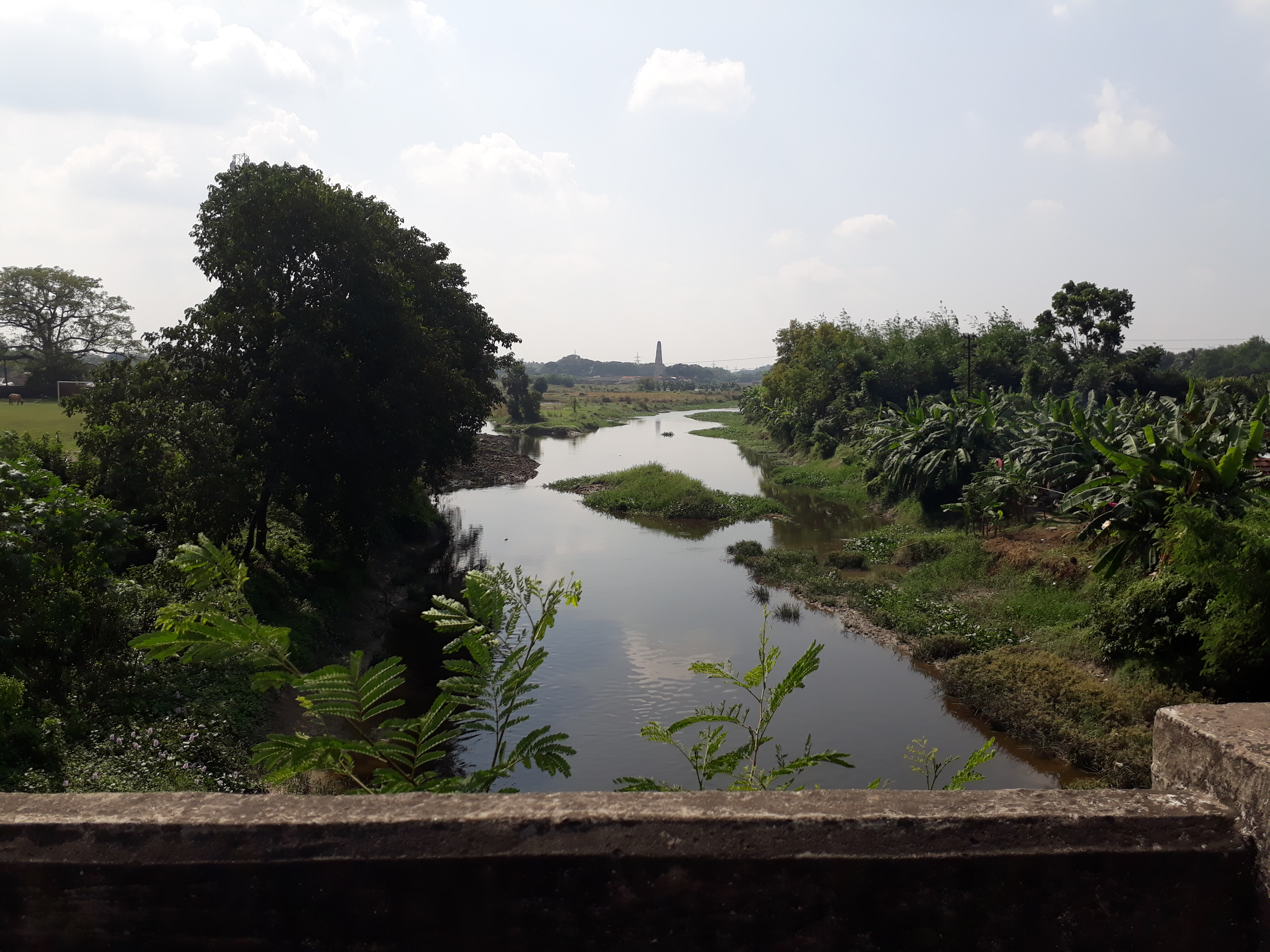
- Saraswati River at Saptagram

- Location of Gauḍa in West Bengal, India Location of Gauḍa in India
- 22.9667°N 88.3833°E
- Type: Port, settlement
- Location: Hooghly district, West Bengal, India

History
- Built: Prior to 9th century
- Abandoned: Started declining 17th to 18th century

Saptagram (colloquially called Satgaon) was an ancient major port, the chief city and sometimes capital of southern Bengal, in ancient and medieval times of Bengal, the location presently being Saptagram in the Hooghly district in the Indian state of West Bengal. It is about 4 km from Bandel, a major rail junction. By the early twentieth century, the place had dwindled to a group of insignificant huts. The port had to be abandoned because of the silting up and consequent drying of the Saraswati River.

== Etymology ==
The word Saptagram means seven villages. These are identified as Bansberia, Kristapur, Basudebpur, Nityanandapur, Sibpur, Sambachora and Baladghati.

Bandel-Saptagram Area as it is today
R: rural/ urban centre, F: facility, H: historical site
Owing to space constraints in the small map, the actual locations in a larger map may vary slightly

== History ==
According to Binoy Ghosh, Tamralipta, the ancient port, started declining from the 8th century, owing to river silting, and Saptagram possibly started gaining in importance as a port from the 9th to 10th century. The Saptagram port, along with its business centre, had become important in the pre-Muslim era, during the rule of the Palas and Senas. In the Muslim era, Saptagram was an important administrative centre right from the beginning, and the period 14th to 16th century was considered the golden age of Saptagram. In 1565, Maharaja Rudranarayan of Bhurshut annexed it from the Pathans. In 1592, Saptagram was recaptured by the Pathans. In the 17th century, Bandel-Hooghly-Chinsurah started gaining in importance. From the 18th century, Kolkata started emerging as the main business and cultural centre of Bengal.

== See also ==
- Saptagram (modern)
- Saptagram (Vidhan Sabha constituency)
