= Adisaptagram railway station =

Railway station in West Bengal, India

Adisaptagram
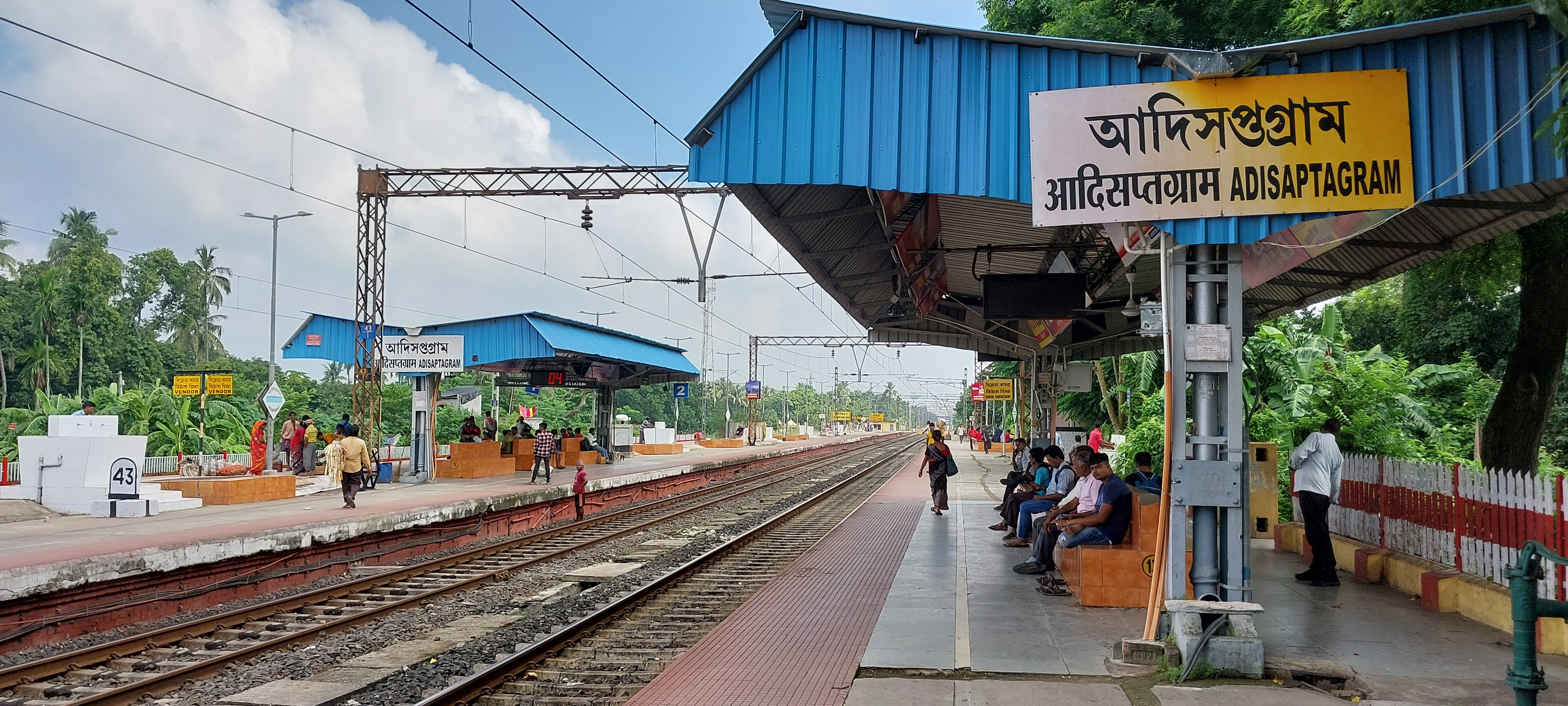

General information
- Location: S.T. Road, Adisaptagram, Trishbigha, Hooghly district, West Bengal; India
- Coordinates: 22°57′17″N 88°22′45″E
- Elevation: 16 metres (52 ft)
- System: Kolkata Suburban Railway
- Owner: Indian Railways
- Operator: Eastern Railway
- Line: Howrah–Bardhaman main line
- Platforms: 3
- Tracks: 3

Construction
- Structure type: At grade
- Parking: No

Other information
- Status: Functioning
- Station code: ADST
- Zone(s): Eastern Railway
- Division(s): Howrah

History
- Opened: 1855
- Electrified: 1958
- Former names: East Indian Railway Company

Services
Preceding station	Kolkata Suburban Railway	Following station
Bandel Junction towards Howrah Junction	Eastern Line Howrah–Bardhaman main line	Mogra towards Barddhaman Junction
Route map
Location
- Location within West Bengal Location within India

Adisaptagram railway station is a Kolkata Suburban Railway station on the Howrah–Bardhaman main line operated by Eastern Railway zone of Indian Railway. It is situated beside S.T. Road, Adisaptagram, Trishbigha in Hooghly district in the Indian state of West Bengal. It serves Saptagram and surrounding areas such as Debanandapur, Kestopur etc. Number of EMU stop at Adisaptagram railway station.

== Brief history ==
The East Indian Railway Company was formed on 1 June 1845, The first passenger train in the eastern section was operated up to Hooghly, on 15 August 1854. On 1 February 1855 the first train ran from Howrah to Raniganj through Howrah–Bardhaman main line. Bandel to Bardhaman route was opened for traffic on 1 January 1885. Electrification of the Howrah–Bardhaman main line was initiated up to Bandel in 1957, with the 3000 v DC system, and the entire Howrah–Bardhaman route including Adisaptagram railway station completed with AC system, along with conversion of earlier DC portions to 25 kV AC, in 1958.
