= 2023 West Bengal local elections =

Local village body elections in India

2023 West Bengal Panchayat elections
- 8 July 2023

63,229 Gram Panchayat 9,730 Panchayat Samiti 928 Zilla Parishad
- Turnout: 80.71% (▼1.46 pp)

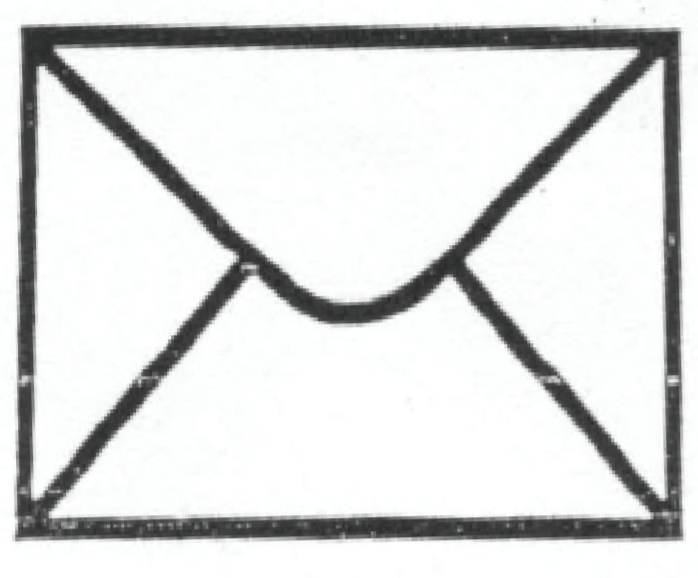
	Majority party	Minority party	Third party
Leader	Mamata Banerjee	Sukanta Majumdar	Mohammed Salim
Party	AITC	BJP	CPI(M)
Leader since	5 June 2021	20 September 2021	16 March 2022
Popular vote	51%	23%	14%
Swing	▼21%	▲10%	▲8%
Gram Panchayat	44,105	9,990	3,242
Panchayat Samiti	7,855	1,074	196
Zilla Parishad	879	31	2
	Fourth party	Fifth party
Leader	Adhir Ranjan Chowdhury	Nawsad Siddique
Party	INC	AISF
Leader since	20 September 2021	21 January 2021
Popular vote	7%	2%
Swing	▲2%	New
Gram Panchayat	2,680	543
Panchayat Samiti	293	0
Zilla Parishad	14	1

Panchayat elections were held in the Indian state of West Bengal in July 2023. It was held by the West Bengal State Election Commission. The results were announced on 11 July 2023.

== Schedule ==
The election schedule was announced by the State Election Commission of West Bengal on 8 June 2023.

Poll Event	Schedule
Notification Date	9 June 2023
Last Date for filing nomination	15 June 2023
Last Date for Withdrawal of nomination	20 June 2023
Date of Poll	8 July 2023
Date of Counting of Votes	11 July 2023

== Parties and alliances ==
Party		Symbol	Alliance
Trinamool Congress	AITC		
Bharatiya Janata Party	BJP		
Communist Party of India (Marxist)	CPI(M)		Sanjukta Morcha
Indian National Congress	INC		Sanjukta Morcha
All India Forward Bloc	AIFB		Sanjukta Morcha
Revolutionary Socialist Party	RSP		Sanjukta Morcha
Communist Party of India	CPI		Sanjukta Morcha
All India Secular Front	ISF		Sanjukta Morcha
Nationalist Congress Party	NCP		Sanjukta Morcha
Communist Party of India (Marxist–Leninist) Liberation	CPI(ML)L		
Socialist Unity Centre of India (Communist)	SUCI(C)		

== Turnout ==
80.71 percent of the total voters exercised their franchise in the three-tier panchayat elections, according to the West Bengal State Election Commission. The re-poll in 600 booths where voting had to be suspended due to violence is scheduled to be held on 10 July 2023.

== Violence ==
Between 8 June and 16 July 2023 a total of 55 people died due to panchayat poll violence in the state.

On 8 July 2023, 12 persons died due to election-day violence. On 9 July 2023, six more deaths were reported, increasing the death toll to 18 on the election day. The dead included 10 Trinamool Congress supporters, four from the Indian National Congress, two from the Bharatiya Janata Party and two from the Communist Party of India (Marxist).

On 11 July 2023, result day late night in Bhangar, South 24 parganas there were gunshots and huge bombings killing 3.

"Murder of democracy in West Bengal under the TMC govt. Over 60 dead & 100s injured in the local body elections. Strongly condemn. Strengthen popular resistance to save democracy in Bengal & in India," said Sitaram Yechury, National Secretary, Communist Party of India (Marxist), condemning the alleged rigging in elections by the ruling party.

== Results ==
=== Partywise ===
Vote share by Party
1. AITC (51.0%)
2. BJP (23.0%)
3. LF (14.0%)
4. INC (7.00%)
5. AISF (1.00%)
6. Others (4.00%)
Vote share by Alliance
1. AITC (51.0%)
2. BJP (23.0%)
3. Sanjukta Morcha (Note: inc. Left Front, INC, AISF, SUCI(C), NCP and CPI (ML)) (22.9%)
4. Others (4.00%)

Political parties	Popular votes	% of votes	Gram Panchayat	Panchayat Samiti	Zilla Parishad
Trinamool Congress	20,942,380	51.14%	35,606	6,560	877
Bharatiya Janata Party	9,467,540	22.92%	9,990	1,044	31
Sanjukta Morcha	9,565,359	23.02%	6,822	459	17
Others	1,081,673	2.84%	2,972	301	1

=== Zilla Parishad wise ===
Corporation Election Data Published by State Election Commission of West Bengal

No.	Zilla Parishad	Total Seats						
No.	Zilla Parishad	Total Seats	AITC	BJP	Sanjukta Morcha			Others
No.	Zilla Parishad	Total Seats	AITC	BJP	CPI(M)	INC	AISF	Others
1	Cooch Behar	34	32	2	0			0
2	Alipurduar	18	18	0	0			0
3	Jalpaiguri	24	24	0	0			0
4	Uttar Dinajpur	26	23	0	0	3	0	0
5	Dakshin Dinajpur	21	21	0	0			0
6	Malda	43	34	4	0	5	0	0
7	Murshidabad	78	71	0	2	5	0	0
8	Nadia	52	46	6	0			0
9	North 24 Parganas	66	66	0	0			0
10	South 24 Parganas	85	84	0	0	0	1	0
11	Howrah	42	42	0	0			0
12	Hooghly	53	51	2	0			0
13	Purba Bardhaman	66	66	0	0			0
14	Paschim Bardhaman	18	18	0	0			0
15	Birbhum	52	51	0	0	1	0	0
16	Purba Medinipur	70	56	14	0			0
17	Paschim Medinipur	60	60	0	0			0
18	Jhargram	19	19	0	0			0
19	Purulia	45	42	2	0			1
20	Bankura	56	55	1	0			0
Total		928	879	31	2	14	1	1

== Analysis ==
The Trinamool Congress won a landslide victory in the panchayat election, winning 100 per cent of Zilla Parishads, 92 per cent Panchayat Samitis and 80 per cent Gram Panchayats.

The Bharatiya Janata Party secured a second position in these polls and performed well in North Bengal.

The Sanjukta Morcha alliance came third in these local bodies elections. The AISF especially performed well in the areas where it contested, winning almost 50% of the seats contested. The Left Front and INC also performed well in the Muslim-dominated Malda division. Most notably Left Front pushed Bharatiya Janata Party to third spot in the Burdwan division after a long time since 2016.
