= Mogra railway station =

Railway station in West Bengal, India

Magra
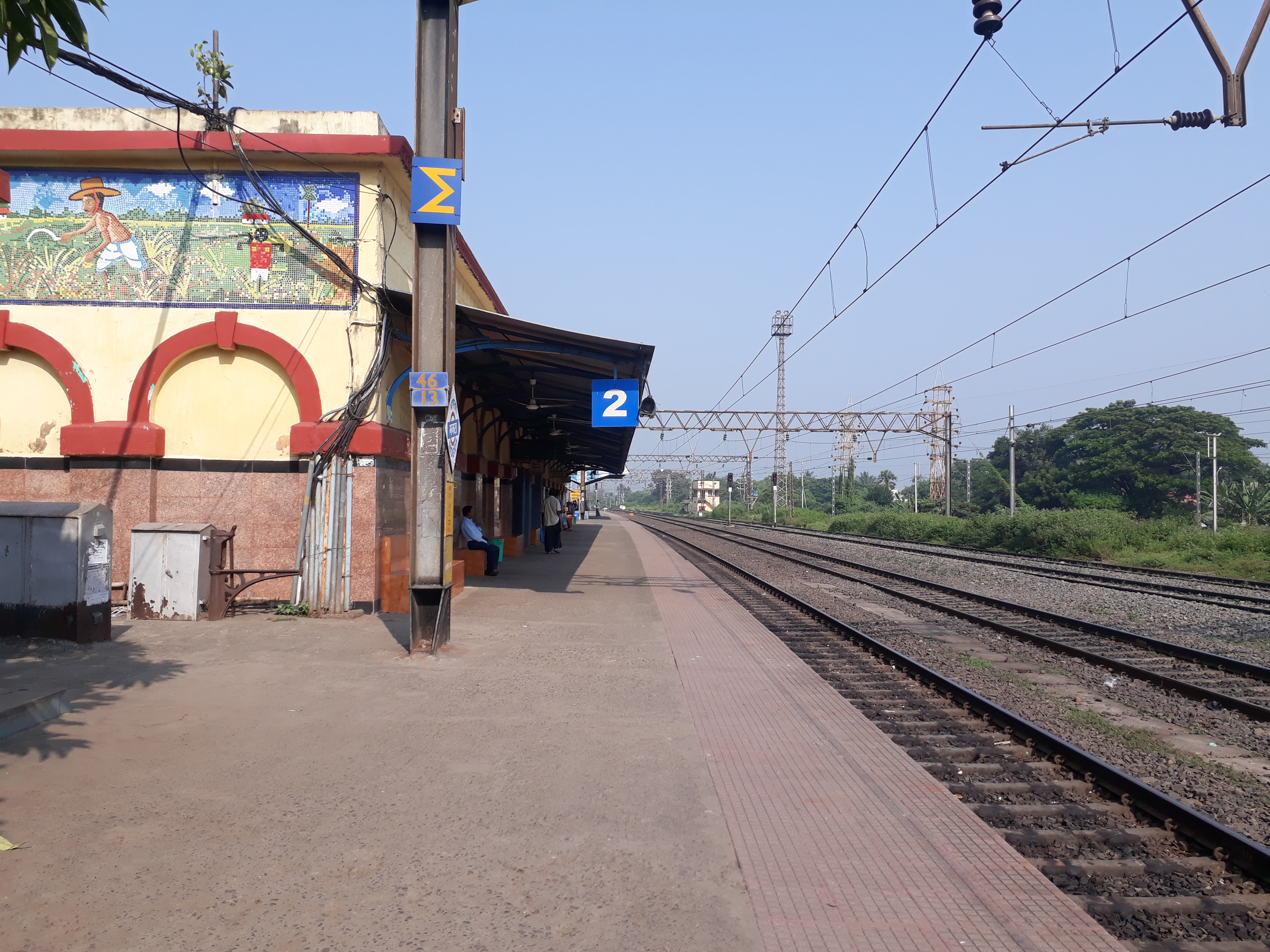
- Mogra railway station

General information
- Location: Polba Road, Alikhoja, Mogra, Hooghly district, West Bengal; India
- Coordinates: 22°59′03″N 88°22′05″E
- System: Kolkata Suburban Railway station
- Owner: Indian Railways
- Operator: Eastern Railway
- Line: Howrah–Bardhaman main line
- Platforms: 5
- Tracks: 3 Main/8 Loop

Construction
- Structure type: Standard (on-ground station)
- Parking: Yes

Other information
- Status: Functioning
- Station code: MUG
- Division(s): Howrah

History
- Opened: 1855
- Electrified: 1958
- Former names: East Indian Railway Company

Services
Preceding station	Kolkata Suburban Railway	Following station
Adisaptagram towards Howrah Junction	Eastern Line Howrah–Bardhaman main line	Talandu towards Barddhaman Junction
Route map
Location
- Location within West Bengal Location within India

Magra railway station is a Kolkata Suburban Railway station on the Howrah–Bardhaman main line operated by Eastern Railway zone of Indian Railways. It is situated beside Polba Road, Alikhoja, Mogra in Hooghly district in the Indian state of West Bengal. All EMU and passenger trains stops at Mogra railway station. The construction work of third line between Bandel and Bardhaman is completed for which a new platform(1) is created. Mogra-Katwa line connecting Magra on Howrah–Bardhaman Main line with Tribeni on Bandel–Katwa line is also there. As of now it is only use for goods train transport. Another line from Tarakeswar to Mogra via Dhaniakhali is also in development. Magra will be transferred to Magra Junction soon after the development of the Magra-Tarakeswar line via Dhaniakhali. Lands for the new Magra-Tarakeswar line are brought by the government and it is also in development.

== History ==
The East Indian Railway Company was formed on 1 June 1845, The first passenger train in the eastern section was operated up to Hooghly, on 15 August 1854. On 1 February 1855 the first train ran from Howrah to Raniganj through Howrah–Bardhaman main line. Bandel to Bardhaman route was opened for traffic on 1 January 1885. Electrification of the Howrah–Bardhaman main line was initiated up to Bandel in 1957, with the 3000V DC system, and the entire Howrah–Bardhaman route including Mogra railway station completed with AC system, along with conversion of earlier DC portions to 25 kV AC, in 1958.
