= Tribeni, Hooghly =

Tribeni
- Neighbourhood
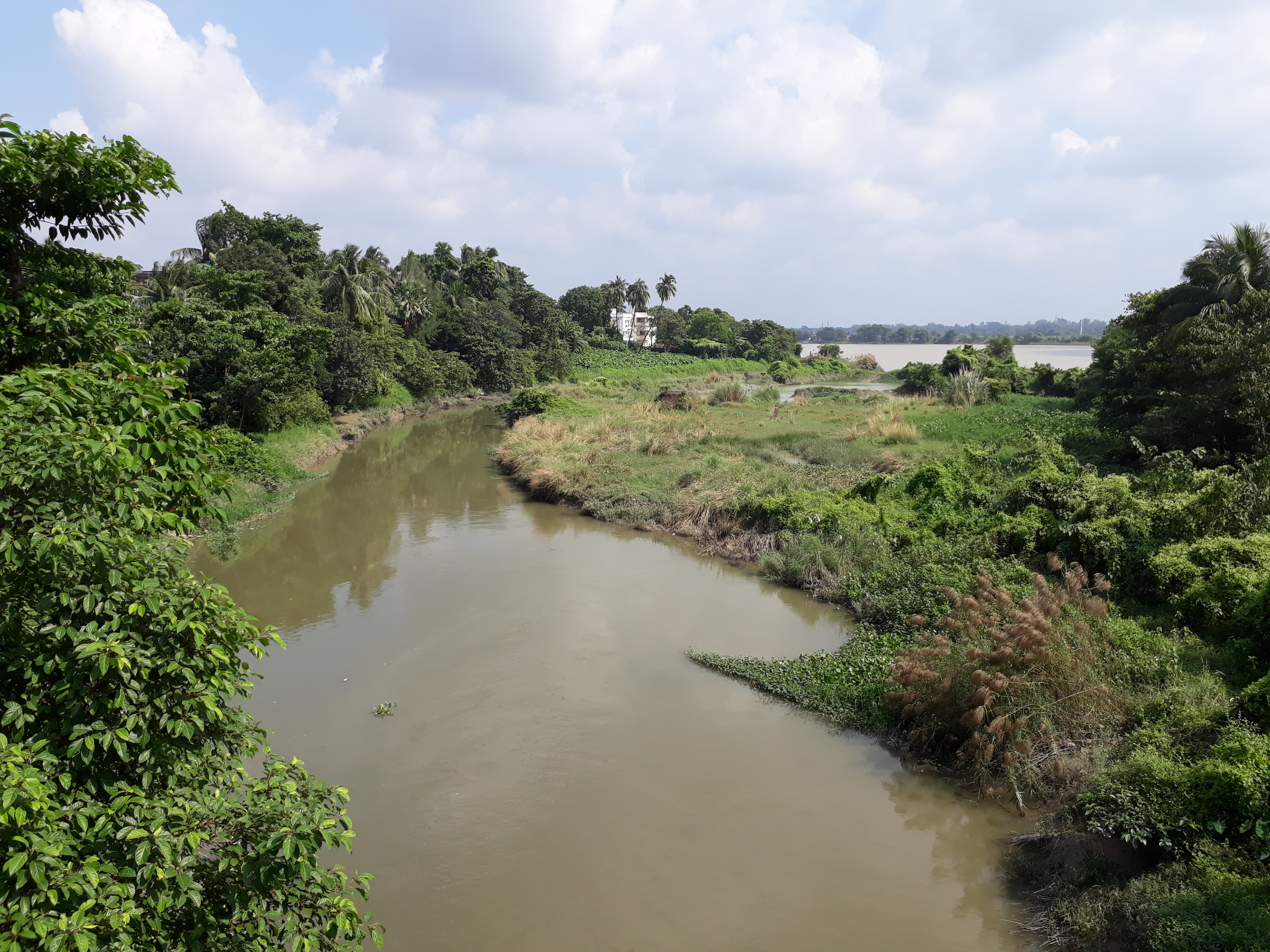
- Sarswati river at Tribeni

- Location in West Bengal, India Tribeni (India)
- Coordinates: 22.99°N 88.40°E
- Country: India
- State: West Bengal
- Division: Burdwan
- District: Hooghly

Government
  - Type: Municipality
  - Body: Bansberia Municipality

Area
  - Total: 5.05 km^{2} (1.95 sq mi)
- Elevation: 4 m (13 ft)

Population (2020)
  - Total: 112,114
  - Density: 22,200/km^{2} (57,500/sq mi)

Languages
  - Official: Bengali, English
- Time zone: UTC+5:30 (IST)
- PIN: 712503
- Telephone code: +91 33
- ISO 3166 code: IN-WB
- Vehicle registration: WB
- Lok Sabha constituency: Hooghly
- Vidhan Sabha constituency: Saptagram

Tribeni is a neighbourhood under Bansberia Municipality of Hooghly district in the Indian state of West Bengal. It is a part of the area covered by Kolkata Metropolitan Development Authority (KMDA).

== Geography ==
Bandel-Saptagram Area as it is today
R: rural/ urban centre, F: facility, H: historical site
Owing to space constraints in the small map, the actual locations in a larger map may vary slightly

=== Location ===
Tribeni is located at 22.99°N 88.40°E.

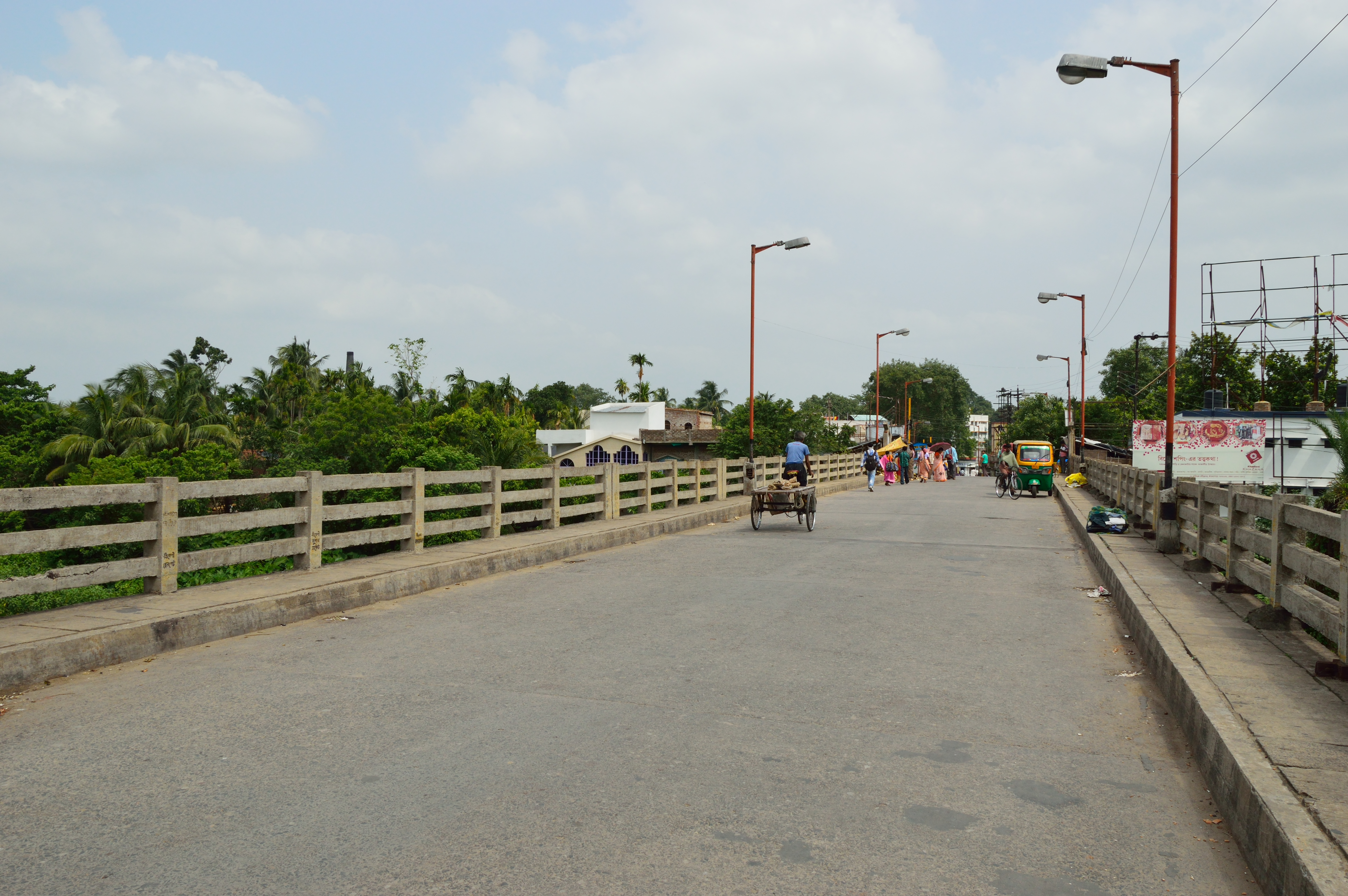
Netaji Subhash Bridge over River Saraswati, Tribeni

== History ==
Tribeni is believed to get its name from the divergence of three rivers — Ganga, Jamuna and Saraswati. The probable earlier names were "Muktaveni", which distinguished it from Prayagraj, known as Yuktaveni; it also featured in James Rennell's map of Bengal in 1781 where it was spelled as "Terbonee". The river Saraswati comes from the south of the famous Hindu cremate area, commonly known as ‘Shoshan ghat’, westwards into Saptagram. The Yamuna, commonly pronounced as Jamuna in Bengali, had earlier branched off from the Ganges towards south east, but the confluence has silted up with course of time. This leaves the river Ganges, variedly known as Hooghly or Bhagirathi to descend to the sea. The Ghat in Tribeni which lies beside the confluence was built by a king of Bhurisrestha, Rudranarayan Rai Mukhti and that left an influence of Odisha in Tribeni apparent from the temples near the ghat. The town is on the western banks of the Ganges with no plateau or hills in its close vicinity and hosts one of the earliest surviving monuments of Muslim in West Bengal, Zafar Khan Gazi's Mosque. The mosque bears an Arabic chronogram, 1298 though there remains evidence that suggests it was remodeled over time. The date is further corroborated by the fact that Tribeni along with nearby areas were occupied by Zafar Khan in 1267, after around 60 years from the conquest of Bengal. Its doorways have Hindu Vaishnavite sculptures inscribed along with Sanskrit scripts on its walls which can be associated to a temple from where the slabs were procured or as well could be a temple on which the mosque probably was built.

Tribeni had been of great importance during the Pala and Sena periods, and after the Muslim incursions, Saptagram became a major administrative center for the Sultans of Bengal. During the sixteenth century, Portuguese and French settlements in the Hooghly District were presumably looking to the possibility of trade across the Saraswati River at the port of Saptagram. Around 1536–37, the King of Bengal had given the Custom houses in Satgaon, today's Saptagram, along with Chittagong, the major port, to the Portuguese to set up trading centers, which ultimately extended their land occupation. During 1579–80, Antonio Tavares founded Ugolim (Hooghly) which outshone Satgaon, and had around five thousand Portuguese inhabitants. Their settlement was highly curtailed during the Mughal assault, where they appeared relatively ill-equipped for such an attack. For the same vulnerability of Mughal threats and the lack of available defense along with depleting trade prospects through Saraswati due to its drying up, Job Charnock, chief agent of East India Company in Hugli, along with his team decided to move further south to Sutanuti in 1690, where several local villages were populated by local merchants and a trading center was available, which later became part of Calcutta. Tribeni was also a host to the British army during World War II in Nissen huts which can still be seen near Shibpur. The town was however revived by many factories in the 20th century, e.g. jute mills, the Bandel Thermal Power Station, the paper factory for ITC and the tire and rayon factories nearby the town.

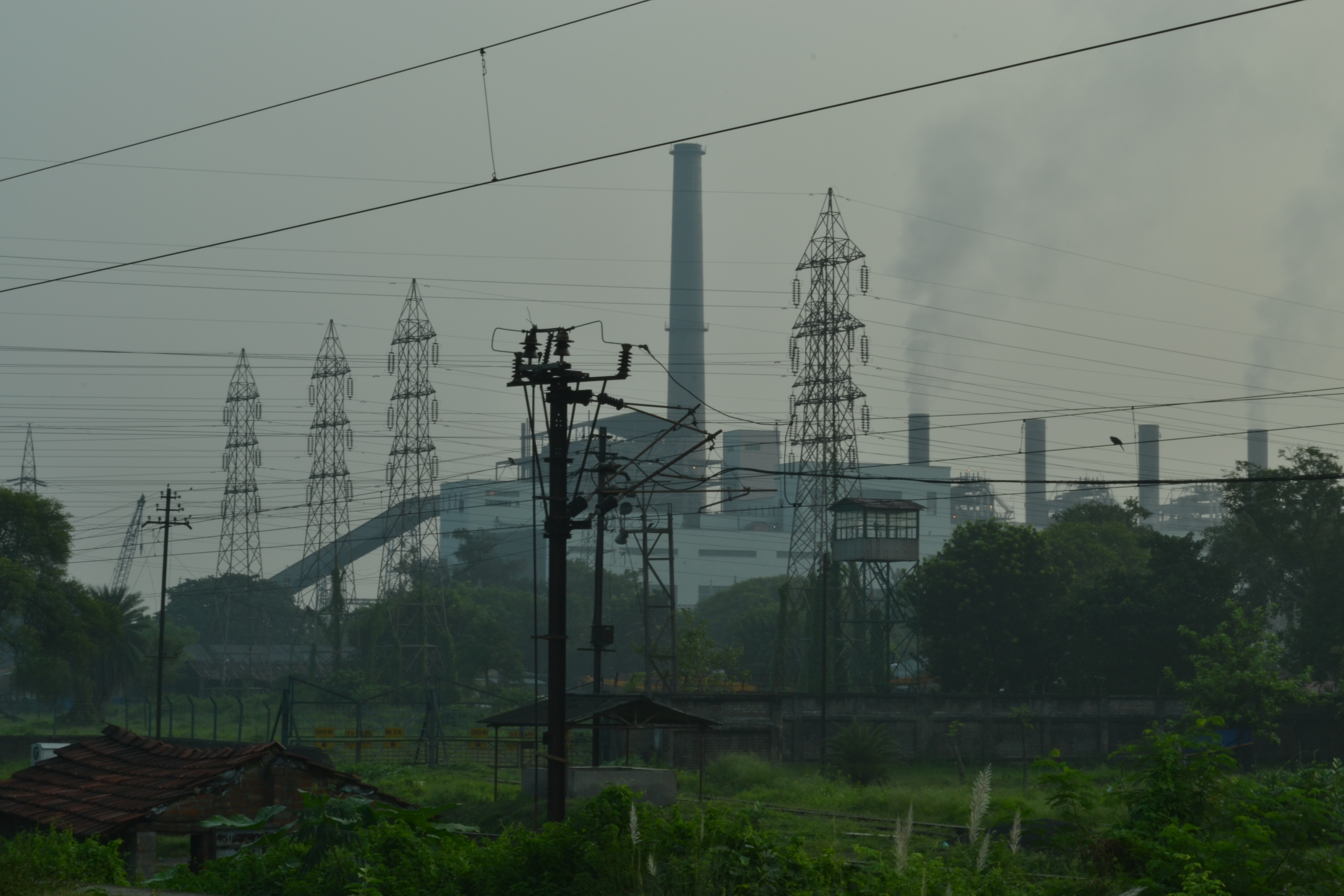
Bandel Thermal Power Station

The density of population, in the 21st century, is on a rise, and as such the communication has seen a growth, both in railways as well as in postal services among others; Internet and cell phone connectivity have entered Tribeni in the late 20th century, parallel to other towns in Hooghly.

== Transport & tourism ==
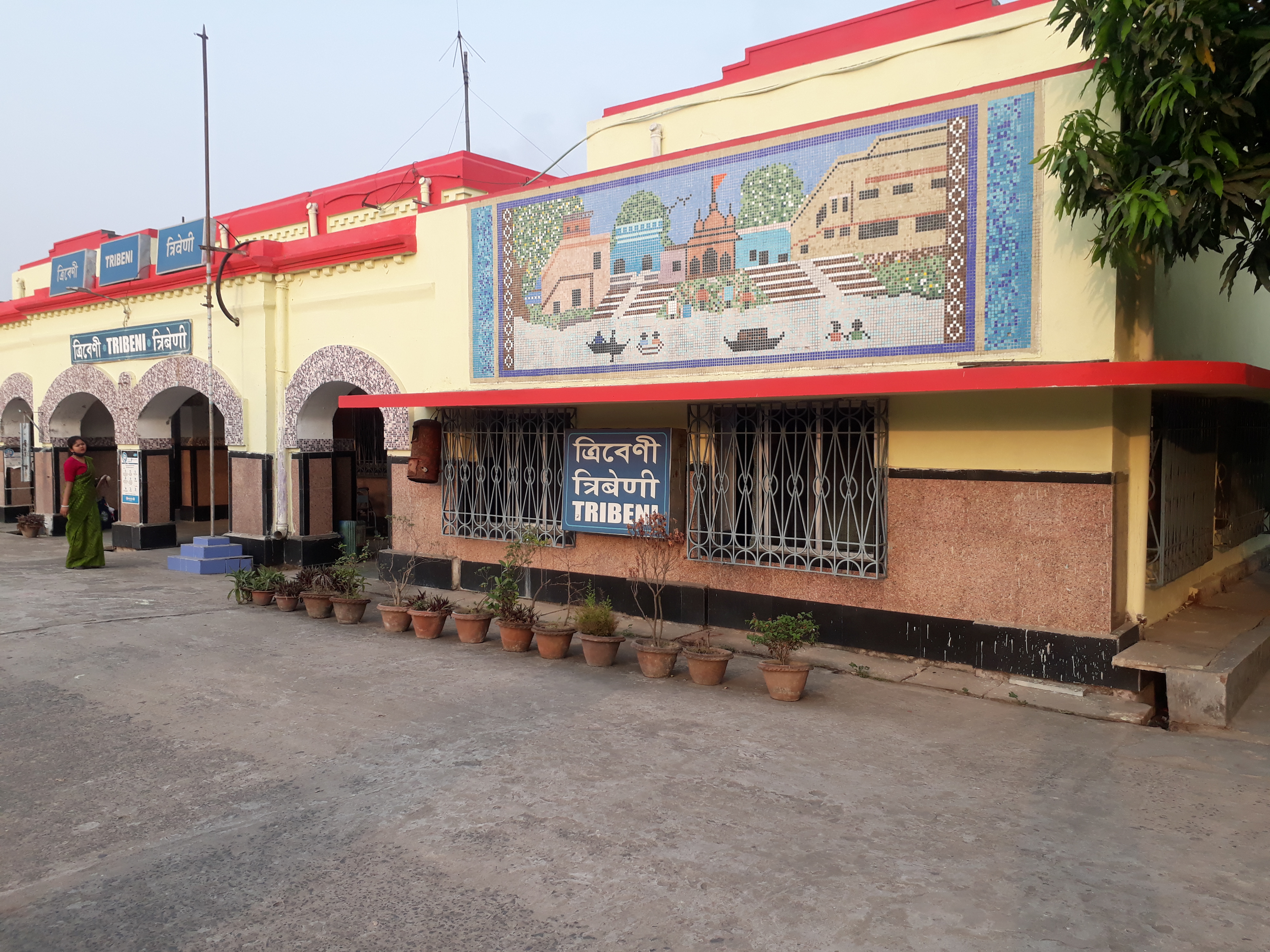
Tribeni railway station

Tribeni is 66 km away from Kolkata, capital of West Bengal, on road and 48 km from Howrah Station. Tribeni railway station and the nearest major railway station is Bandel Junction, 7 km on the Bandel-Katwa Railway Line, which can be used to board express trains towards north Bengal. The town is also benefitted by the Howrah-Bardhaman main line. Mogra railway station can be commuted from Tribeni with ease, whereas Kalyani railway station is situated on the other side of the Bhagirathi-Hooghly River.

State Highway 6/ STKK Road runs through the town and meets the Grand Trunk Road, one of the Asia's oldest and longest major road and also runs besides the town, near Adisaptagram. Buses for route numbered 39 between Chunchura Court & Jirat, the farthest that can be traveled between south and north in a single bus journey, runs through the State Highway.

National Waterway 1, stretching for 1620 km from Haldia to Allahabad, has an ambitious plan of cargo movement and be operative by 2021 through the Bhagirathi-Hooghly River adjacent to the town.

Jafar Khan Gazi's Mosque resembles a unique transformation from stone post and lintel temples belonging to Pala senas to brick dome and arch structures, quite common to Muslim rulers in West Bengal.

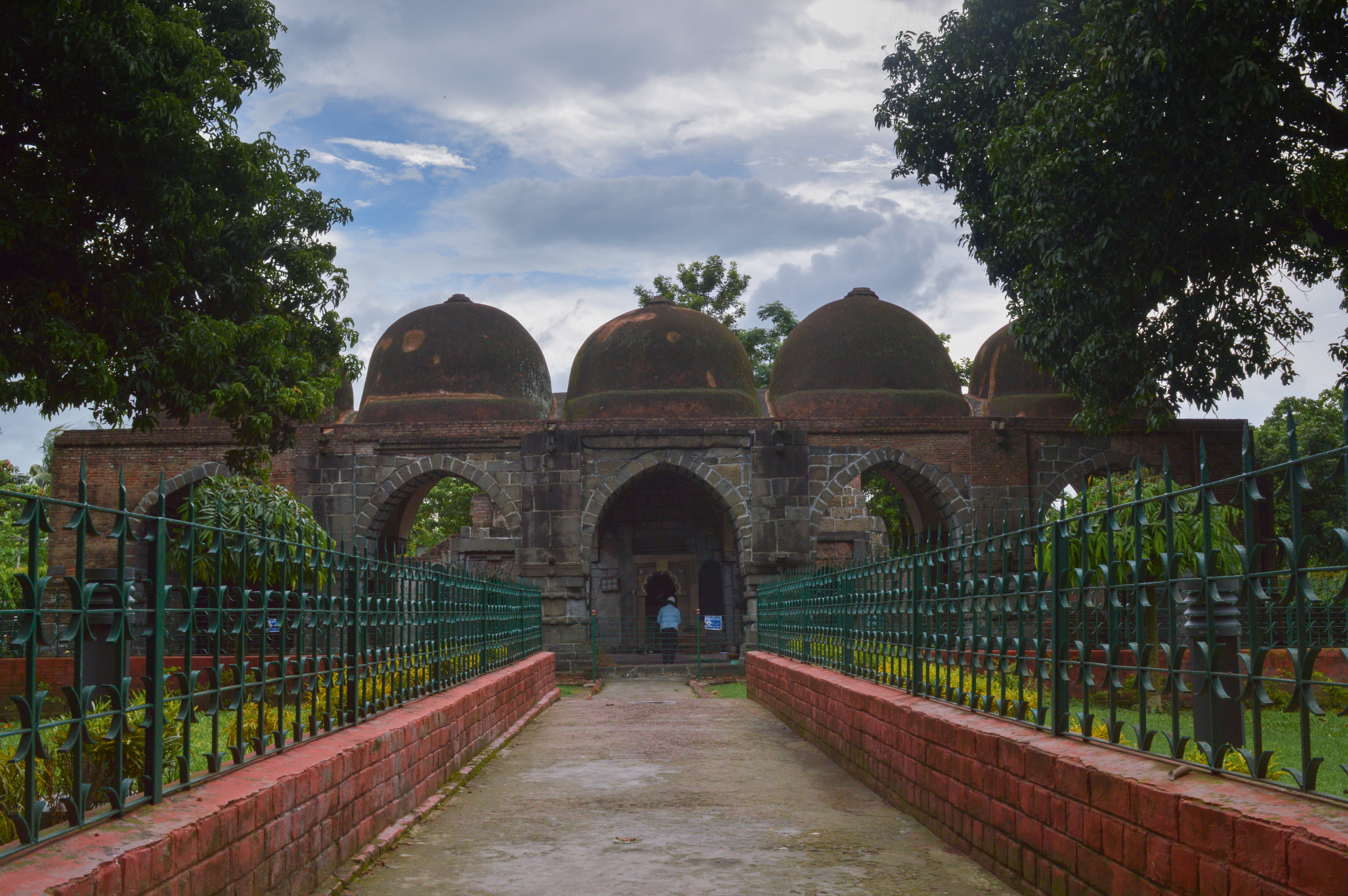
Zafar Khan Ghazi Mosque and Dargah in Tribeni, Hooghly

Hangseshwari Temple, in Bansberia, is 21 meters tall and has 13 towers, each shaped as a lotus flower. The architecture based on Kundalini and yoga concepts. Inner precincts of the minars follow the design of the human anatomy. Metallic idol of rising Sun God with his thousand bright rays has been inscribed on the top of the central minar. The deity has been designed and installed following the concept of Yoga and Pranayam. The Deity is blue in colour and made of wood derived from "Neem" tree.

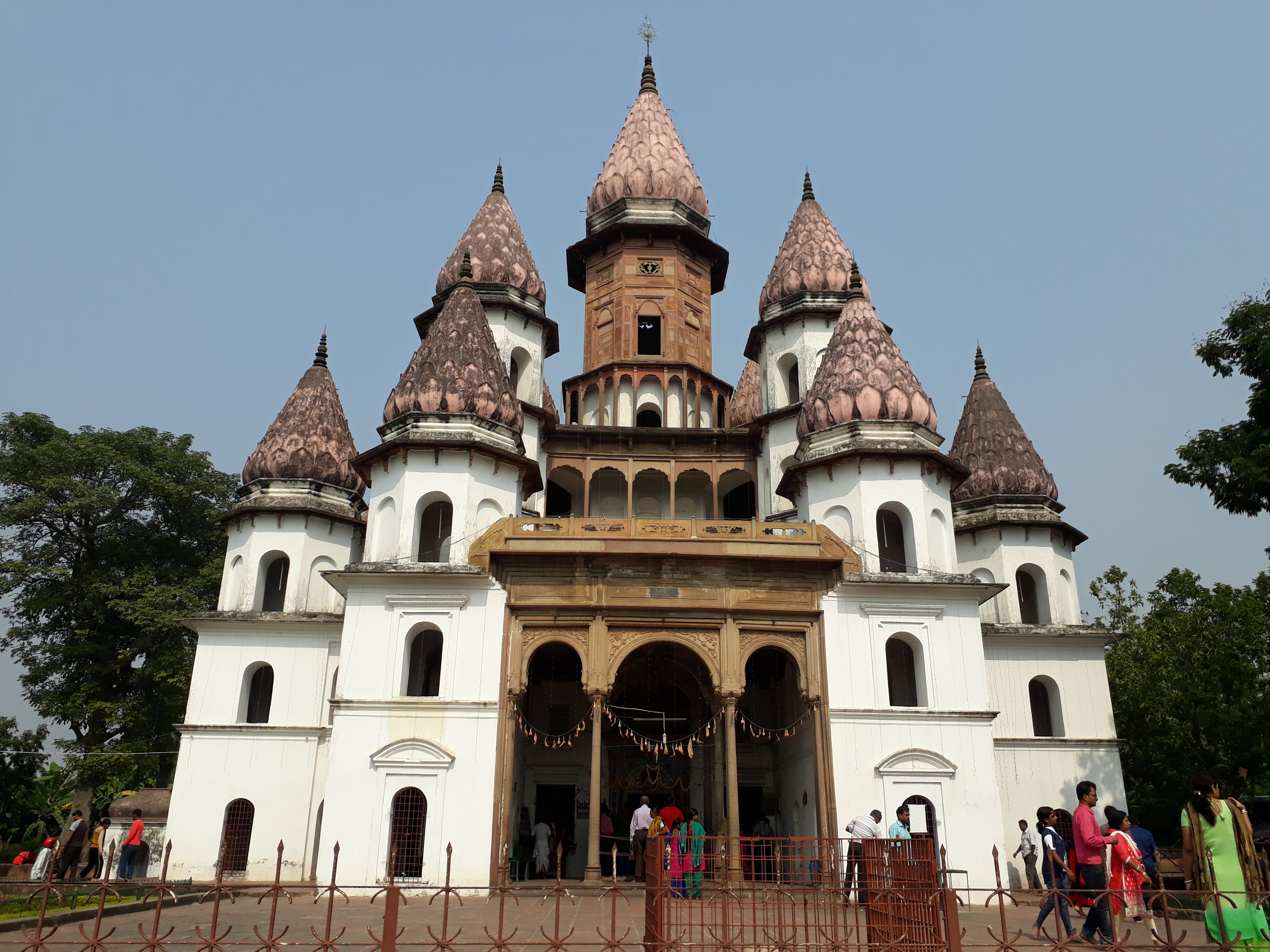
Hangseshwari Temple

The complex additionally includes Ananta Basudeba Temple, a terracotta temple with terracotta works on it.

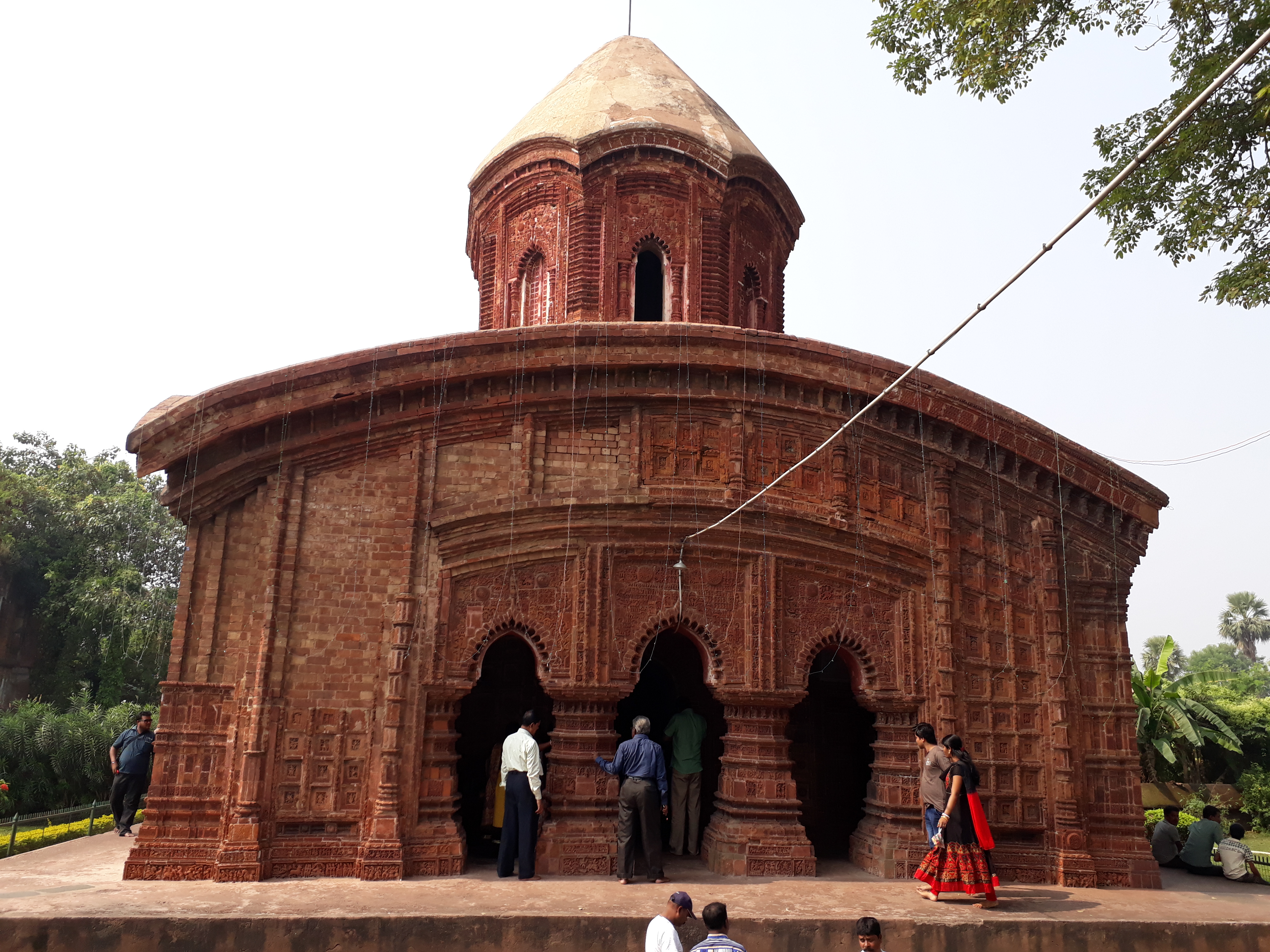
Ananta Basudeba Temple

Bandel Church, situated around 7 km from Tribeni, is the oldest church in West Bengal, initially constructed by 1599, was reconstructed post the Portuguese settlement were savaged and later awarded back by the Mughal Emperor. The statue ‘Our Lady of the Happy Voyage’ was saved from the attack and was miraculously found later and reinstated. The name of the place supposedly came from the Portuguese word ‘Mastro de Bandeira’ which meant flag post and later got transformed to Bandel, as the captain of a wrecked ship offered the main mast he promised to offer the first church he would find. The ship with its crew, is believed to arrive at its bank when the celebrations for the inauguration of the church were on its way.

Among other interesting facts in and around Tribeni are:

- There was a large European settlement south of Tribeni, which included Portuguese, Dutch, French & Danish settlements even before British East India Company made Calcutta their stronghold.
- "Barowari puja" or public organisation of a religious festival, which was a sharp contrast to the way big festivals were conducted by rich families, commenced in Guptipara, north of Tribeni.
- Jubilee Bridge (now replaced by Sampreeti Bridge) connecting Bandel and Naihati is one of the oldest rail bridges in the country, was constructed even before the Howrah Bridge.
- Kalyani, situated on the eastern side of the Ganges, was a site for American Airbase during WWII and was later developed as a planned town post independence to accommodate growing housing demand in Calcutta.

== Scholars ==
Pundit Jagannath Tarka Panchanan, the legendary scholar on all branches of the Dharmasastras was born in Tribeni on 23 September 1695, had assisted Sir William Jones in his endeavor to compile Vivadabhangarnava –that literally means ‘a break wave on the ocean of disputes' and reconcile the schools of Hindu jurisprudence, to assist judges to familiarize with the Indian culture as a consequence of a parliamentary mandate to perform judicial duties. The text was first published under the title – A Digest of Hindu Law, in 1801, which tried to legitimize the transformation of the prescriptive guidelines enshrined in the Sastras into legal rules to be directly administered through court by using terminologies like 'Digest'. He supposedly introduced Durga Puja in Tribeni, and the Baikunthupur Durga puja continues its traditions even today.

Ramgopal Ghosh, born in Bagati in the year 1815, was a member of the first council of Bethune Society, a literary association established in Calcutta in December 1851 for the consideration and discussion of questions connected with literature and science with the object of promoting the spirit of inquiry and knowledge among the Bengalis on the one hand, and establishing racial harmony between the Europeans and the natives on the other.

Sarat Chandra Chattopadhyay was a popular Bengali novelist and short story writer of the early 20th century, was born in Debanandapur, near Bandel.

Rabindranath Mukherjee, born in Tribeni in 1953, is a former chemistry professor and a former director of the Indian Institute of Science Education and Research, Kolkata.

== See also ==
- Triveni Sangam
