= Bandel Thermal Power Station =

Thermal power plant in India

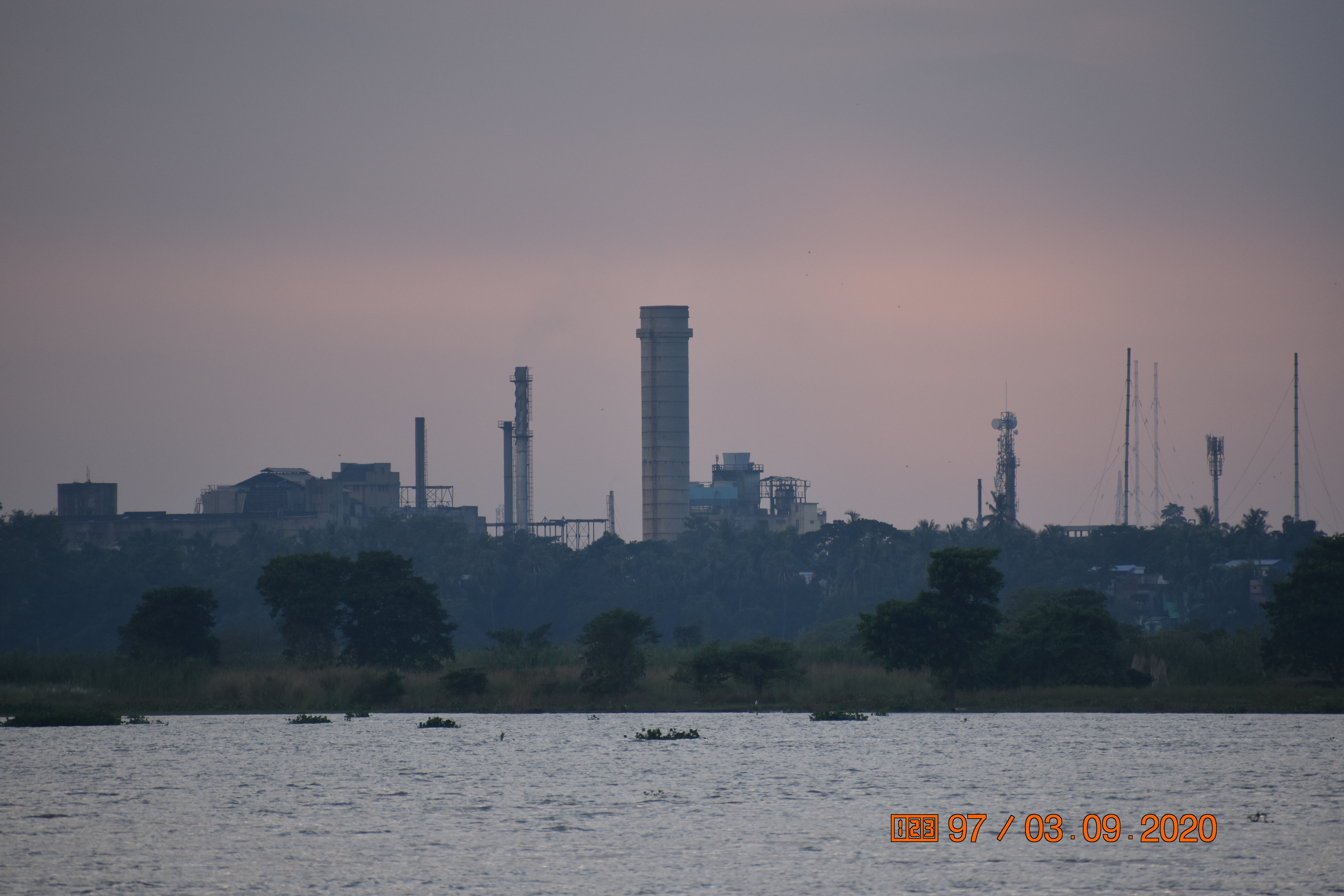
- Bandel Thermal Power Plant
- Official name: Bandel Thermal Power Station
- Country: India
- Location: Tribeni (near Bandel), West Bengal
- Coordinates: 22°59′42.6″N 88°24′18.9″E
- Status: Operational
- Commission date: Unit 1: September 4, 1965; Unit 2: October 18, 1965; Unit 3: February 17, 1966; Unit 4: August 3, 1966; Unit 5: March 20, 1983
- Owner: West Bengal Power Development Corporation
- Operator: West Bengal Power Development Corporation

Thermal power station
- Primary fuel: Bituminous Coal

Power generation
- Units operational: 2 x 60 MW; 1 x 215 MW
- Nameplate capacity: 335 MW

External links
- Commons: Related media on Commons

Bandel Thermal Power Station is a coal-based power plant situated on the western bank of Hooghly River at Tribeni, a neighbourhood in Bansberia, near Bandel, in the Indian state of West Bengal, 3 kilometres (1.9 mi) off the Grand Trunk Road/ NH 19 (old numbering NH 2). The power plant is operated by the West Bengal Power Development Corporation Limited (WBPDCL). At the time of its commissioning in 1983, its Unit-5 was first of its kind in Eastern India and fifth in India.

== Operations ==
The power station has 3 operational units with a total installed capacity of 335 MW (2x60, 1x215 MW). The electricity generated is distributed by WBSEDCL to the residents of West Bengal (excepting Kolkata). All of the units are coal based thermal power stations. During the fiscal year 2006-07 the plant consumed a total of 1.68 million metric tons (1.85 million short tons) of coal. The coal required by the power station is supplied by Coal India Limited. 90% of the coal requirement is sourced from indigenous mines and the remaining 10% is imported. Coal is transported to the power plant by Indian Railways.

The average plant load factor of Bandel Thermal Power Station for the fiscal year 2011-12 was 47.11%. Its auxiliary power consumption for the fiscal year 2011-12 was between 11.51%, which is greater than the national average of 8.44%.

== Future developments ==
Bandel Thermal Power Station Unit-5 (215 MW) is selected for the Coal Fired Generation Rehabilitation Project funded by World Bank for demonstrating Energy Efficiency Rehabilitation & Modernization (EE R&M). As a part of this project, World Bank has earmarked US$180 million of IBRD loan and US$37.9 million of GEF grants for the Component-1. WBPDCL has signed a contract with M/s Doosan Heavy Industries & Construction Company, Korea (DHIC) and their associate on February 29, 2012, for energy efficiency renovation & modernization of Unit-5 of Bandel Thermal Power Station.
