= Zafar Khan Ghazi Mosque and Dargah =

Monument in West Bengal, India

Mosque and Dargah of Zafar Khan Ghazi
- জাফর খান গাজী মসজিদ ও দরগাহ
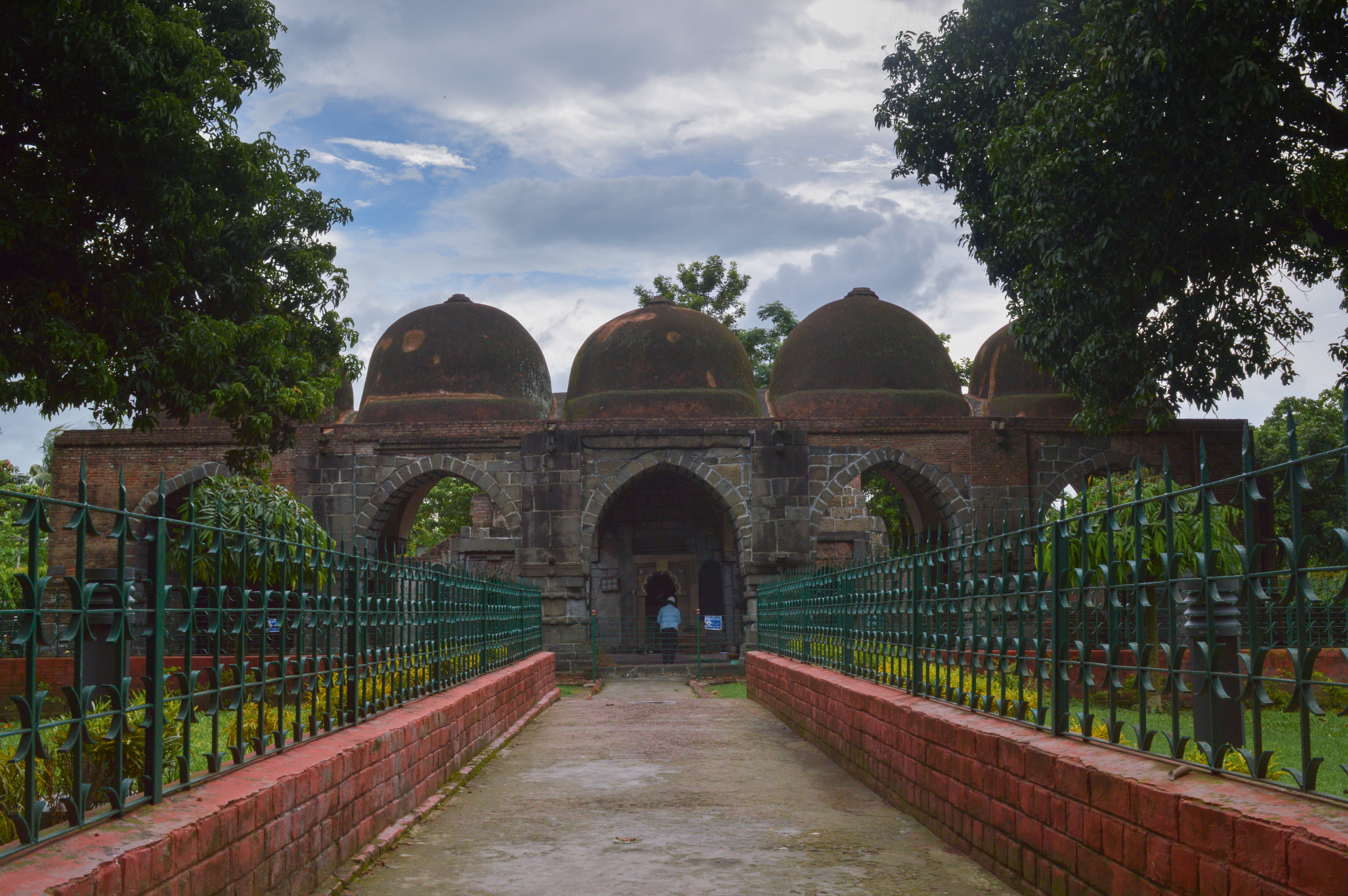
- View of the Zafar Khan Ghazi Mosque, Tribeni

- Location of the monument in West Bengal

Religion
- Affiliation: Islam (former)
- Ecclesiastical or organisational status: Mosque (former) Madrasa (former) Dargah (active)
- Status: Inactive (as a mosque); Partial ruinous state

Location
- Location: Zafar Khan Ghazi Mosque and Dargah, Shibpur, Tribeni, Hooghly District, West Bengal
- Country: India
- Administration: Archaeological Survey of India
- Coordinates: 22°58′46″N 88°24′04″E

Architecture
- Type: Mosque architecture
- Style: Indo-Islamic
- Completed: 1298; 728 years ago

Specifications
- Length: 23.38 m (76.7 ft)
- Width: 10.53 m (34.5 ft)
- Materials: Brick, Stone

Monument of National Importance
- Official name: Dargah of Zafar Khan Gazi
- Reference no.: N-WB-72

Zafar Khan Ghazi Mosque and Dargah (Bengali: জাফর খাঁ গাজী মসজিদ এবং দরগাহ), officially known as Dargah of Zafar Khan (Bengali: জাফর খাঁ দরগাহ) is one of the earliest surviving Muslim monument in Bengal. The mosque was built by Zafar Khan Ghazi, a general of Delhi in 1298 AD (696 AH). The tomb of Zafar Khan, built in 1315 AD (713 AH) is the earliest extant of mausoleum in eastern India. The mosque was built using stones from Hindu temples. The original structure was also probably used as a madrasa.

== History ==
The Zafar Khan Ghazi Mosque is traditionally dated to 1298 AD based on an Arabic inscription above the central mihrab. However, the 1298 inscription describes the building as a madrasa rather than a mosque, raising questions about its original function. The mosque's qibla wall contains several inscriptions from the 13th to early 16th centuries, some of which are not original to the structure, suggesting later modifications or reuse of materials. Architectural elements from later periods further indicate renovations over time. Another monument in Tribeni, also patronized by Zafar Khan, is similarly inscribed as a madrasa but serves as a tomb, locally believed to be Zafar Khan's burial site. An inscription dated 1313 within the tomb’s sarcophagus may refer to the mosque or a related structure as a madrasa.

== Architecture ==
=== Mosque Architecture ===
The mosque, an oblong edifice measuring 23.38 by 10.53 m (76.7 by 34.5 ft) externally, represents the earliest extant example of the brick and stone architectural style introduced by Muslim rulers in Bengal, supplanting the traditional Hindu method of stacking rectangular cut stones without mortar. The stones used in constructing the Mosque were repurposed from Hindu temples, indicated by the stone carving of Hindu deities present on certain blocks. Over time, the original structure has undergone multiple reconstructions.

=== Tomb of Zafar Khan ===
In the eastern yard of the mosque, there are two square chambers constructed side by side. The western chamber contains the graves of Zafar Khan Ghazi and his wife, while four graves are positioned on a masonry platform in the eastern chamber. The walls of both chambers are constructed of materials, such as rectangular-shaped stone blocks, taken from older Hindu temples. The roof of the tomb is nonexistent. The northern wall has a door in the middle part of it adorned with a trefoil arch, through which both of the chambers can be accessed. The northern wall of the tomb has frames taken from Hindu temples, as evidenced by the carving of Hindu deities in it. The walls of the eastern room also have temple materials with depictions of Ramayana and Mahabharata carved in them. Similar stone sculptures also exist in the plinths of the outer face of the tomb. Although, the structures do not conform to the architectural conventions of either a Hindu temple or a Muslim tomb, suggesting they were likely constructed on an ad hoc basis using extracted materials from temples.

=== Inscriptions ===
One of the inscriptions at the site reads as follows:

Zafar Khan, the lion of lions, has appeared

By conquering the towns of India in every expedition, and by restoring the decayed charitable institutions.

And he has destroyed the obdurate among infidels with his sword and spear, and lavished the treasures of his wealth in (helping) the miserable.

== Gallery ==
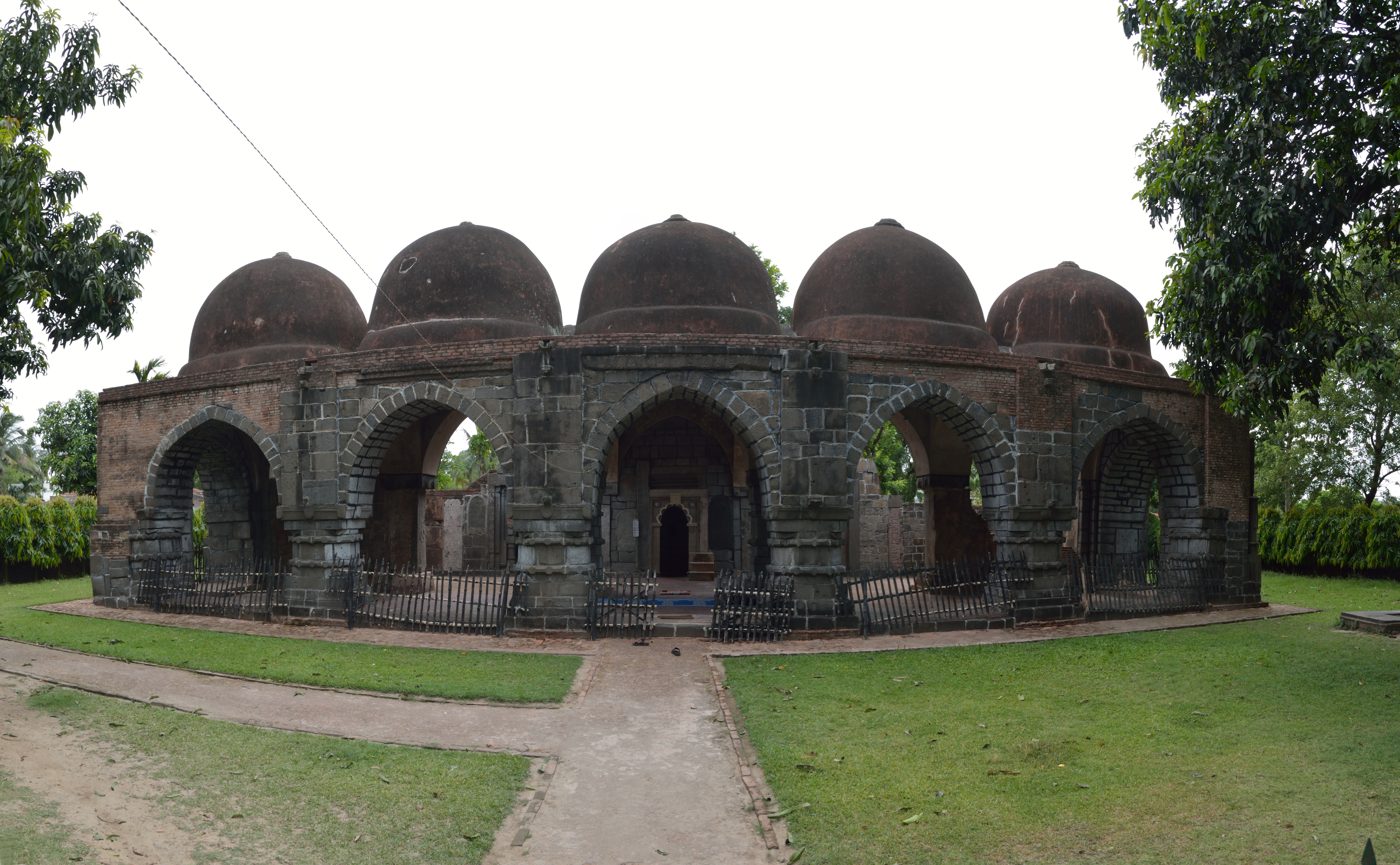
Full view of the mosque structure

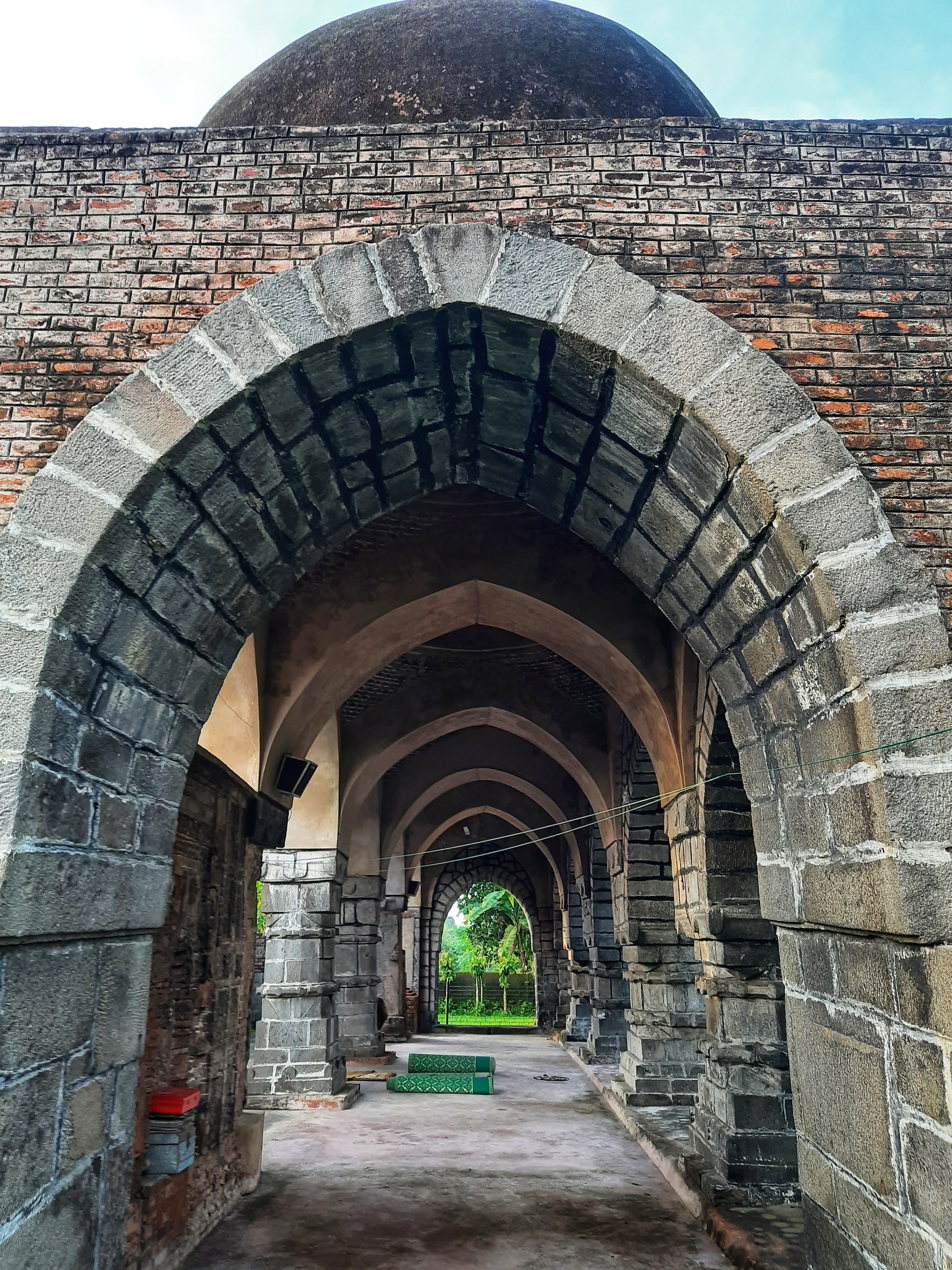
Entrance of the former mosque

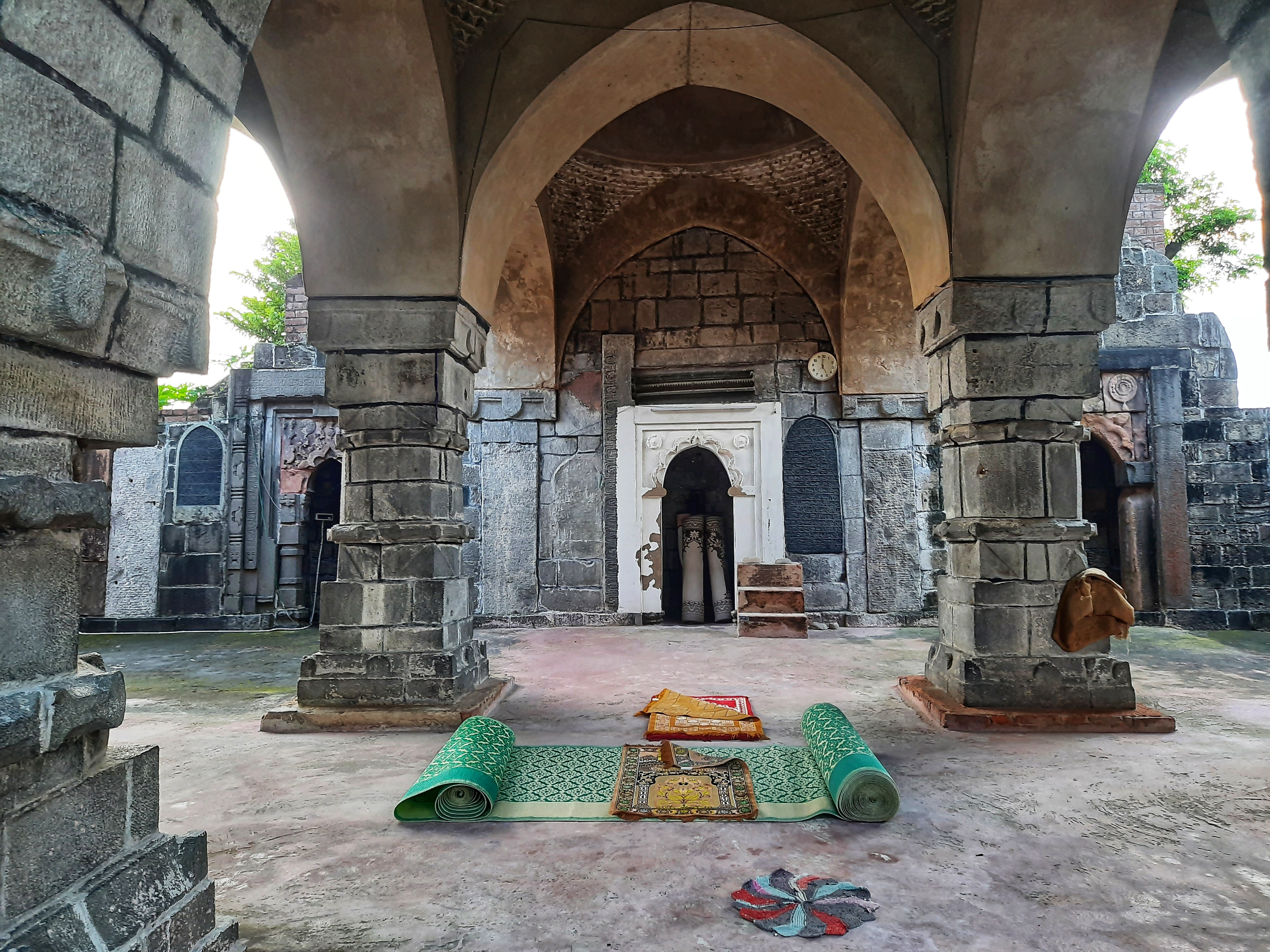
Interior of the mosque

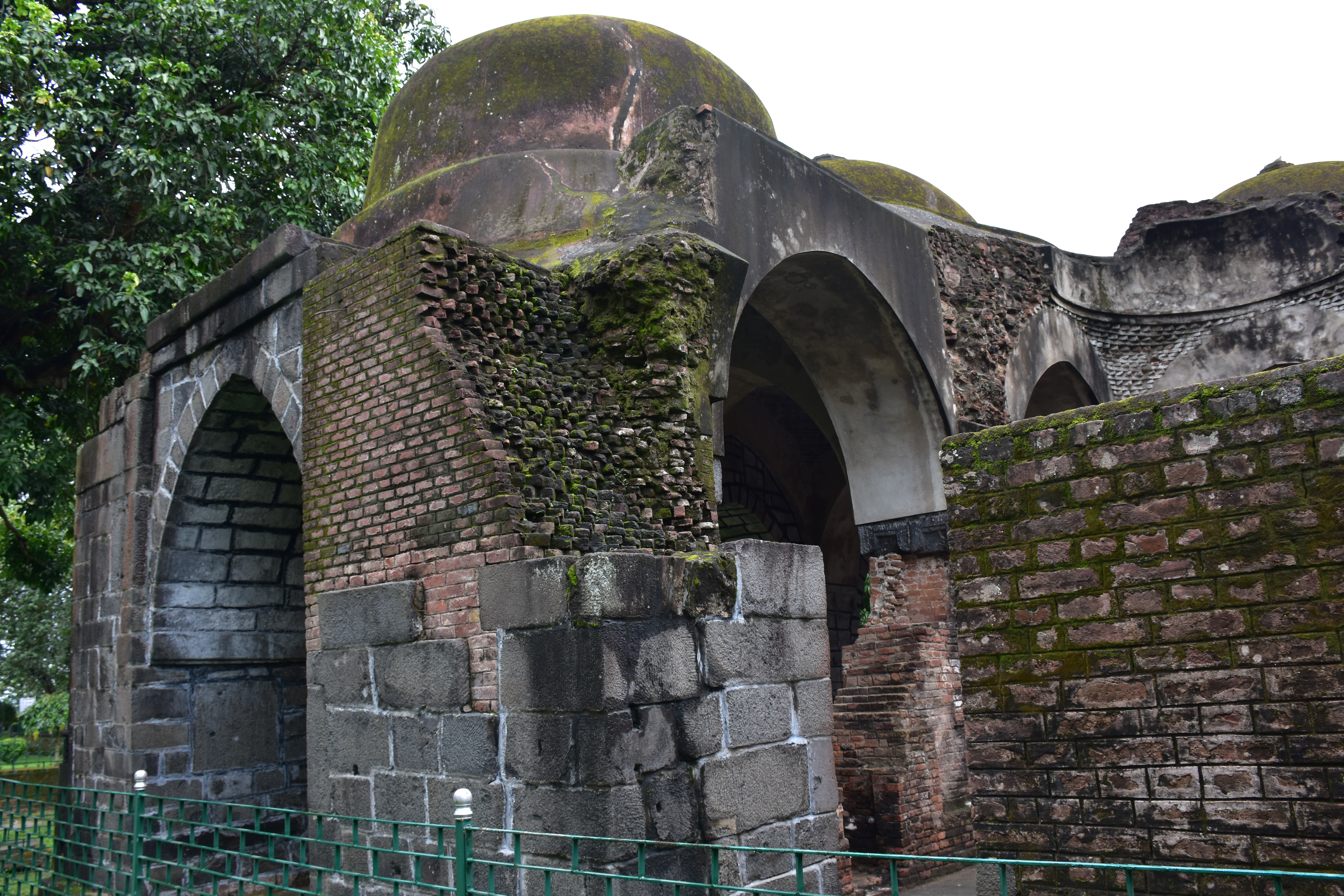
Back view of the mosque

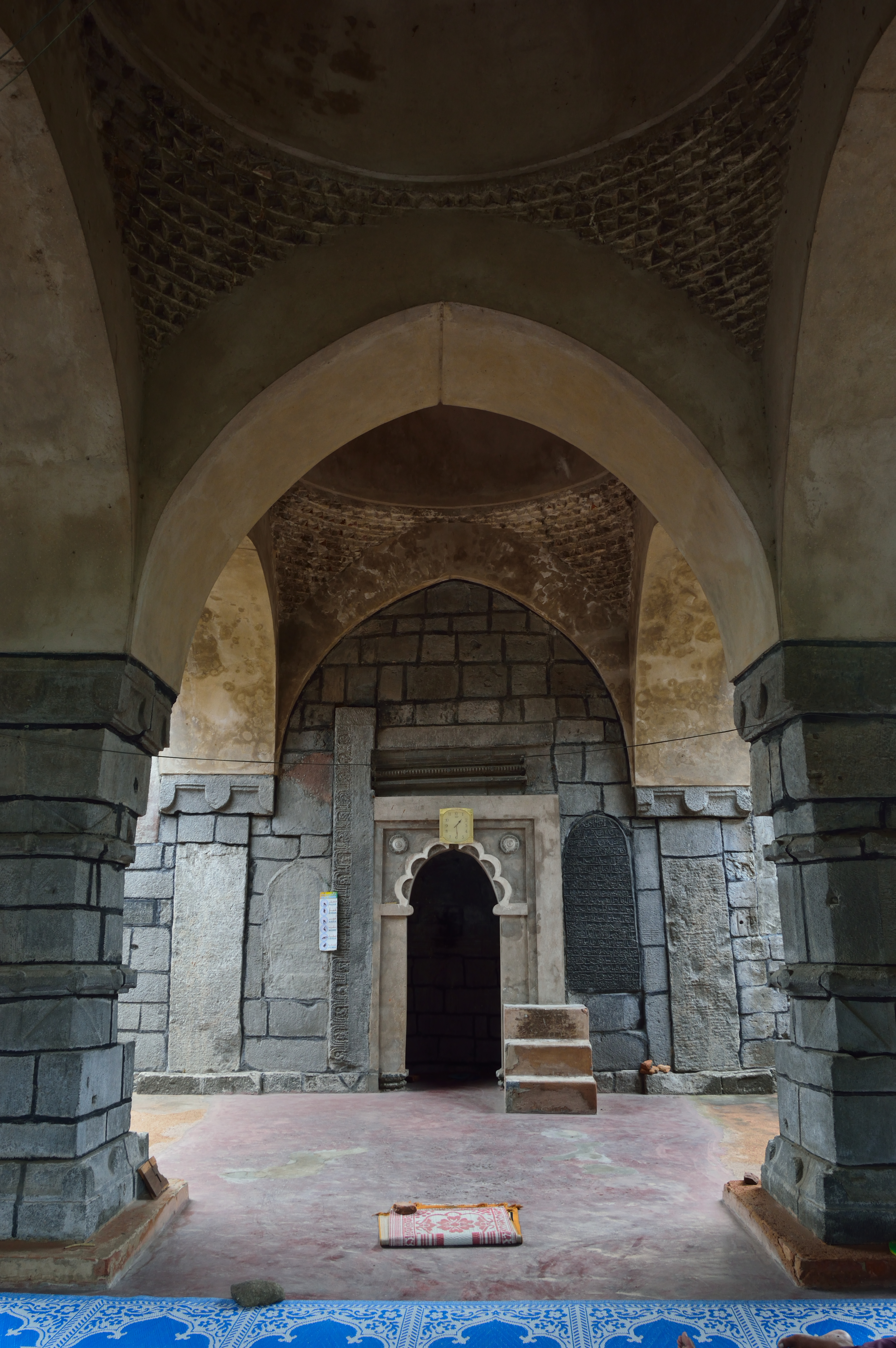
Central mihrab of the mosque

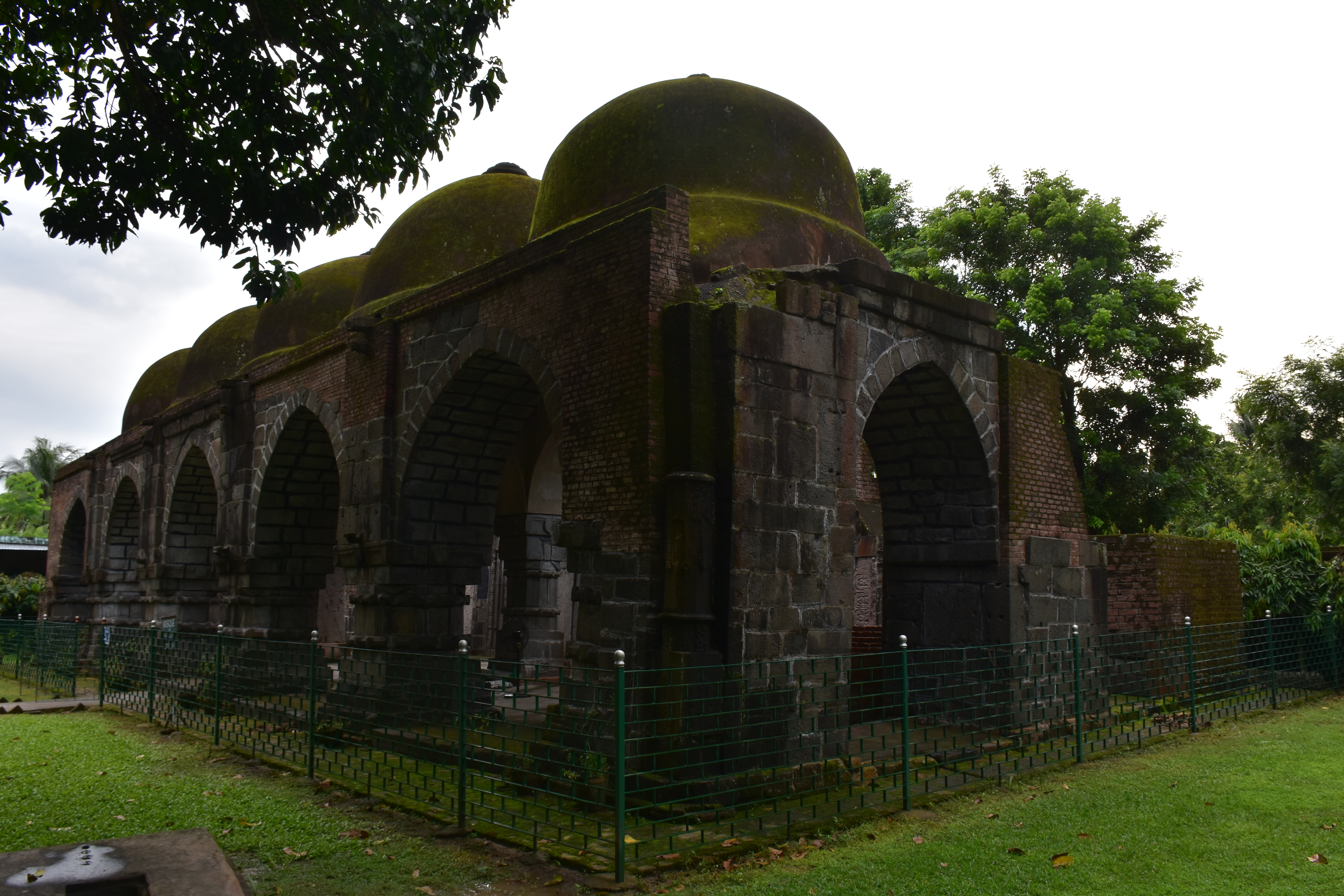
Right side view

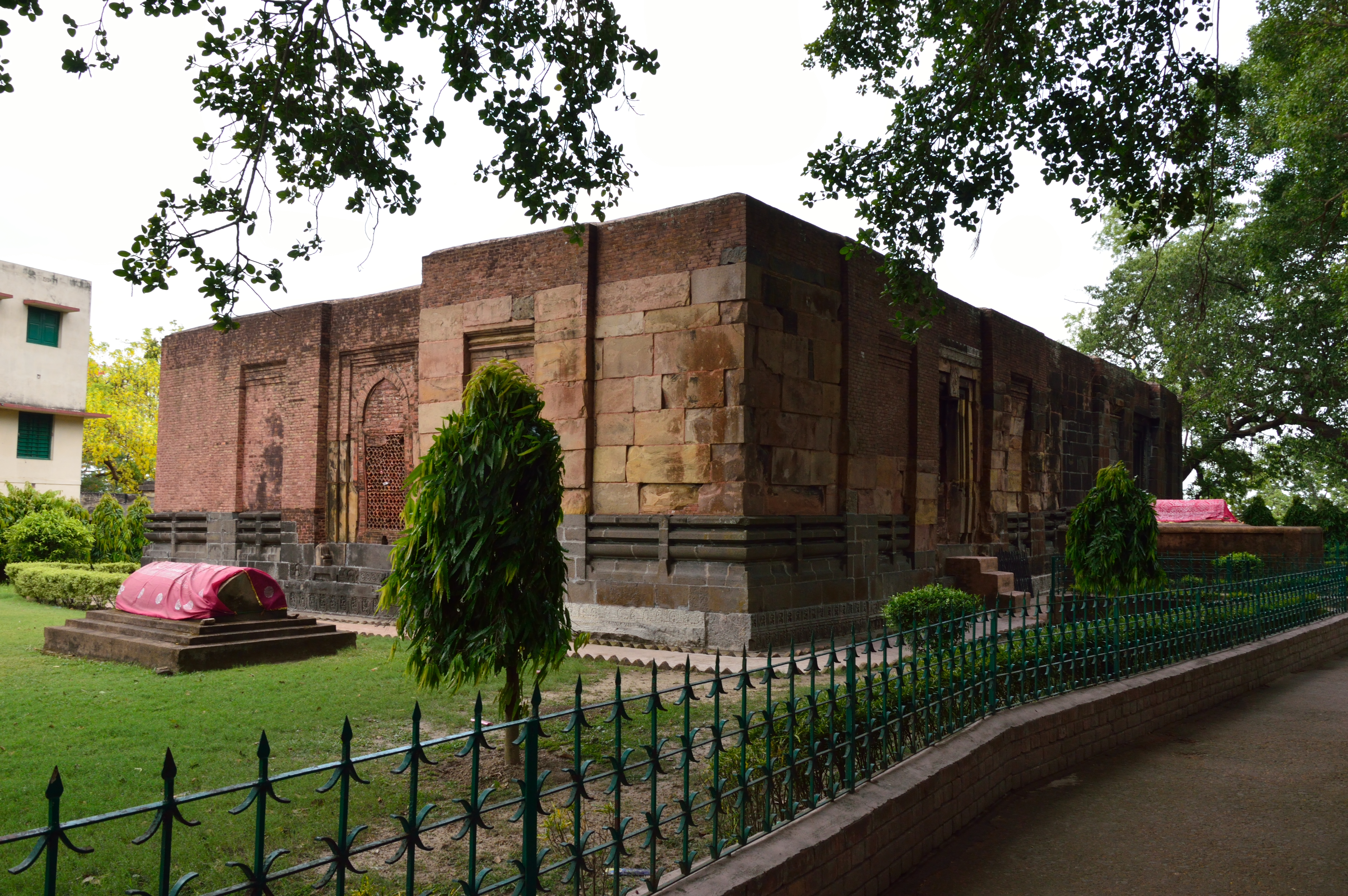
Tomb complex of Zafar Khan Ghazi

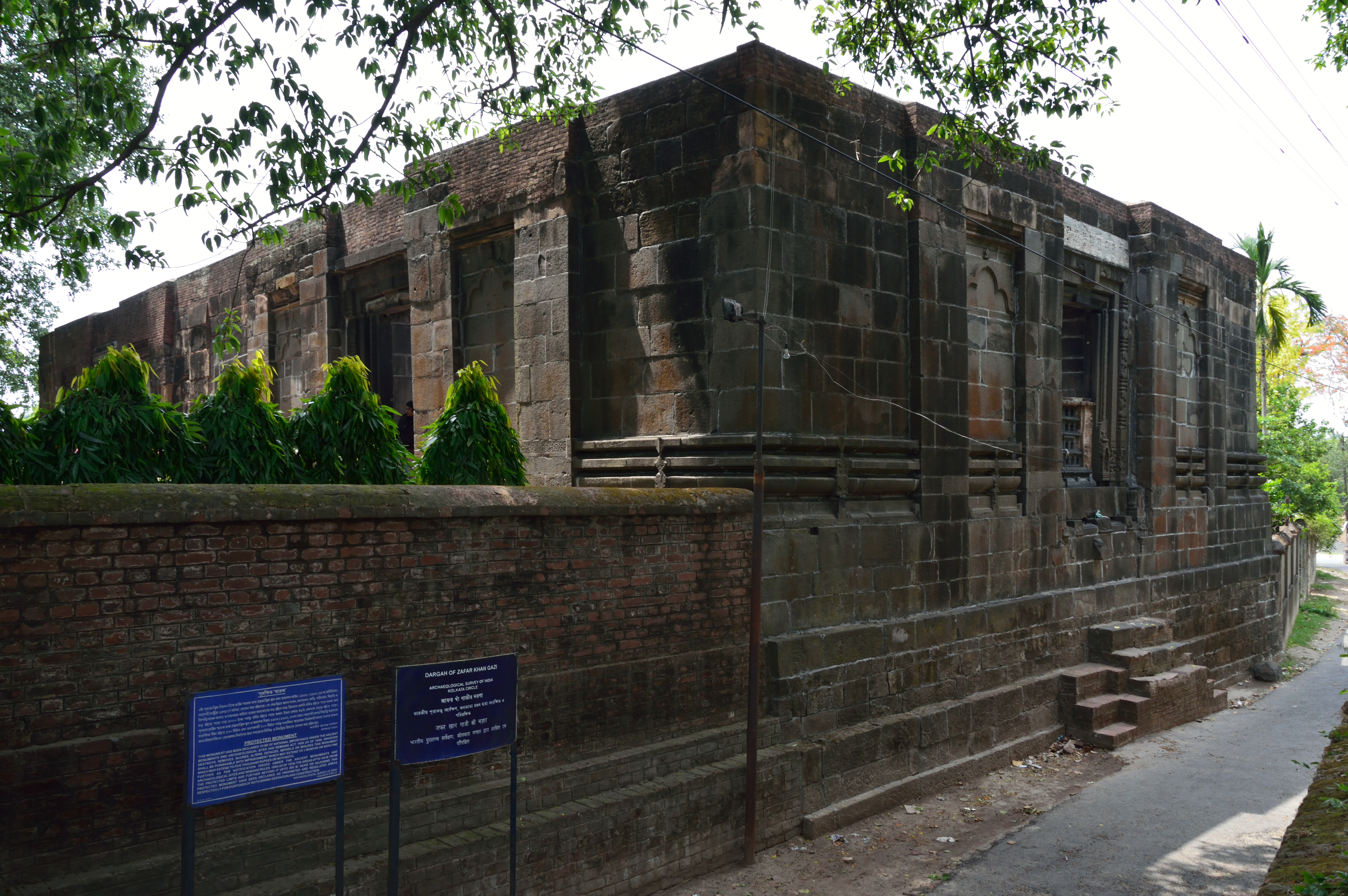
Tomb on the road side

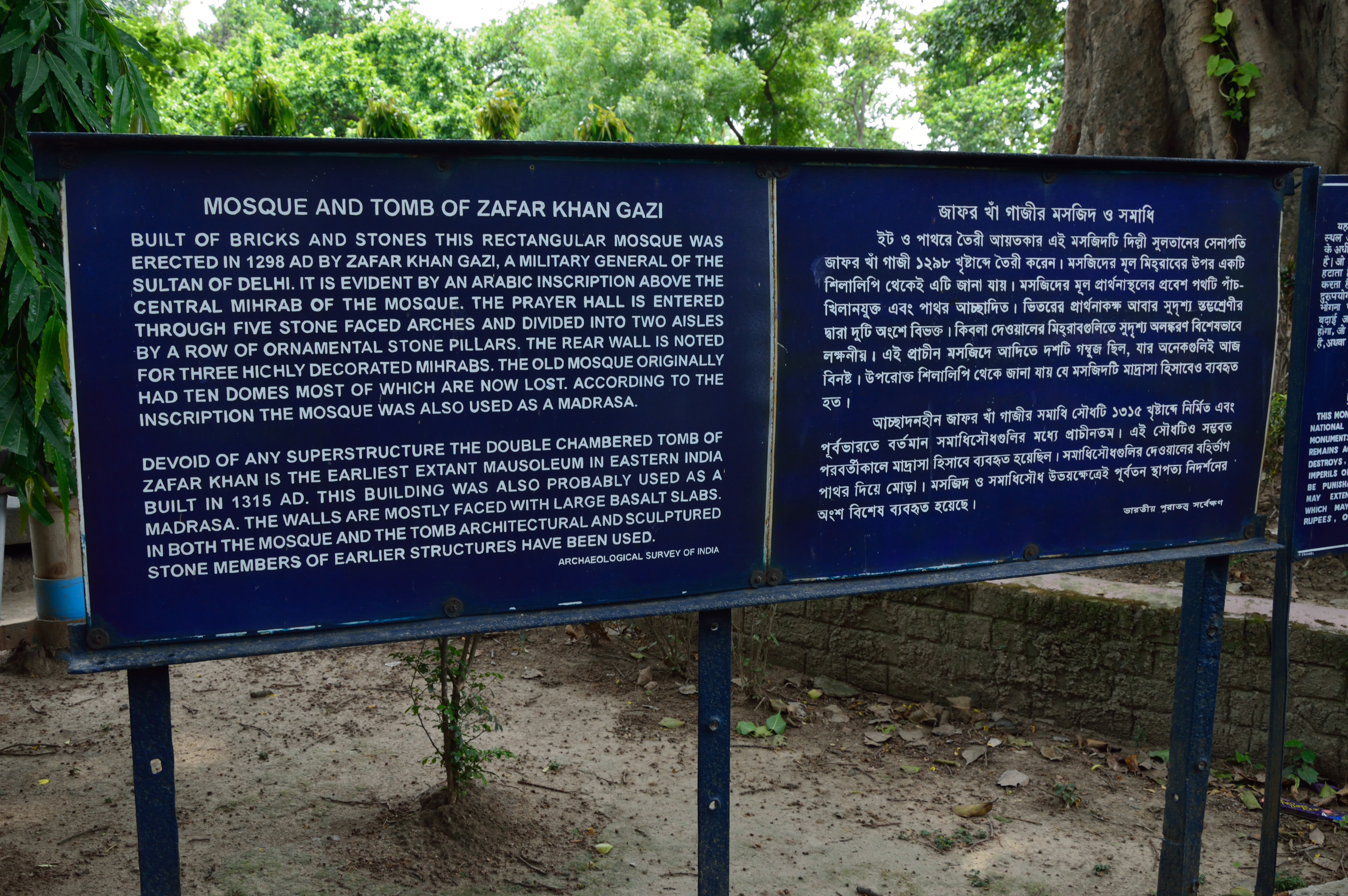
ASI description of Zafar Khan Ghazi Mosque and Dargah

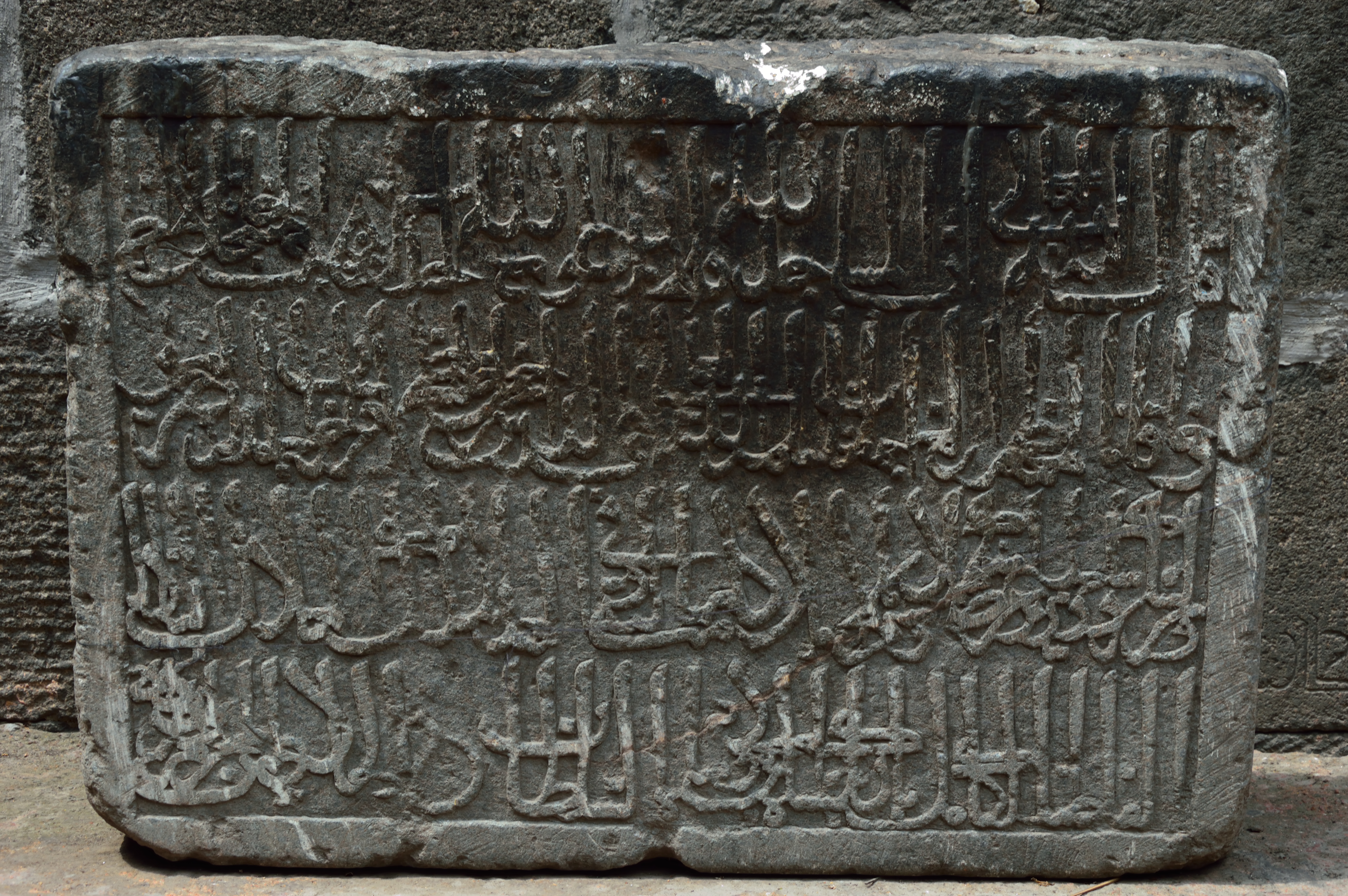
Mosque inscription

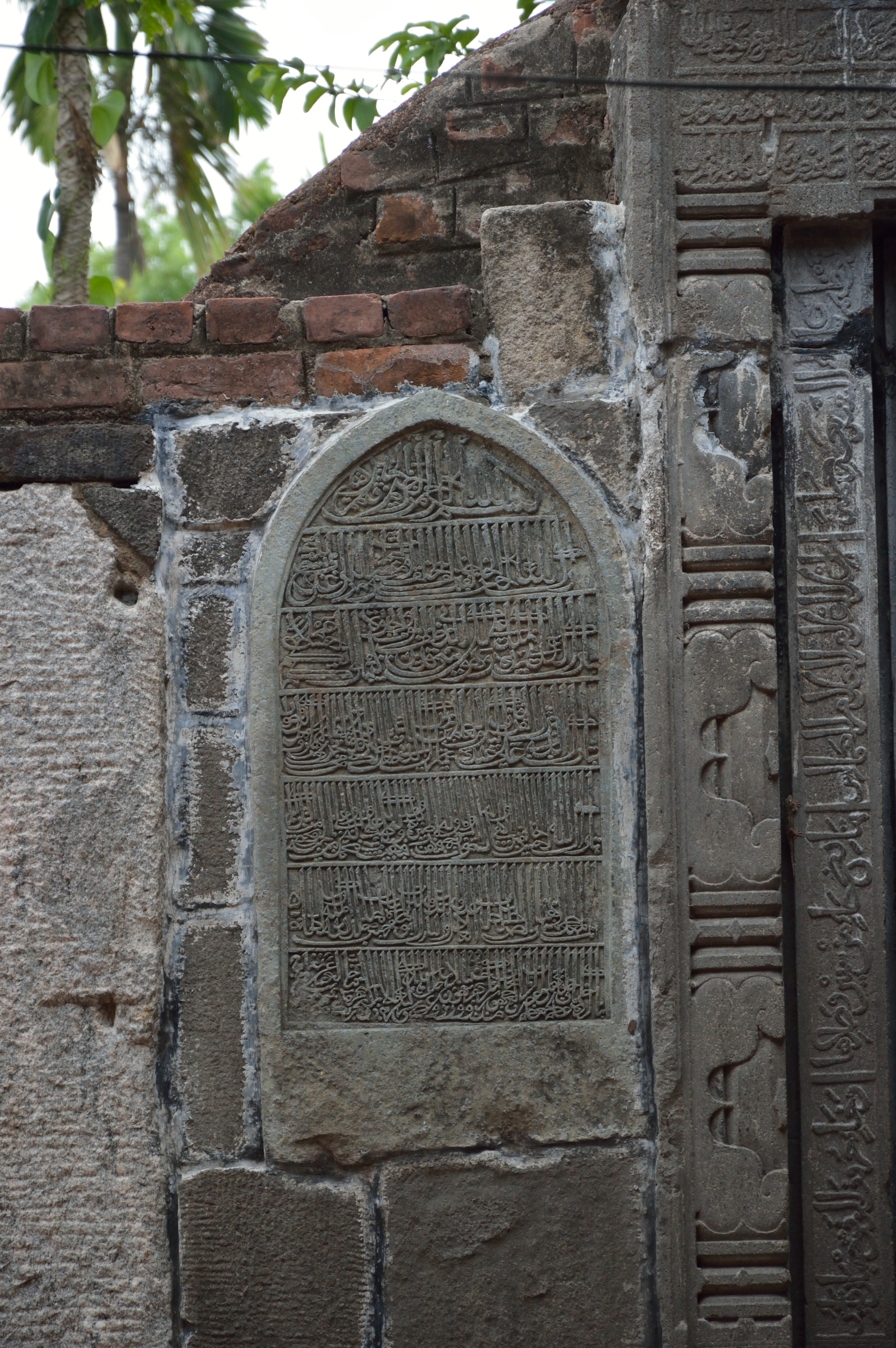
Stone inscription on the wall

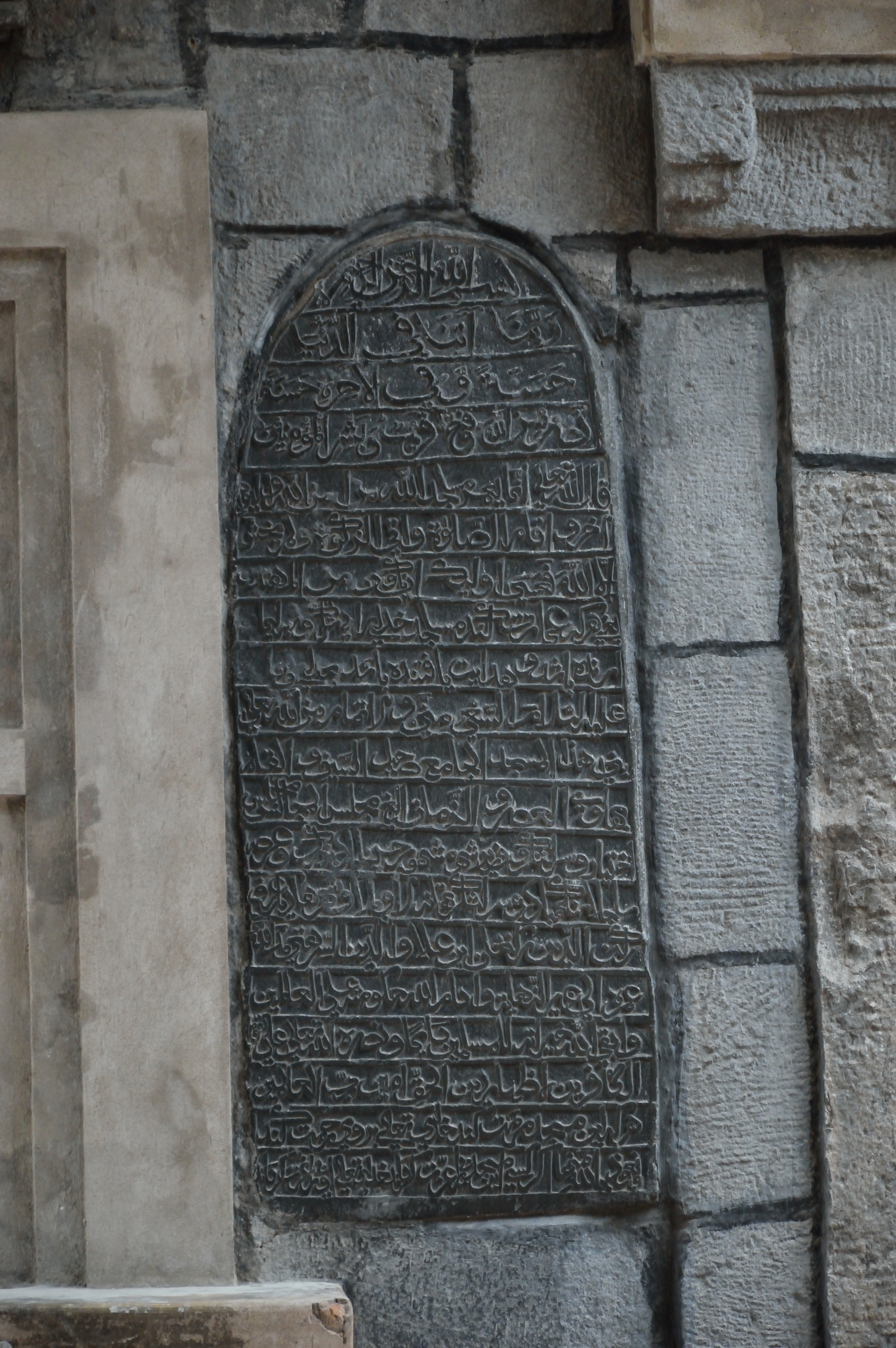
Stone inscription on qibla wall

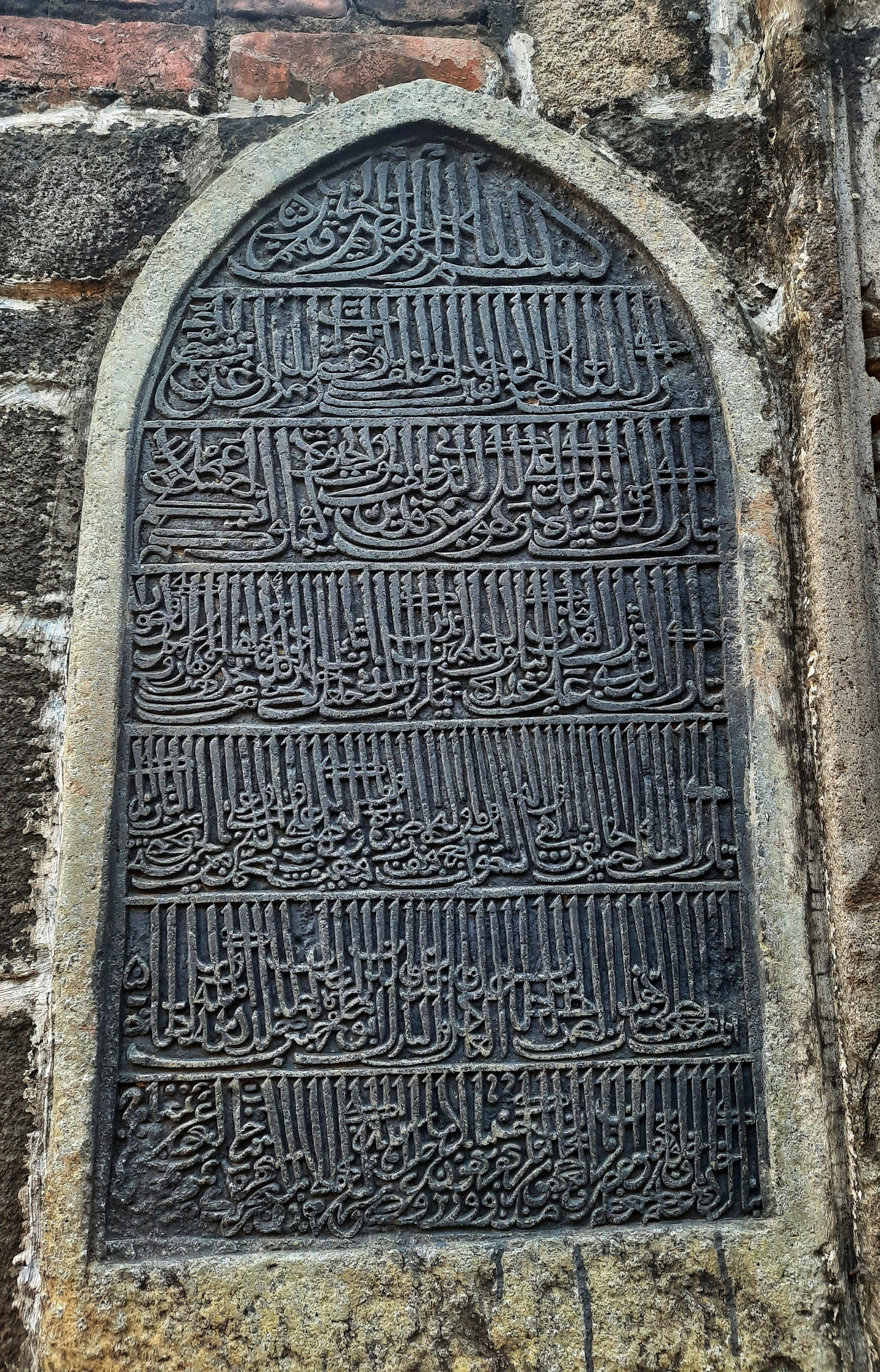
Inscription on wall

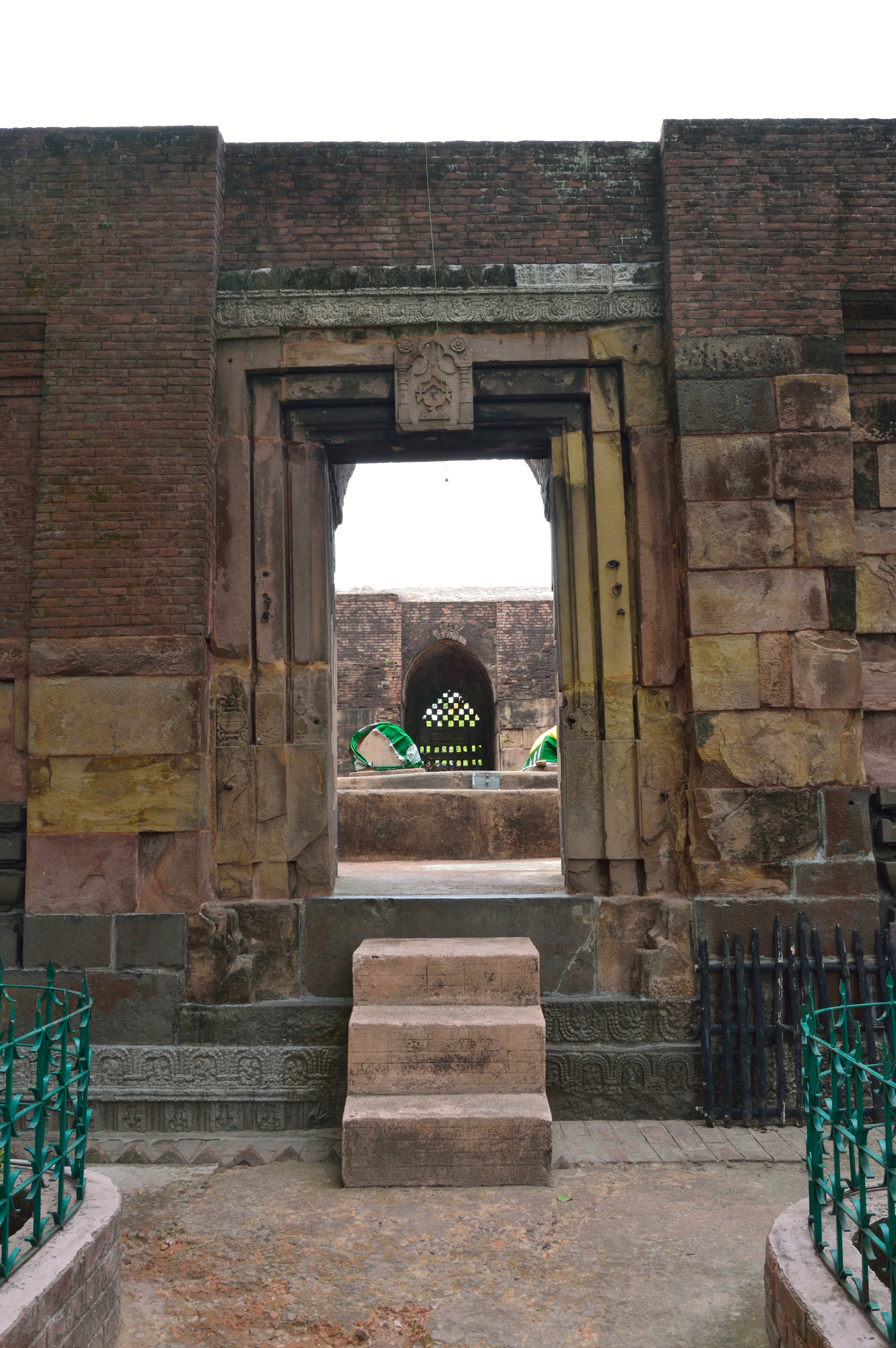
Eastern doorway of eastern chamber

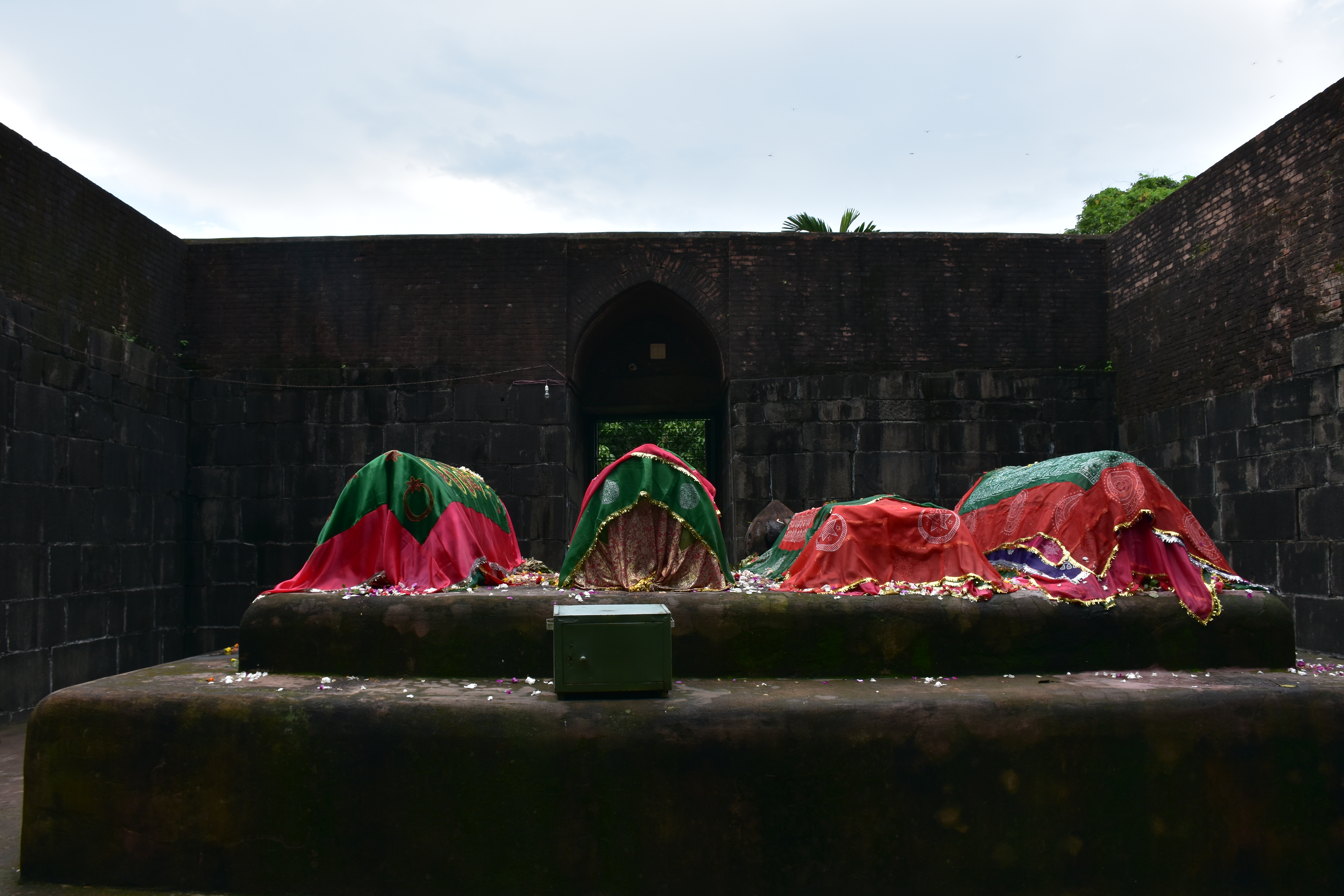
Eastern chamber containing four graves

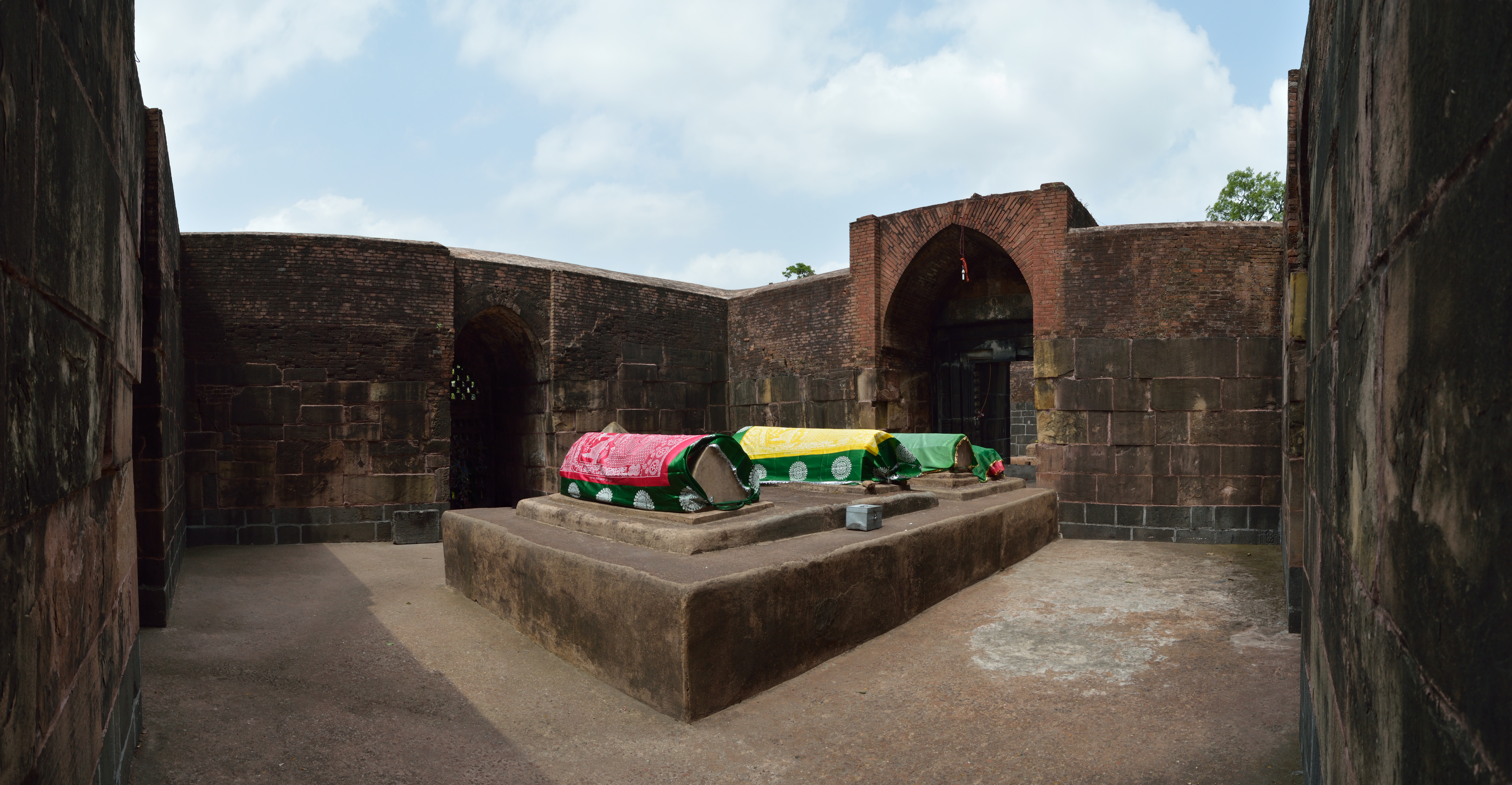
Western housing two graves - those of Zafar Khan Ghazi and his wife

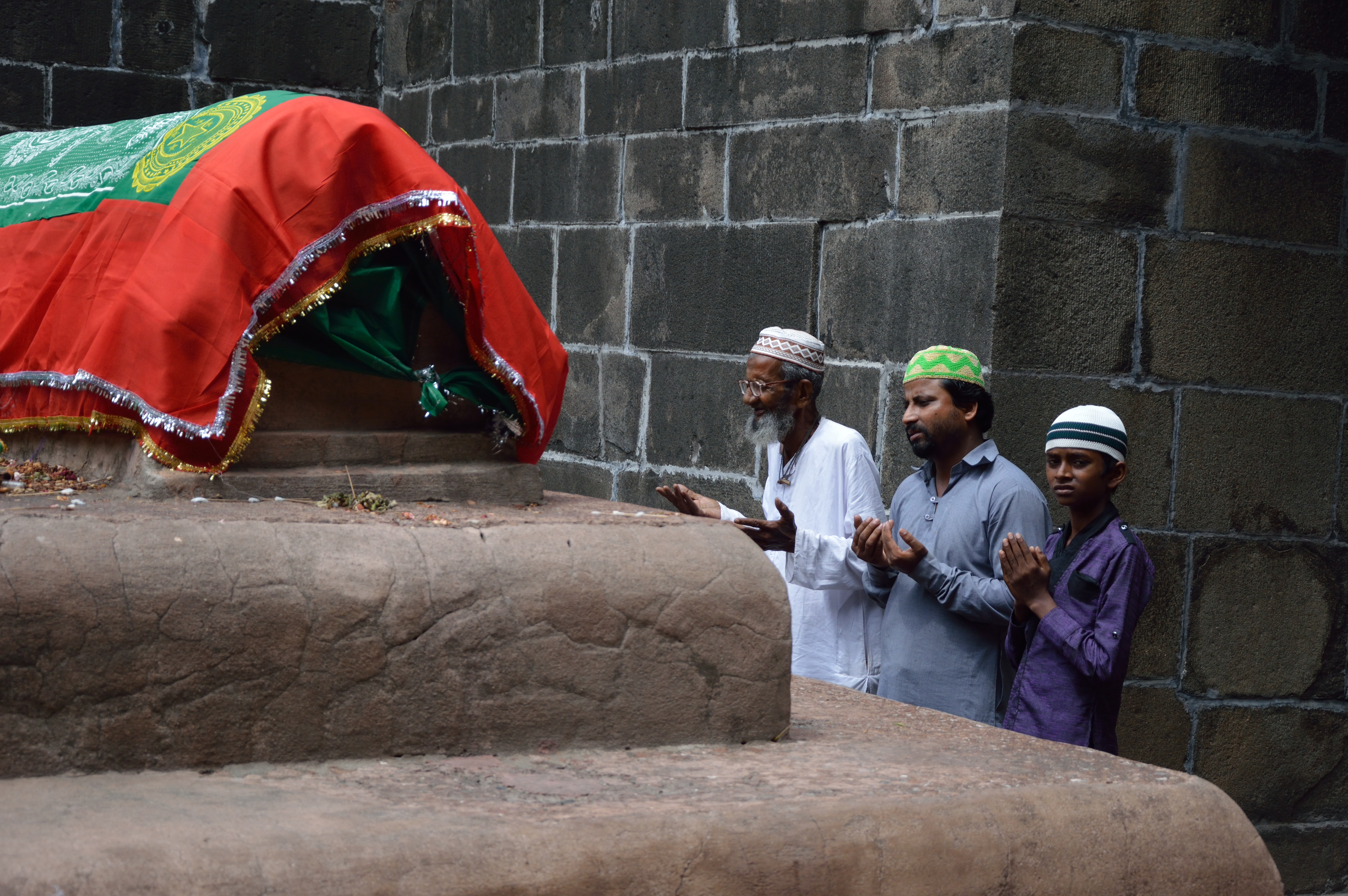
The dargah is active for visitors and pilgrims

== See also ==
- Lattan Mosque
- Mausoleum of Khan Jahan Ali
- Zinda Pir's Tomb Complex
- List of Monuments of National Importance in West Bengal
