= Jagannath Tarka Panchanan =

Indian scholar

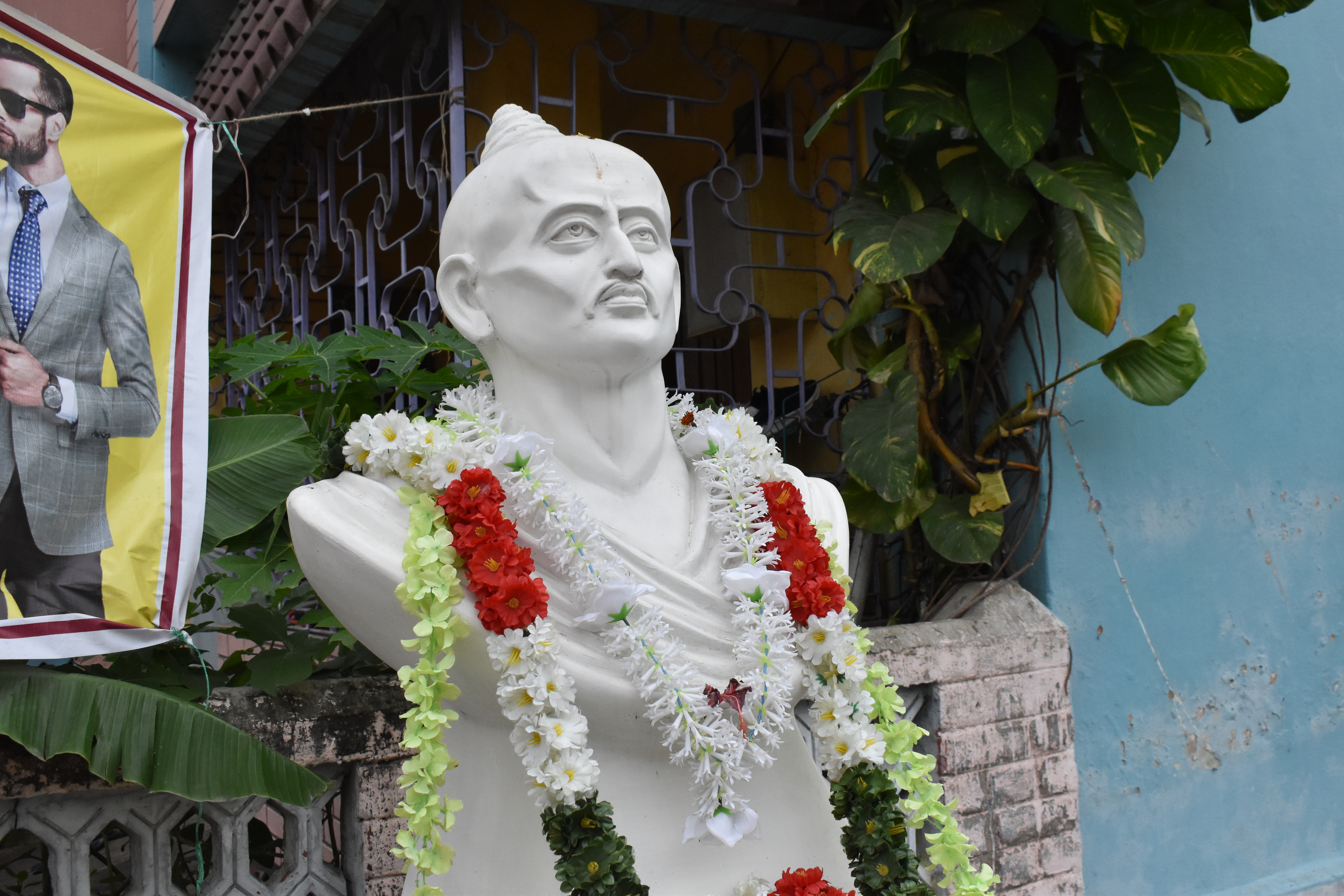
- Statue of Jagannath Tarka Panchanan at Tribeni
- Born: 23 September 1695; Tribeni, Hooghly, West Bengal, India
- Died: 1806 (aged 110–111)
- Parent: Rudradeva Bhattacharji (father)

Jagannath Tarka Panchanan (23 September 1695 – 1806) was an eminent Sanskrit scholar and pandit of Hindu Law.

== Biography ==
Tarka Panchanan (sometimes called Jagannātha Tarkapañchānana) was born in Tribeni in 1695. He was the son of Rudradeva Bhattacharjee, a poor Brahmin of Tribeni, Hooghly district. He obtained great respect by the highest Hindu nobles and the Hindu community. Tarka Panchanan had a wonderful memory and became a remarkable logician and unrivaled in his knowledge of Hindu law. He was a great teacher and had immense knowledge on all branches of the Dharmasastras. Tarka Panchanan assisted Sir William Jones in his endeavour to compile Vivadabhangarnava, which literally means 'a break wave on the ocean of disputes', and reconcile the schools of Hindu jurisprudence. He assisted judges to familiarise with the Indian culture as a consequence of a parliamentary mandate to perform judicial duties. The text was reprinted in three volumes in 1801 at Calcutta and London under the title A Digest of Hindu Law, on contracts and successions (originally published in four volumes, in Calcutta, at the Honourable Company's Press, 1797-1798), which tried to legitimise the transformation of the prescriptive guidelines enshrined in the Sastras into legal rules to be directly administered through court by using terminologies like Digest. Tarka Panchanan taught Sanskrit to Robert Clive. He supposedly introduced Durga Puja in Tribeni.
