= Saraswati River (West Bengal) =

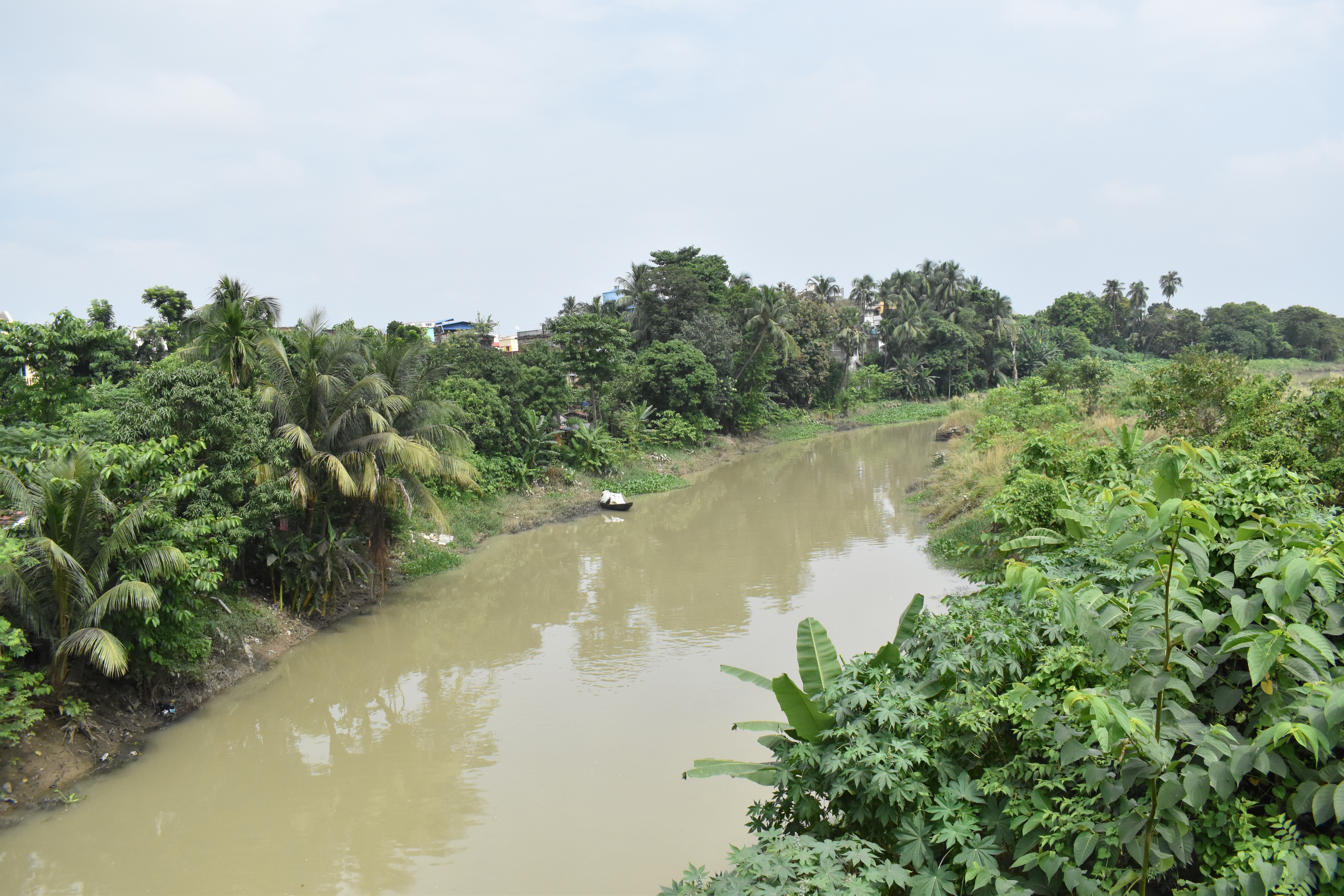
- Native name: সরস্বতী (Bengali)

Location
- Country: India
- State: West Bengal

Physical characteristics
- Source: Hooghly
  - location: Tribeni
- Mouth: Hooghly
  - location: Sankrail
  - coordinates: 22°33′31″N 88°14′01″E
- Discharge
  - location: Sankrail

Saraswati is a river in Hooghly and Howrah district of West Bengal. The river drains western end of the Kolkata metropolitan area, which area belong to Chinsurah, Chandannagar, Srirampore and Howrah Sadar subdivision. The Saraswati river originates on the western bank of the Hooghly river at Tribeni, the river generally flows south-west through Singur and Dankuni area before reaching Chanditala at Domjur. Passing the Chanditala, the river flows southeast and finally it joins the Hooghly river at Sankrail.

The course of the river has been turned into a canal, drying up most of the stream. The river carries sewage mixed with urban waste, but the source and estuary of the river receives inflows of water from the Hooghly river.

The description of this river is found in Rennell's 'Systematic Survey' in 1776 AD. Saraswati River is also mentioned in Bengali literature, especially in Manasamangal Kāvya.
