= CSI =

CSI may refer to:

== Arts, entertainment, and media ==
=== CSI franchise ===
- CSI (franchise)
  - CSI: Crime Scene Investigation, the original CSI television series, set in Las Vegas
  - CSI: Miami, the first spin-off series starring David Caruso
  - CSI: NY, the second spin-off series starring Gary Sinise
  - CSI: Cyber, the third spin-off series starring Patricia Arquette
  - CSI: Vegas, the fourth spin-off series and a sequel to the original
  - CSI: Trilogy, the three-part television event featuring the casts of CSI: Crime Scene Investigation, CSI: Miami, and CSI: NY
  - CSI (comics)
  - CSI (novels)
  - CSI (video games)
  - CSI: The Experience, a traveling exhibition

=== Music ===
- Consorzio Suonatori Indipendenti, an Italian musical group
- CSI:Ambleside, a 2008 album by British band Half Man Half Biscuit

=== Other arts, entertainment, and media ===
- CSI Sanatan, 2023 Indian Telugu-language film by Sivashankar Dev
- Carnaby Street (radio programme), Saturday morning Manx Radio broadcast featuring music and news from the 1960s

== Enterprises and organizations ==
- Centre for Social Impact, a network of research centres across four Australian universities
- Centre for Social Innovation, a social enterprise based in Toronto, Canada
- Centre for Social Investigation, an interdisciplinary research group in Oxford, England
- City Supermarket, Inc., a grocery chain based in Pangasinan, Philippines
- Coimisiún Sábháilteachta Iarnróid, the Railway Safety Commission of Ireland
- Computer Security Institute, a former professional association in the United States
- Computer Society of India, a professional association
- Computers and Structures, Inc., a structural engineering software company
- Construction Specifications Institute, a technical society in the United States
- Crime Stoppers International
- The Center for Scientific Integrity, American non-profit organization that operates the blog Retraction Watch

== Paranormal ==
- Civilian Saucer Intelligence, an unidentified flying object research group
- Committee for Skeptical Inquiry, an organization for skeptical paranormal investigation

== Places ==
- Cité des Sciences et de l'Industrie in Paris

== Post-nominals ==
- Companion of the Order of the Star of India, a class of the order of chivalry founded by Queen Victoria
- Cross of Solomon Islands, a class of the Order of the Solomon Islands

== Religion ==
- Christian Schools International
- Christian Solidarity International
- Church of Scientology International
- Church of South India

== Schools and educational institutions ==
- Canadian Securities Institute, a financial education company providing professional credentials and compliance courses
- Cité Scolaire Internationale de Grenoble, an international school in Grenoble, France
- Cité Scolaire Internationale de Lyon, an international school in Lyon, France
- College of Southern Idaho, a community college in the United States
- College of Staten Island, part of The City University of New York in the United States

== Sport ==
- Commission Sportive Internationale, a governing body for motor racing
- Concours de Saut International, a ranking system for show jumping
- CueSports International, a pool (pocket billiards) event promotion company and league organizer, affiliated with the Billiard Congress of America

== Technology ==
- Camera Serial Interface, an MIPI Alliance protocol for cameras and mobile devices
- Channel state information, a wireless communication term
- Coherence scanning interferometry, an areal surface topography technique related to 3D interference microscopy
- Common System Interface, a former name of the Intel QuickPath Interconnect, a computer bus
- Control Sequence Introducer, a control character for initiating escape sequences
- Crystalline silicon (c-Si), used in solar cell technology
- Conditional symmetric instability, a form of convective instability in a fluid

== Other uses ==
- California Solar Initiative, a renewable energy program
- Chlorosulfonyl isocyanate
- Complex specified information, an argument for intelligent design
- Container Security Initiative, a program of the U.S. Bureau of Customs and Border Protection
- CSI 300 Index, a stock market index compiled by the China Securities Index Company
- Customer satisfaction index, a metric that reflects the overall customer satisfaction with a company in terms of product quality, customer service, price, etc.

== See also ==
- Crime scene investigation (disambiguation)
