= Peary Mohan Mukherjee =

Indian Bengali zamindar and social reformer (1840–1924)

Raja Peary Mohan Mukherjee
- প্যারীমোহন মুখোপাধ্যায়
- Born: 17 September 1840; Uttarpara, British India (present day West Bengal, India)
- Died: 17 January 1924 (aged 83)
- Education: University of Calcutta
- Successor: Bhupendranath Mukherjee
- Children: Bhupendranath Mukherjee
- Father: Jaykrishna Mukherjee
- Family: Zamindars of Uttarpara

Peary Mohan Mukherjee, CSI (17 September 1840 – 17 January 1924), was an Indian Bengali lawyer and social worker.

== Early life and education ==
Mukherjee was born on 17 September 1840 in Uttarpara, in the Hooghly district of British India (present-day West Bengal, India). He was the second child of Babu Jaykrishna Mukherjee. In 1864, he obtained an M.A. in Science in the first class from the University of Calcutta, followed by a Bachelor of Law (B.L.) degree in 1865.

== Career ==
After completing his law degree, he began practising at the Calcutta High Court. Following his father's death, several complex disputes concerning landed property arose. Peary Mohan resolved these disputes and, like his father, played a significant role in promoting higher education among the residents of Uttarpara. His son, Bhupendranath, subsequently continued these efforts. In 1879, Peary Mohan was nominated as a member of the Bengal Legislative Council. He was also nominated to the Indian Legislative Council in 1884 and 1886. Like his father, he was considerate towards his tenants. During the implementation of the Bengal Tenancy Act (1885), he demonstrated extensive knowledge of zamindari and revenue matters. He was closely associated with the British Indian Association and played a leading role in the National Conference of 1885. Although the British Government had rejected Jaykrishna Mukherjee's proposal to establish a college at Uttarpara, the college envisioned by his father was eventually established in 1887. It is now known as Raja Peary Mohan College. In the same year, the British Government conferred on Peary Mohan the titles of Raja and CSI.

The two-storeyed house built by his grandfather, Jagmohan Mukhopadhyay, had been converted into a three-storeyed building by his father, who also established a charitable dispensary there. The building now houses Uttarpara State General Hospital. Opposite the hospital, Peary Mohan constructed Rajendra Bhavan, which currently serves as accommodation for the hospital's doctors.

== Death ==
Mukherjee died on 17 January 1924. A bust of him was installed at the college named after him in Uttarpara.
