= List of knights bachelor appointed in 1913 =

Knight Bachelor is the oldest and lowest-ranking form of knighthood in the British honours system; it is the rank granted to a man who has been knighted by the monarch but not inducted as a member of one of the organised orders of chivalry. Women are not knighted; in practice, the equivalent award for a woman is appointment as Dame Commander of the Order of the British Empire (founded in 1917).

== Knights bachelor appointed in 1913 ==
| Date | Name | Notes | Ref |
|---|---|---|---|
| 1 January 1913 | Lt-Col. Horatio Arthur Yorke, CB | Chief Inspecting Officer of Railways under the Board of Trade | |
| 1 January 1913 | Rowland Bailey, CB, MVO, ISO | Controller of His Majesty's Stationery Office | |
| 1 January 1913 | George Watson Shaw, CSI | Indian Civil Service, Judicial Commissioner, Upper Burma | |
| 1 January 1913 | George William Forrest, CIE | late Officer in Charge of Records, Government of India | |
| 1 January 1913 | Thomas Benjamin Bowring | | |
| 1 January 1913 | Frank Brown | | |
| 1 January 1913 | Francis Darwin, DSc, FRS | | |
| 1 January 1913 | Richard Walter Essex, MP | | |
| 1 January 1913 | John Arthur Godwin | | |
| 1 January 1913 | Arthur Holland | | |
| 1 January 1913 | Arthur Lasenby Liberty | | |
| 1 January 1913 | Richard Mathias | | |
| 1 January 1913 | Andrew Hislop Pettigrew | | |
| 1 January 1913 | Robert William Philip, MD, FRS | | |
| 1 January 1913 | Frank Ree | General Manager of the London and North-Western Railway | |
| 1 January 1913 | James Dods-Shaw | | |
| 1 January 1913 | Stewart Stockman, MRCVS | Chief Veterinary Officer to the Board of Agriculture | |
| 1 January 1913 | Frederick Williams-Taylor | Manager of the Bank of Montreal, resident in London | |
| 1 January 1913 | Corbet Woodall | Governor of the Gas Light and Coke Company | |
| 1 January 1913 | William Henry Wilkinson | His Majesty's Consul-General at Mukden | |
| 1 January 1913 | Frederick Alexander Robertson | Indian Civil Service, Judge of the Chief Court of the Punjab | |
| 1 January 1913 | William Henry Hoare Vincent | Indian Civil Service, Secretary to the Government of India, Legislative Department | |
| 1 January 1913 | Charles Herbert Armstrong | Additional Member of the Council of the Governor-General of India | |
| 1 January 1913 | Herbert William Cameron Carnduff, CIE | Indian Civil Service, a puisne judge of the High Court of Judicature at Fort William in Bengal | |
| 1 January 1913 | Henry Vernon Drake-Brockman, MA, LLM | Indian Civil Service, Judicial Commissioner for the Central Provinces | |
| 1 January 1913 | Tarak Nath Palit | | |
| 1 January 1913 | Alfred George Lascelles | Chief Justice of the Island of Ceylon | |
| 1 January 1913 | William Rees Davies | Chief Justice of the Supreme Court of the Colony of Hong Kong | |
| 1 January 1913 | The Hon. Auguste Real Angers, KC | Member of the King's Privy Council for Canada | |
| 1 January 1913 | Walter Clarke Buchanan | Member of the House of Representatives of the Dominion of New Zealand | |
| 1 January 1913 | John Stephen Willison, LLD | | |
| 1 January 1913 | David Hardie, MD | | |
| 1 January 1913 | George Turner, MB | Formerly Medical Officer of Health, Transvaal, and Medical Superintendent of the Pretoria Leper Asylum | |
| 14 March 1913 | Charles Henry Sargant | Justice of the High Court of Justice | |
| 21 April 1913 | Robert Turnbull, MVO | Superintendent of the London and NorthWestern Railway Line. On the occasion of Their Majesties' visit to Crewe Hall. | |
| 19 May 1913 | Henry Curtis Bennett | Chief Magistrate of the Police Courts of the Metropolis | |
| 2 June 1913 | James Richard Atkin | Justice of the High Court of Justice | |
| 11 June 1913 | Frederick William Black, CB | Director of Navy Contracts, Admiralty | |
| 11 June 1913 | Robert Bruce, CB | Controller of the London Postal Service | |
| 11 June 1913 | Thomas Milvain, CB | Judge Advocate-General | |
| 11 June 1913 | Maj. Edward Scott Worthington, MVO, RAMC | | |
| 11 June 1913 | Charles Carrick Allom | | |
| 11 June 1913 | John Harvard Biles, LLD | Professor of Naval Architecture at Glasgow University | |
| 11 June 1913 | Edward Hardman Bowers | Chief Inspector of Stamps and Taxes, Inland Revenue Department | |
| 11 June 1913 | Edward Bowron | | |
| 11 June 1913 | Edgar Chatfeild-Clarke | | |
| 11 June 1913 | Stephen Collins, MP | | |
| 11 June 1913 | Thomas Evans Flitcroft | | |
| 11 June 1913 | Johnston Forbes-Robertson | | |
| 11 June 1913 | Robert Eyes Fox | Town Clerk of Leeds | |
| 11 June 1913 | Philip Spencer Gregory | | |
| 11 June 1913 | Andrew John Home, FRCP(I) | | |
| 11 June 1913 | Robert Maule | | |
| 11 June 1913 | Edward Rosling | Unofficial Member of the Legislative Council, Ceylon | |
| 11 June 1913 | Edward Albert Schafer, FRS | Professor of Physiology, University of Edinburgh | |
| 11 June 1913 | Claud Schuster | | |
| 11 June 1913 | George Henry Fisher-Smith | | |
| 11 June 1913 | William Smith | | |
| 11 June 1913 | Joseph Weston Stevens | | |
| 11 June 1913 | Adolphus William Ward, LittD | | |
| 11 June 1913 | Robert Henry Woods, FRCS(I) | | |
| 11 June 1913 | John Dickinson | on his appointment as Chief Magistrate of the Police Courts of the Metropolis | |
| 11 June 1913 | The Hon. Richard Butler | Commissioner of Public Works, Minister of Mines and Minister of Marine of the State of South Australia | |
| 11 June 1913 | The Hon. Frederick Eustace Barker, DCL | the Chief Justice of the Supreme Court of New Brunswick | |
| 11 June 1913 | The Hon. Charles Peers Davidson, DCL | Chief Justice of the Superior Court of the Province of Quebec | |
| 11 June 1913 | The Hon. Hugh John Macdonald, KC | formerly Minister of the Interior of the Dominion of Canada | |
| 11 June 1913 | Alexander MacCormick, MD | | |
| 11 June 1913 | Edward Carlile, KC | formerly Parliamentary Draftsman, of the State of Victoria | |
| 11 June 1913 | Joseph Outerbridge | | |
| 11 June 1913 | Stephen Finney, CIE | Member of the Indian Railway Board | |
| 11 June 1913 | Fazulbhoy Currimbhoy Ibrahim | Additional Member of the Council of the Governor-General of India | |
| 11 June 1913 | Pramada Charan Banarji, BA, BL | a Puisne Judge of the High Court of Judicature, North-Western Provinces, India | |
| 11 June 1913 | Harry Lushington Stephen | a Puisne Judge of the High Court of Judicature at Fort William in Bengal | |
| 11 June 1913 | Lt-Col. James Reid Roberts, CIE | Indian Medical Service, Surgeon to the Viceroy | |
| 11 June 1913 | John David McClure, MA, LLD | | |
| 11 June 1913 | Herbert Smalley, MD | | |
| 7 July 1913 | William Scott Barrett, JP, DL | Chairman of Lancashire County Council. On the occasion of the King and Queen's visit to the county. | |
| 11 July 1913 | John Sutherland Harmwood-Banner, MP | Lord Mayor of Liverpool. On the occasion of the King and Queen's visit to Liverpool. | |
| 11 July 1913 | Helenus Robert Robertson | Chairman of the Mersey, Docks and Harbour Board. On the occasion of the King and Queen's visit to Liverpool. | |
| 14 July 1913 | Samuel Walter Royse | Lord Mayor of Manchester | |
| 12 August 1913 | John Meir Astbury | Justice of the High Court of Justice | |
| 13 October 1913 | Edward Ernest Cooper | Formerly Sheriff of the City of London | |
| 13 October 1913 | Alfred Louis Bower | Formerly Sheriff of the City of London | |
| 15 November 1913 | Charles Stewart Addis | Joint Manager of the Hongkong and Shanghai Bank | |
| 15 November 1913 | Stanley Owen Buckmaster, KC | On his appointment Solicitor-General | |
