= Jaykrishna Mukherjee =

Indian Bengali zamindar and social reformer (1808–1888)

Babu Jaykrishna Mukherjee
- জয়কৃষ্ণ মুখোপাধ্যায়
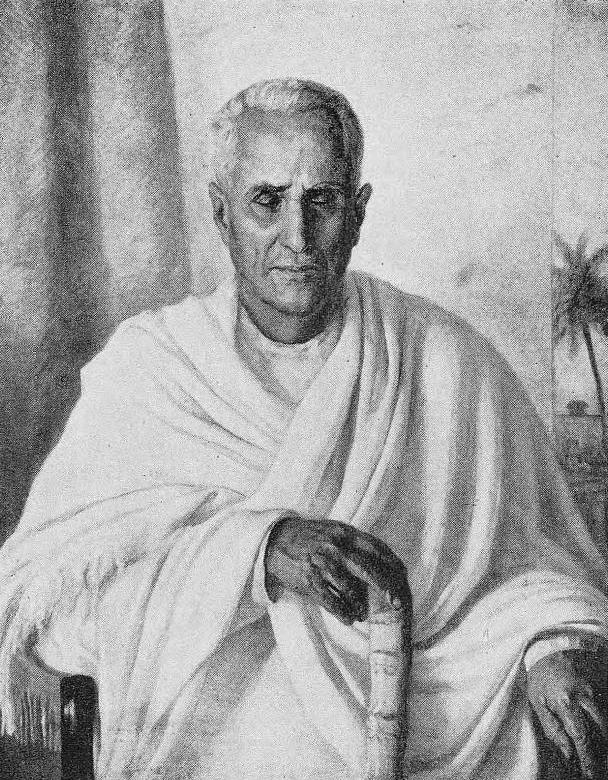
- Born: 24 August 1808; Uttarpara, British India (present day West Bengal, India)
- Died: 19 July 1888 (aged 79)
- Political party: All India National Congress
- Children: Peary Mohan Mukherjee
- Father: Jaganmohan Mukherjee

Jaykrishna Mukherjee (24 August 1808 – 19 July 1888) was an Indian Bengali zamindar and social reformer.

== Birth and early life ==
Mukherjee was born on 24 August 1808 in Uttarpara, Hooghly district (in present-day West Bengal, India), then part of British India, into the family of a clerk. He was the eldest of five children of Jaganmohan Mukherjee and his wife, Rajeshwari Devi. The others were Rajkrishna, Nabakrishna, Vijaykrishna and Naveenkrishna. After studying at Hindu School for some time in his childhood, Jaykrishna went to Meerut, where his father worked, at the age of eight. There he was admitted to the Regimental School. Towards the end of 1824, he joined the British army with his father during the invasion of the state of Bharatpur.

== Career ==
In 1830, he was appointed as the record keeper of the land revenue department of Hooghly and became the son-in-law of the Sabarna Roy Choudhury family by marriage. At that time, the zamindari estates were being sold one after another due to the damage caused by floods to the crops. Mukherjee gradually purchased these properties one by one, and in time his holdings became comparable to those of Dwarkanath Tagore. In 1835, he resigned from his job and established the zamindari of Uttarpara. In 1838, he became a member of the Zamindari Association founded by Dwarkanath Tagore.

== Contributions ==
Mukherjee, just as he established Uttarpara, Hooghly, in the world of education and culture, has also made significant contributions to many welfare works.

On 15 April 1852, Asia’s first free public library, now known as the Uttarpara Jaykrishna Public Library, was established through his initiative. In 1859, at a cost of ₹85,000, he constructed the library building on the banks of the Hooghly River, donated his personal collection of 3,000 books, magazines and other literary items, and bore all the initial expenses. This district library of Hooghly is regarded as a matter of pride for Bengalis and a historic institution. At the time, the library attracted visits from many eminent personalities. The notable visitors included Sri Aurobindo, Ishwar Chandra Vidyasagar, Abanindranath Tagore, Ramendra Sundar Tribedi, Reverend James Long, and Michael Madhusudan Dutt. Uttarpara Govt. High School and Uttarpara College (later Raja Peary Mohan College) were established with the initiative and help of Mukherjee. At that time, he was financially supporting a total of thirty-one schools. He donated ₹10,000 towards the establishment of Bethune College, the first women’s college in Calcutta, and ₹5,000 for setting up a library at the University of Calcutta. In 1851, he played a leading role in the formation of the Vernacular Literature Society in Calcutta. Among his public contributions was the establishment of charitable dispensaries and hospitals. After the cholera epidemic of 1851, the Uttarpara Municipality was formed in 1852 due to his enthusiasm and tireless work.

Zamindar Mukherjee was known for his benevolence. Alongside initiating agricultural reforms in his estate, he was also deeply active in social affairs. In recognition of the living conditions of Bengali peasants, he awarded Professor Lal Behari Dey of Hooghly College for his book Govinda Samanta: Or the History of a Bengali Raiyat. He was a prominent supporter of Ishwar Chandra Vidyasagar’s widow remarriage movement and was the first signatory to Vidyasagar’s petition. A liberal by nature, Mukherjee stood out as an exception in the otherwise conservative society of his time. The promotion of women’s education in Uttarpara began through his initiative. He was also one of the founders of the British Indian Association.

Mukherjee was a member of the Indian National Congress. In 1878, he protested against the British authorities' policy of free trade in favor of the British people. In 1886, he became the president of the reception committee at the second session of the Indian National Congress held in Calcutta and nominated Dadabhai Naoroji as the president of the Congress. Allan Octavian Hume described Mukherjee as the Nestor of Bengali conservatives.

== Death ==
Mukherjee died on 19 July 1888. In 1975, Dr. Neelmani Mukherjee authored a book on him titled A Bengali Zamindar, for which Nilmani Mukherjee received the Rabindra Puraskar in 1976.
