= Edward Rosling =

Sir Edward Rosling
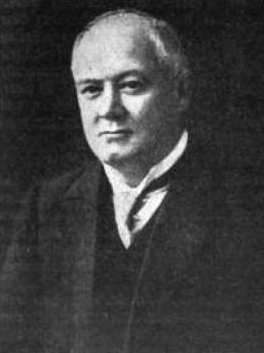
- Born: 4 December 1863; Barnes, Surrey, England
- Died: 19 January 1946 (aged 82); Weybridge, Surrey, England
- Education: Queenwood College
- Occupations: Planter, politician
- Spouse: Isabella Graham White (m. 1888)
- Children: seven

Sir Edward Rosling Knt. Bach., JP (4 December 1863 - 19 January 1946) was a Ceylonese tea planter and politician.

== Biography ==
Edward Rosling was born 4 December 1863 in Barnes, Surrey, England, the eldest son of Joseph Rosling (1830–1890), a timber merchant in Nutfield, and Julia Victoria née Black (1838–1927). He had two half siblings: Mary (b.1858) and Katherine (b. 1859) from his father's first marriage and three sisters: Margaret (b. 1866), Ethel (b. 1869) and Josephine (b. 1872) and one brother, Percy (b. 1867).

Rosling was educated at Queenwood College, Hampshire. In 1886, at the age of 23, he travelled to Ceylon, where he was apprenticed as a "creeper" (Note: A creeper was an individual who was apprenticed to an experienced manager to learn the business of tea planting.) on a tea plantation in Ambagamuwa before going home to get married, returning in late 1888 to take up a position as a manager on a tea estate in Nanu Oya. He worked as a tea planter for 27 years, serving as the chairman of the Anglo-Ceylon and General Estates Company Limited. In 1899 he was elected as the inaugural president of the Hill Club in Nuwara Eliya. In 1900 he was elected as the chairman of the Planter's Association, serving for a year, and was re-elected as chairman between 1909 and 1911. In November 1902 Rosling was appointed an unofficial member of the Legislative Council of Ceylon, and a Justice of the Peace. He served on the council for ten years until his retirement in 1913. His position on the council was subsequently filled by William Duff Gibbon.

He married Isabella Graham White (1866-1958) on 28 June 1888 at Duncairn Church in Belfast, Ireland. They had seven children: Josephine (b. 1890), Alfred (b. 1892), Edward (b. 1895), Isobel Phyllis (b. 1898), Percy Campbell (b. 1902), Edward (b. 1904) and Hugh Patrick (b. 1910).

Rosling was knighted in June 1913, for his services on the Legislative Council of Ceylon. Upon his retirement he returned to England becoming the chairman of the Ceylon Association in London between 1914 and 1915.

He died 19 January 1946 in Weybridge, Surrey, England. He is buried in the cemetery at St. Peter's church in Hersham, Surrey.
