= Crime scene investigation =

Crime scene investigation may refer to:

- Crime scene investigation, a part of forensic science
- CSI (franchise), an American television franchise
  - CSI: Crime Scene Investigation, an American television series
    - CSI: Crime Scene Investigation (video game), a 2003 video game based on the television series

== See also ==
- CSI (disambiguation)
