= List of knights bachelor appointed in 1912 =

Knight Bachelor is the oldest and lowest-ranking form of knighthood in the British honours system; it is the rank granted to a man who has been knighted by the monarch but not inducted as a member of one of the organised orders of chivalry. Women are not knighted; in practice, the equivalent award for a woman is appointment as Dame Commander of the Order of the British Empire (founded in 1917).

== Knights bachelor appointed in 1912 ==
Date	Name	Notes	Ref
1 January 1912	Edward Pigott William Redford, CB	Secretary to the General Post Office for Scotland	
1 January 1912	John Anderson	Unofficial Member of the Legislative Council, Straits Settlements, 1905–9	
1 January 1912	William Fletcher Barrett, FRS		
1 January 1912	Reuben Vincent Barrow		
1 January 1912	Joseph Beecham		
1 January 1912	Charles Behrens	Ex-Lord Mayor of Manchester	
1 January 1912	John Hawtrey Benson, MD	President of the Royal College of Physicians of Ireland	
1 January 1912	Thomas Henry Devereux Berridge		
1 January 1912	Valentine Chirol		
1 January 1912	Robert John Collie, MD, CM	Medical Examiner to the London County Council	
1 January 1912	James Mackenzie Davidson, MB, CM		
1 January 1912	William Duff Gibbon	Acted as Unofficial Member of the Legislative Council of Ceylon "on several occasions"	
1 January 1912	Henry Rider Haggard		
1 January 1912	Thomas Henry Hepburn		
1 January 1912	Henry Jones, LLD, DLitt	Professor of Moral Philosophy in the University of Glasgow	
1 January 1912	Samuel Robert Keightley, LLD		
1 January 1912	Alfred Bray Kempe, DCL, FRS		
1 January 1912	Henry Alexander Miers, DSc, FRS	Principal of the University of London	
1 January 1912	Herbert James Francis Parsons		
1 January 1912	Sidney Job Pocock		
1 January 1912	Alexander Porter		
1 January 1912	George Henry Savage, MD, FRCP		
1 January 1912	Courtauld Thomson		
1 January 1912	William Wilkins Vincent		
1 January 1912	John Tudor Walters, MP		
1 January 1912	Robert Walton	Chairman of the British Chamber of Commerce in Paris	
1 January 1912	Frederick Wedmore		
1 January 1912	Bertram Coghill Alan Windle, LLD, FRS, FSA	President of University College, Cork	
1 January 1912	Edward Burnett Tylor, DCL, LLD, FRS	Emeritus Professor of Anthropology in the University of Oxford	
1 January 1912	Anthony Michael Coll	Chief Justice of Jamaica	
1 January 1912	The Hon. Charles Kinnaird Mackellar	Member of the Legislative Council of the State of New South Wales and President of the State Children's Relief Board	
1 January 1912	Edmund Boyd Osler	Member of the House of Commons of the Dominion of Canada	
1 January 1912	Rodolphe Forget	Member of the House of Commons of the Dominion of Canada	
1 January 1912	Charles Henry Goode		
4 January 1912	Frederick Loch Halliday, CIE, MVO		
4 January 1912	David Yule		
26 January 1912	Vincenzo Frendo Azopardi, CMG, LLD	Crown Advocate in Malta. Appointed during the King's visit to the island.	
6 March 1912	William Maurice Abbot-Anderson, MVO	Surgeon to the Princess Royal and Household	
9 March 1912	Edward White	Chairman of the London County Council. On the occasion of the laying of the foundation stone of the new London County Hall.	
9 March 1912	Maurice Fitzmaurice, CMG	Chief Engineer to the London County Council. On the occasion of the laying of the foundation stone of the new London County Hall.	
11 March 1912	Ho Kai, CMG	Unofficial Member of the Legislative Council of the Colony of Hong Kong. On the occasion of the opening of the University of Hong Kong.	
28 May 1912	Harry James Veitch		
14 June 1912	John Edward Power Wallis	A Puisne Judge of the High Court of Judicature at Fort St. George, Madras	
14 June 1912	John Page Middleton	A Puisne Judge of the Supreme Court of the Island of Ceylon, Ceylon	
14 June 1912	Laurence Charles Edward Downing Dowdall, CB	Principal Clerk, Chief Secretary's Office, Ireland	
14 June 1912	Charles Albert King, CB	Comptroller and Accountant-General, General Post Office	
14 June 1912	Lt-Col. David Prain, CIE, FRS	Director of the Royal Botanical Gardens, Kew	
14 June 1912	Francis Sowerby Bennett		
14 June 1912	Edward Tyas Cook		
14 June 1912	Frederick Green	Director of the Orient Steam Navigation Company and the Suez Canal Company	
14 June 1912	William Stowell Haldane	Crown Agent for Scotland	
14 June 1912	Norval Watson Helme, MP		
14 June 1912	George Thompson Hutchinson, FRGS	Chairman of Hursfa and Blackett (Limited)	
14 June 1912	Malachi Kelly	Chief Crown Solicitor for Ireland	
14 June 1912	John Mills McCallum, MP		
14 June 1912	Henry John Manton		
14 June 1912	Berkeley George Andrew Moynihan, FRCS	Professor of Clinical Surgery, University of Leeds	
14 June 1912	George Paish		
14 June 1912	Edward Partington	Director of the Manchester and Liverpool District Bank	
14 June 1912	William Barclay Peat		
14 June 1912	George Pragnell		
14 June 1912	William Pick Raynor		
14 June 1912	Charles Hercules Read	President of the Society of Antiquaries; Keeper of British and Mediaeval Antiquities in the British Museum	
14 June 1912	John Bland-Sutton, FRCS		
14 June 1912	Abraham Garrod Thomas, MD		
14 June 1912	St Clair Thomson, MD		
14 June 1912	Charles Waldstein, DLitt		
14 June 1912	Whitworth Wallis, FSA	Director of the Birmingham Art Gallery	
14 June 1912	Joseph Dubuc, LLD, BCL	Formerly Chief Justice of the Court of King's Bench for the Province of Manitoba	
14 June 1912	The Hon. John James Duncan	Member of the Legislative Council of the State of South Australia	
14 June 1912	Jan Willem Stuckeris Langerman	Member of the House of Assembly, Union of South Africa	
14 June 1912	Reginald Sothern Holland		
14 June 1912	Jagmohandas Varjivandas	Justice of the Peace, Bombay	
14 June 1912	Chettur Sankaran Nair, CIE	A Puisne Judge of the High Court of Judicature at Fort St. George, Madras	
14 June 1912	Campbell Kirkman Finlay		
25 June 1912	John Wesley Courtis	Lord Mayor of the City of Cardiff	
28 June 1912	Frank William Wills	Lord Mayor of the City of Bristol	
22 July 1912	Sam Fay	General manager of the Great Central Railway Company. On the occasion of the opening of the new Dock at Immingham.	
25 July 1912	Francis Fox	Member of the Institution of Civil Engineers	
10 October 1912	Sidney Arthur Taylor Rowlatt	Justice of the High Court of Justice	
18 November 1912	Clement Meacher Bailhache	Justice of the High Court of Justice	
