= Uttarpara Public Library =

Library in Uttarpara, India

Uttarpara Jaykrishna Public Library
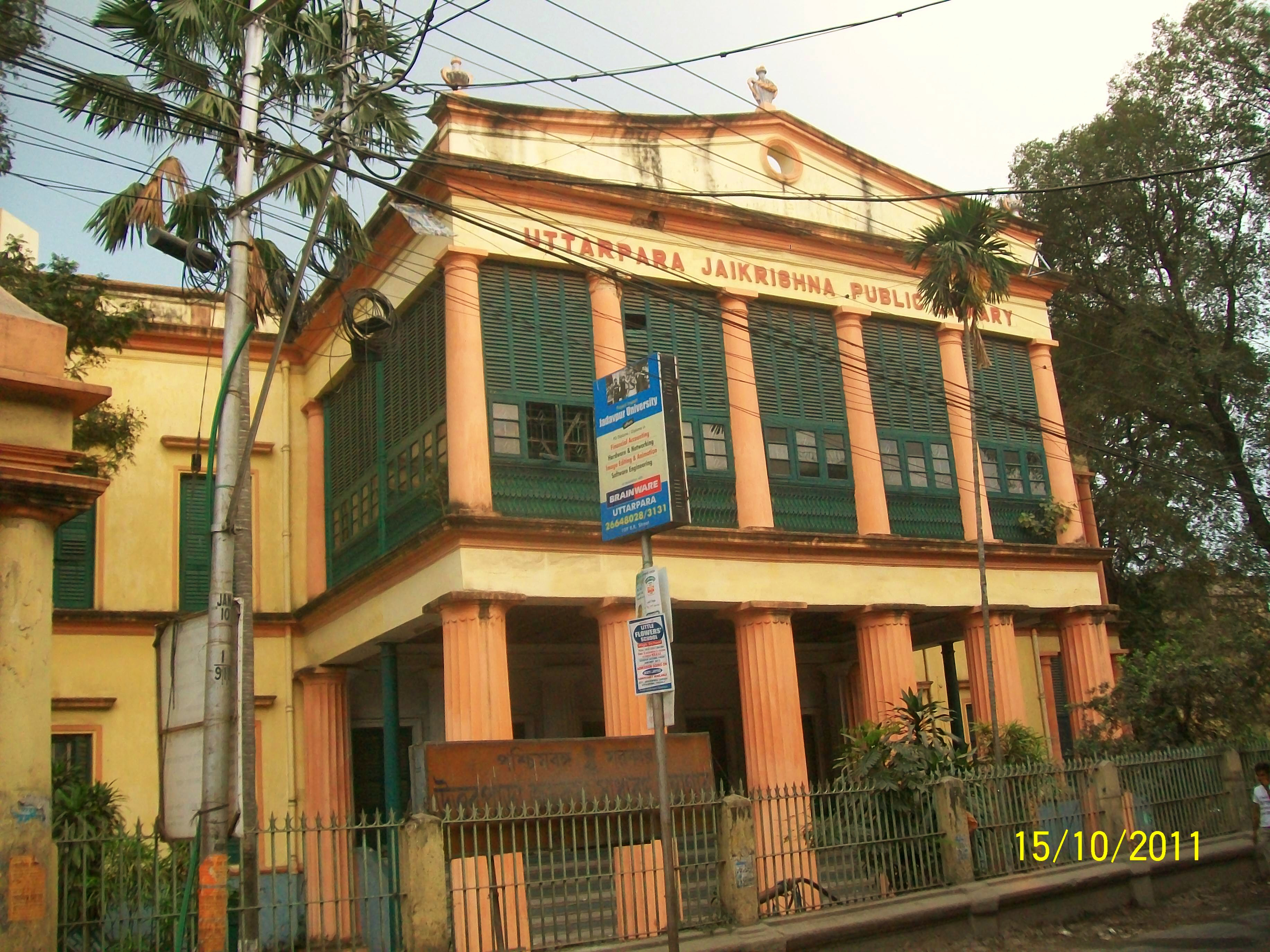
- Uttarpara Library
- 22.6615989°N 88.3476703°E
- Location: 229, Grand Trunk Road, P.O. Uttarpara, Hooghly District, West Bengal, India
- Type: Public
- Established: 15 April 1859; 166 years ago

Uttarpara Jaykrishna Public Library is a district library in Uttarpara, West Bengal, India, and is the first of its kind in Asia. Located in Uttarpara, a small town on the banks of the Hoogly river, this library was established by Babu Jaykrishna Mukherjee and opened to the public in 1859. At present, the library has been declared a Group ‘A’ Library by the West Bengal State Government. Efforts are being made to have it declared an Institution of National Importance.

== History ==
=== Sri Jayakrishna Mukherjee ===
The Uttarpara Jaykrishna Public Library was founded by Jaykrishna Mukherjee, a prominent Bengali landlord (zamindar) and social reformer. Born in 1808 in Uttarpara, Jaykrishna was the son of a clerk and businessman, Jagan Mohun Mukherjee. He travelled with Jagan Mohun to Meerut at the age of 8, and was enrolled in a regimental school there. In the latter part of 1824, he participated with his father in the campaign against Bharatpur. In 1830, he became a record-keeper in the office of the Collector of Land Revenue at Hooghly. During this time, several estates were put up for sale due to the agricultural depression caused by severe flooding. Jaykrishna Mukherjee bought these estates, notably those of the Singur Babus. With time, and further acquisition, Jaykrishna Mukherjee's reputation as a prominent landholder began to equal that of Dwarkanath Tagore. In fact, in 1838, when Dwarkanath established the Landholders' Society, Jaykrishna was elected as a member.

An ardent social reformer and nationalist, Jaykrishna Mukherjee spearheaded the effort to establish a municipality in Uttarpara after the 1851 cholera epidemic there. As a result of his efforts, the Uttarpara Municipality was formed in the latter part of 1851. Jaykrishna also established many schools in Uttarpara, for both boys and girls, and the Uttarpara College. He donated Rs. 10,000 towards the establishment of the Bethune College (founded by the Honorable Drinkwater Bethune) and Rs. 5000 towards the Calcutta University Library. Apart from conducting very many agricultural reforms, he was also socio-politically active. He was the first signatory of Ishwarchandra Vidyasagar’s memorial for legalizing widow marriage. He was a member of the Indian National Congress; his speech proposing Dadabhai Naoroji as president of the Second Indian National Congress (held in Calcutta in 1886) was much acclaimed. This is indicated by Mr. A. O. Hume describing Jaykrishna as "the Nestor of the Bengal conservatives".

=== The Library ===
On 15 April 1859, Jaykrishna Mukherjee formally opened the first free Public Library in India (and perhaps in Asia as well). This library, known as the Uttarpara Public Library, was originally Jaykrishna's personal collection and open to researchers as early as 1851. Influenced by Dwarkanath Tagore and in light of the Public Libraries Act 1850 (in Britain), Jaykrishna wanted to do something to spread public education and increase scholarship in Bengal. In the August 1854, he submitted a proposal, for a public library at Uttarpara, to the Divisional Commissioner of Burdwan. He was willing to donate Rs. 5000 towards this. The proposal failed, and Jaykrishna went ahead and funded the entire library by himself. The library building, a palatial construction by the side of the Hooghly, started being constructed in 1856. The land area was one acre and the entire construction cost him Rs. 85000. The staff appointed was initially 7 people: a librarian, an assistant librarian, a clerk, two gardeners, one sweeper, and one durwan. He also appointed a group of Uttarpara citizens as curators of the library. To them he "has made over a landed estate yielding Rs. 1800 a year; but as more works of English and Sanscrit [were] yet to be added, he [had] made a separate provision for the same."

Initially, the library held around 3000 books and many periodicals: all from Jaykrishna's private collection. He procured more books and periodicals from diverse sources: he bought them from the fund of the charitable Devottara trust formed by his father, bought rare collections from the Bengal Harkara Library, and he also bought books from the sellers at China Bazar. By 1865, the library had 12000 books in English and 2500 books in Bengali and Sanskrit. As of now, the library has 45000 old and rare books (most of them from the 17th to the 19th century); 65000 new books (both Bengali and English); 2500 old periodicals; 20000 new (and bound) periodicals; and 450 manuscripts. As Sir William Hunter had said, it is "a unique storehouse of local literature alike in English and vernacular tongues."

The library contains some old and rare volumes of periodicals in both Bengali and English: Dig Darshan, Sangbad Rasaraj, Somprakash, Tatvabodhini, Calcutta Monthly Journal, and Bengal Chronicle to name just a few. Apart from containing the early 19th century publications of pioneers such as William Carey, Marshman, Ward, Halhade, Rammohan, etc.; the library also contains The Holy Bible in Sanskrit, Dictionary of Chemistry, Sanskrit Grammar in Devnagri and Roman Letters by Max Muller, Reports at Westminster London (1658), Parliamentary Reports (1649), Charters of the East India Company, East India Pamphlets (1812), Reports on Public Instruction (1839), etc. Other documents include "Wellington’s dispatches, State Secret Papers, British Review, American Quarterly Review, Edinbourough Review, Travelogues, Dictionaries, Memoirs, Topographical and Geographical Accounts, Annecdotes, Almanacs, Law Reports, Gazetteers, and many more." All this aside from the 200 Sanskrit palm-leaf, plantain-leaf, and handmade paper manuscripts collected from Benaras, Kashmir, and the monasteries of Tibet. Most of the titles included in the Descriptive Catalogue of Vernacular Books and Pamphlets by Rev. James Long are from this library. Also available are Rammohan Roy's Gaudiya Vyakaran, Mrittyunjoy Vidyalankar's Rajabali, Madhusudhan's Hectorbadh Kavya, Baidyanath Acharya's Agyan Timir Nahak, Nrisinghadeb Ghosal's Visvagyan O Brahmagyan, Brajendralal Vidyalankar's Udvidvidya, Kalipada Mukhoadhyay's Rasasindhu Premavilas, Pramanthanath Sharma's Nabababu Bilas, Upendralal Mitra's Bastu Parichay, and Gadhadhar Bhattacharya's Shathik Muktibad.

=== Famous Visitors ===
Rather than being merely a library, the Uttarpara Jaykrishna Public Library was also a place where intellectuals met, and carried out their studies in peace while residing there. In 1866, Ishwarchandra Vidyasagar came to visit the library with the noted educationist Mary Carpenter. Consequently, in her book "Six months in India", Miss Carpenter spends a not insignificant amount of space speaking about the library. She informs us that "the lower storey of the building contains the library, and the upper rooms are reserved to accommodate respectable visitors, as well as to hold public meetings …." The list of these "respectable visitors" includes the names of stalwarts like Michael Madhusudan Dutta (who stayed there with his family for 2 months in 1869 and then, again, in 1873); Sir. William Wilson Hunter; John H. S. Cunningham; Rev. James Long; Sir Arthur Wellesley; Sir Ashley Eden; Sir Edwin Arnold; Sir Rivers Thompson; Marquis of Dufferin and Ava Dufferin; Surendranath Banerjee; Keshab Chandra Sen; Bipin Pal; and Swami Vivekananda. On 30 May 1909, Sri Aurobindo gave his famous ‘Uttarpara Speech’ on the grounds of the Library.

=== Situation Post 1888 ===
It was Jaykrishna's desire that the library would be managed by a board of curators after his demise. He expired in 1888, and the library was involved in a series of financial problems and litigations. This magnificent building and its remarkable collection suffered from a lack of care and maintenance. In 1911, the Library management Trust tried to get the institution assigned with the Treasurer of Charitable Institutions, but were unsuccessful. The attempt was repeated in 1953, but this was unsuccessful as well. Earlier, in 1949 and 1951, the board of curators had made proposals to the Government for a take-over of the Library. With no help in sight, the people of Uttarpara, especially the youngsters, tried to rescue this heritage institution. Organizations like Sri Madhusudan Sahitya Sangha and Uttarpara Sammilani (founded by Sri Amendra Nath Chattopadhyay) worked with the board of curators to bring the library to the government's notice. In 1954, Dr. Bidhan Chandra Roy, the then Chief Minister of West Bengal, paid the library a visit and gave an assurance that he would do the needful. Although reform proposals were drafted and forwarded to the Chief Minister in June and, later November, 1955 there was no substantial change in the situation until 1958. In April 1958, the library was awarded the status of an ‘Area Library’ (a partial fulfilment of the take-over demand) with the sanction of Rs. 64000 as an annual maintenance grant. There was a further deputation by the board of curators to the then chief minister Sri Prafulla Chandra Sen in 1963. As a result, on 8 May 1963, the library building came to be requisitioned by the government. At last, on 15 June 1964, the Uttarpara Public Library was taken over by the Government of West Bengal as a District Library by invoking the charitable Endowment Act of 1890. However, the library has not yet been declared an institute of national importance and, although it is helped financially by the state government (through annual grants and special grants from time to time), the library is in need of further modernization and financial help.

Pratibha Patil, the 12th president of India, participated in the 150th year celebration of the library. Apart from forwarding the request for support to the Ministry of Culture of the Government of India, Smt. Patil also donated rupees 10 lakh towards the preservation of books in the library.
