= Uttarpara Govt. High School =

Coordinates: 22.65574°N 88.34870°E

Uttarpara Government High School
- 6–7, Achariya Dhruba Paul Road, G.T. Road; Uttarpara, Hooghly, Serampore; West Bengal 712258

Information
- Type: Public school
- Established: 16 May 1846; 180 years ago
- Campus: Urban
- Affiliation: WBBSE & WBCHSE
- Website: www.uttarparagovtschool-esa.org

Uttarpara Government High School also known as Uttarpara Rastriya Uchcha Vidyalaya (উত্তরপাড়া রাষ্ট্রীয় উচ্চ বিদ্যালয়) is a school situated in Uttarpara, a town near Serampore City in Hooghly District, West Bengal, India. It was established on the western bank of river Hooghly by Babu Jay Krishna Mukhopadhyay and Babu Raj Krishna Mukhopadhyay on 16 May 1846. The school is directly under the Government of West Bengal.

== Alumni ==
- Biman Bagchi, Theoretical Chemist at Indian Institute of Science.
- Abhas Mitra, Theoretical Astrophysicist, Bhabha Atomic Research Center.
- Kinshuk Dasgupta, Material Scientist, Bhabha Atomic Research Centre.
- Arindam Khan, Theoretical Computer Scientist, Indian Institute of Science.
- Soumya Kundu, Staff Research Engineer, Control Theory, Pacific Northwest National Laboratory, United States Department of Energy.
- Anirban Kundu, Theoretical Physicist, Presidency University, Kolkata.
- Sujoy Parui, former cricketer.
