= William Duff Gibbon =

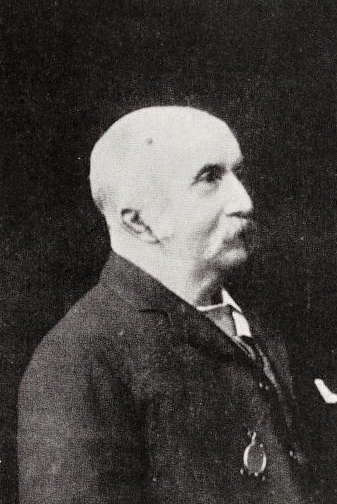

Sir William Duff Gibbon (18 July 1837 – 19 March 1919) was a British Ceylonese tea planter and politician.

== Biography ==
William Duff Gibbon was born 18 July 1837 in Aberdeen, Scotland, the youngest of nine children to Rev. Charles Gibbon (1789–1871), the minister at Lonmay, and Ann née Duff (1787-1867). He received his education at Banff Academy and Aberdeen Grammar School from 1848-1851, before studying at Marischal College and then at the University of Aberdeen. In 1855, at the age of eighteen, he left Scotland to grow coffee in Ceylon under the tutelage of his brother-in-law, Robert Boyd Tytler, Tytler married Gibbon's older sister, Annie Grace (1830-1904). He commenced his planting career on the Madulkelle estate in the Kelebokka district. He then took over the management of the Oonoonagalla estate followed by the Madulkelle estate. In 1858 he took charge of the 323 ha (800 acres) Hoolankanda estate.

In 1863 Gibbon returned to Scotland, where on 15 September, he married Katherine Murray (1842–1916), the daughter of Andrew Murray, an advocate in Aberdeen. They had six children: James, a successful banker in Germany; John Murray (1875-1952), a Canadian author; Jessie Eyre Duff (1877-1955) who married Colonel Douglas Edward Cayley; and youngest son, William Duff (1880-1955), who served as Lieutenant Colonel in the Worcestershire Regiment, was severely wounded in the battle of Sari Bair and went on to serve as the headmaster of Campbell College.

Gibbon was elected to the Kandy Municipal Council for a number of years and was a fellow of the Royal Colonial Institute. In May 1907 he was appointed as an unofficial member of the Legislative Council of Ceylon, replacing Edward Rosling.

Gibbon was a tea-planter and was knighted in March 1912 for his 56 years developing the tea industry in Ceylon and for his services on the Legislative Council of Ceylon. He also served as the Chairman of the Planters' Association of Ceylon in 1878 and was the organisation's first life member.

He retired to England c.1911 and died on 19 March 1919 at Hathaway Cottage, Bournemouth, Hampshire at the age of 81. Gibbon was buried at the family plot in the Lonmay churchyard, Aberdeenshire, Scotland.
