= Raja Peary Mohan College =

Educational institution in India

- Type: Government
- Established: 20 June 1887; 139 years ago
- Academic affiliations: University of Calcutta
- Principal: Dr. Sudip Kumar Chakrabarty
- Location: 1, Acharya Dhruba Pal Road, Kotrung, Uttarpara, West Bengal, India; 22°39′21″N 88°20′57″E
- Campus: Urban
- Website: RPMCollege.edu.in
- Location within West Bengal Location within India

Raja Peary Mohan College is a general and honours degree purpose college in Hooghly District of West Bengal, India under the University of Calcutta. It offers undergraduate level courses in various arts, commerce and science subjects. The college is a popular institution for undergraduate study in the neighborhood of Uttarpara, the Hooghly district, Howrah and the North 24 Parganas.

== History ==
The college was established in 1881 by late Raja Joy Krishna Mukherjee (who was the father of Raja Peary Mohan Mukherjee), a leading social reformer and educationist of colonial Bengal, when it was under the British rule. The college was transferred the government aided list to the unaided list in 1887. Raja Peary Mohan Mukherjee took over management of the college after the death of his father. On 21 August 1938, Prime Minister of Bengal A. K. Fazlul Huq and Finance Minister Nalini Ranjan Sarkar visited the college. On 4 October 1953 it was renamed after Raja Peary Mohan Mukherjee.

On 16 December 1967, police attack on protesting students and teachers, part of the Naxalite movement era in West Bengal, at the college led to the injury of 18 teachers including the vice-principal.

== Departments and courses ==
The college offers different undergraduate and postgraduate courses and aims at imparting education to the undergraduates of lower- and middle-class people of Uttarpara and its adjoining areas.

=== Science ===
Science faculty consists of the departments of Chemistry, Physics, Mathematics, Computer Science & Application, Botany, Zoology, Physiology, and Economics.

=== Arts & Commerce ===
Arts and Commerce faculty consists of departments: Bengali, English, Sanskrit, History, Political Science, Philosophy, Education, and Commerce.

=== Science ===
Mathematics, physics, chemistry, phsyiology, zoology and computer science.

== See also ==
- List of colleges affiliated to the University of Calcutta
- Education in India
- Education in West Bengal
