= Carnaby Street (radio programme) =

Saturday morning UK radio programme

- Genre: 1960s Music
- Running time: 2 hours
- Country of origin: Isle of Man
- Language: English
- Home station: Manx Radio
- Hosted by: Chris Williams
- Created by: Chris Williams
- Produced by: Blackpool Bullet Production for Chris Williams Entertainments
- Recording studio: Studio 1, Manx Radio, Douglas, Isle of Man
- Original release: 2005
- Audio format: 1368 kHz AM, 89.0 MHz FM, 97.2 MHz FM, 103.7 MHz FM. Online
- Opening theme: Crunchy Granola Suite
- Ending theme: Crunchy Granola Suite
- Website: http://www.manxradio.com/on-air/carnaby-street/carnaby-street/

Carnaby Street, also referred to as Carnaby Street International (CSI), is a radio programme broadcast on Manx Radio on Saturday mornings and features music from the 1960s.

Presented by Chris Williams, the show formally comprised music and news from two chosen years with a general mix of 1960s music covering the transmission of the last Saturday of the month in addition to the monthly Radio Caroline North broadcast, of which the show forms part. However from the winter of 2025 CSI features a sundry 1960s mix as the playlist, augmented by a Listener's Top Three.

The programme is sponsored by the Isle of Man Railways and produced by Chris Williams Entertainments.

Carnaby Street is broadcast throughout the Isle of Man on FM and MW frequencies. In addition the transmission covers North West England, North Wales, Southwest Scotland and Northeastern parts of Ireland on 1368 kHz AM (219 metres medium wave). It is also broadcast worldwide through the Manx Radio website.

The title of the show is taken from Carnaby Street, seen by many as the epi-centre of Swinging London in the 1960s.

The show commences at the conclusion of the 8:00am news bulletin and begins with the playing the show's theme tune, Crunchy Granola Suite by Percy Faith & His Orchestra. Williams then gives a brief outline of the chosen years of that week's show, together with the artists which will be featured, and concludes his introduction with the phrase; "Let's get on with it!"

== Show format ==
Until the winter of 2025, the show's format was usually that of a contemporary presentation in the two chosen years. Williams, with the assistance of his "co-presenters" Gladys or Doris, the Tea Lady, Harry the Engine Driver and Roger the Fireman, would take the listener on board the Isle of Man Railways time train, whereupon they were transported back to the chosen year. Music from the particular year was played together with Williams reporting contemporary news items which were spoken about in the context of the present tense.

The format would differ on the last Saturday of each month when the show comprised a general playlist of 60s music with no specific years featured.

Carnaby Street leans heavily on the kind of presentation common on Radio Caroline, making reference to that station's strong links to the Isle of Man. Radio jingles and competitions which would have been familiar to listeners of Radio Caroline in the 1960s are common throughout the transmission. However if the chosen year is pre-1964 (i.e. prior to the commencement of Radio Caroline broadcasts), jingles from Radio Luxembourg are used instead. Certain Radio London jingles also feature, and the show is very much geared to giving the feeling of a pirate radio broadcast in the spirit and style of Caroline and The Big L.

Numerous competitions from the programme's sponsors are also featured with various prizes offered.

The music covers a broad spectrum by well-known 60s artists, and the playlist also includes three; million selling records from both of the featured years.During the winter of 2025 a Listener's Top Three was introduced with the programme's listeners invited to email the show with their favourite three 1960s tracks.

The manner of the presentation and tempo of the show is upbeat and vibrant, being referred to by Williams as: "the biggest little 60's show on the radio." Often heard would be quips by Doris, and now Gladys, which invariably take the form of double entendre.

The show generally ends with Williams reviewing some aspects of the show whilst Crunchy Granola Suite plays in the background. The edition is then available on the Manx Radio website to be listened to again for the following seven days.

From 2017 Carnaby Street was also repeated in the early hours of Monday mornings as part of Manx Radio's overnight service. However as of the beginning of 2019 following a reappraisal of the overnight schedule the repeat transmission was discontinued with.

Whilst Manx Radio is a commercial radio station, advertising content on the show is from the show's sponsor only. However, contemporary radio adverts are also played in order to re-create the flavour of radio broadcasting in the 1960s.

=== Radio Caroline Link up ===
In November 2014, as part of the 50th birthday celebrations of Radio Caroline, Manx Radio joined with Radio Caroline for an anniversary link up, part of which included Williams hosting a special transmission of Carnaby Street from onboard Caroline's floating base, the MV Ross Revenge, moored on the River Blackwater, Essex.

This association has seen further broadcasts of Carnaby Street from the Ross Revenge and in turn has subsequently lead to numerous collaborations between Manx Radio and Radio Caroline.

==== Marine Offences Act Commemorative Broadcast ====
To mark 50th anniversary of the passing into law of the Marine Broadcasting Offences Act 1967, Carnaby Street broadcast live from Radio Caroline on Saturday 12 August 2017. This was part of a wider Radio Caroline commemorative weekend with an exhibition at Royal Theatre, Clacton-on-Sea, in addition to which Williams broadcast his Manx Radio Breakfast Show from Caroline's studio on board the MV Ross Revenge on Monday 14 August, to mark fifty years to the day when the act came into law.

== History ==
The programme can trace its lineage to the 1970s with its genesis in previous Manx Radio programmes of a similar genre such as The Golden Oldies Show which was presented by Stu Lowe. Following Lowe's departure from Manx Radio, Andy Wint took over the presentation of the station's traditional 60s music slot, and subsequently set about enhancing the presentation style and the show's format, providing a more professional tone to the production. In 2005 the Carnaby Street concept was introduced by Williams resulting in the show's current make up.

== Guest presenters ==
In May 2015 Chris Williams had to temporarily stand down from presenting Carnaby Street following a bout of illness, with Simon Clarke deputising. Following a period of convalescence, Williams returned to present the show on 27 June.

The programme was presented by Bob Harrison on 21 March 2020 as a consequence of Williams undergoing a period of self isolation during the COVID-19 pandemic. Still observing his period of self isolation Williams was however able to resume presenting the show on March 28, when he undertook the presentation from his home in Peel.

Williams was again absent from 14 November 2020 while he recuperated from an operation, with Chris Pearson deputising as programme presenter.

Following a "supposed disagreement" with Chris Pearson, Doris the left the show to be replaced in her role of tea lady by Gladys, who made her debut on Saturday February 27, 2021. Doris returned the programme but subsequently "ran off with the Milkman," and was replaced this time by Ethel the Tea Lady who made her debut on the progrmme on Saturday July 25, 2026.
