= Cité Scolaire Internationale de Lyon =

International school in Lyon, France

Coordinates: 45.7278°N 4.8213°E

- Lyon; France

Information
- Enrollment: 1900

The Cité Scolaire Internationale de Lyon (French pronunciation: [site skɔlɛːʁ ɛ̃tɛʁnɑsjɔnal də ljɔ̃]; CSI), also known as the Lycée International de Lyon or Lycée de Gerland, is an international school located near the confluence of the Rhône and the Saône in the city of Lyon, France. It provides education combining regular French classes with classes in the second language of the student. The international sections include English, Italian, Spanish, Polish, German, Portuguese, Chinese, Arabic and Japanese. The classes are taught from primary level all the way up to the high school diploma, the Baccalauréat, which is available with the International Option (BFI, or "Baccalauréat Français International").

There are 1900 students in the school, from primary to high school; over 40 nationalities are represented.

As in all French lycées, students in the last two years ("première" and "terminale") can choose between an array of different specialised subjects (Spécialité). The CSI offers the following subjects: Maths, Chemistry/Physics, Ancient Languages, SVT (Sciences et Vie de le Terre), Geography/History/Political Science (HGGSP), Humanities/Literature/Philosophy (HLP), Advanced English (LLCE), Computer Science (NSI), Economics and Social Sciences (SES)

International students are also able to prepare for the BFI, and take classes in literature, history and geography (or maths)in their second language.

The school constantly rates top in the region, i.e. in 2005, 97% of the graduating students received their baccalaureate, whereas the "2004-2005 success rate for the baccalauréat in mainland France was 79.7%" (see baccalauréat article).

The building is located on the Rhône riverside, and is a novelty in terms of architecture. After 15 years of hardship with the famous skyroof, a brand new one has been set in as of September 2007.

== Programmes ==
The school includes the Section Japonaise (リヨン・ジェルラン補習授業校 Riyon Jeruran Hoshū Jugyō Kō "Lyon Gerland Japanese Supplementary School"), which the Japanese Ministry of Education, Culture, Sports, Science and Technology (MEXT) counts as a part-time Japanese supplementary school.

== Alumni ==
- Rima Abdul Malak, minister of Culture of France
