= Commission for Railway Regulation =

The Commission for Railway Regulation (CRR) (Irish: An Coimisiún um Rialáil Iarnróid, CRI), formerly the Railway Safety Commission (RSC) (Irish: Coimisiún Sábháilteachta Iarnróid, CSI) is the regulator for Irish rail networks. It is an agency of the Republic of Ireland government, and its head office is in Temple House in Blackrock.

The agency was established on 1 January 2006 as part of the Railway Safety Act 2005.

The Railway Accident Investigation Unit (RAIU), a functionally independent unit of the CRR, investigates accidents and incidents on Irish railways.

The RSC became the Commission for Railway Regulation (CRR) on 29 February 2016 following its designation as a regulatory body under EU law.
