= Pramada Charan Banerjee =

Bengali Indian jurist

Justice Sir Pramada Charan Banerjee
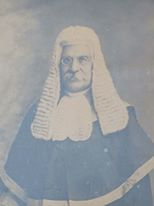

Justice, Allahabad High Court

Personal details
- Born: 10 April 1848
- Died: 22 March 1930 (aged 81) Allahabad, Uttar Pradesh
- Education: Graduation, LL.B

Sir Pramada Charan Banerjee (Note: also transliterated as Pramoda Churn Banerji, Bannerji, Bannerjee, Banarji, or Banarjee) (10 April 1848 – 22 March 1930) was a Bengali Indian jurist of the British Raj era in the Allahabad High Court and also Vice-Chancellor of the University of Allahabad.

== Biography ==
Banerjee was born on 10 April 1848. He lived in Uttarpara and attended Presidency College, Calcutta and the University of Calcutta, from which he respectively obtained B.A. and B.L. degrees. He practised at the Bar in Bankipore until moving to Allahabad in 1870.

== Life ==
Banerjee first entered the judiciary of India in January 1872 as a munsif, working at Allahabad, Benares and Ghazipore. He was appointed a subordinate judge in 1880, working first in the Small Causes Courts of Agra, where he was the first Indian judge, and then at Allahabad. He held a brief appointment as an additional civil judge at Lucknow in 1893 before becoming a puisne judge for the North-Western Provinces at Allahabad High Court in December of that year. He remained in that office until August 1923, when he was replaced by Kanhaiya Lal prior to retiring from the bench in March 1924.

Banerjee was the second Indian to be appointed a judge at the Allahabad High Court, the first being Syed Mahmood, (Note: Between 1876 and 1910 there were 29 judges who sat in the Allahabad High Court, of which 25 were British. Two of the remainder, including Mahmood, were Muslims whose opinions were rarely accepted by the full bench.) whom Banerjee succeeded. With Mahmood, Chief Justice John Edge and others, he "made indelible imprints greatness as Judges on the pages of [Allahabad High Court’s] law reports".

Appointed a Knight Bachelor in the 1913 Birthday Honours, Banerjee was a member of the law faculty at the University of Allahabad and was Vice-Chancellor of the university from 1917 to 1919, in which year the university conferred on him the degree of Doctor of Laws, honoris causa; later, it also established the P. C. Banerjee Hostel in honour of him. In 1921, he was awarded the Kaisar-i-Hind Medal, first class, by George V in recognition of his public service.

Banerjee died at the age of 82. Among his children was Lalit Mohan Banerjee, who also served as a judge in the Allahabad High Court.

== Recognition ==
Allahabad University established the Sir Pramada Charan Banerjee hostel in 1915 in his honour.
