= City Supermarket, Inc. =

Retail industry in Northern Luzon, Philippines

CSI Malls (City Supermarket, Incorporated.)
- Type: Private
- Industry: Retail, Wholesale
- Headquarters: Lucao, Dagupan, Philippines
- Number of locations: 3 shopping malls 18 retails
- Area served: Pangasinan; La Union; Ilocos Sur; Zambales
- Key people: Belen Fernandez (Chairwoman, President and CEO); Josephine Fernandez-Seen (Vice Chairman and COO)
- Subsidiaries: CSI Supermarket, Inc.; CSI Department Store, Inc.; CSI Best Home Furniture, Inc.; CSI Houseware and Appliance Store, Inc.; USATV, Inc. (Subsidiary of CSI Warehouse Club, Inc.)
- Website: csimalls.com csistore.ph

CSI Malls (City Supermarket, Inc.) is a retailer under the CSI Group of Companies based in Dagupan, Pangasinan, Philippines. It is the largest retailer in Northern Luzon.

From Pangasinan, La Union, Ilocos Sur, and Zambales, CSI has been operating for the past decade and provides services to customers. Adding support to its operations is the largest cable network operator in the region: USATV beaming to thousands of households and providing local news and public announcements as well as coverage of activities in and around Pangasinan. CSI is a major contributor to the economic growth of Region 1.

CSI includes 3 shopping malls and 22 retails.

== Stadia ==
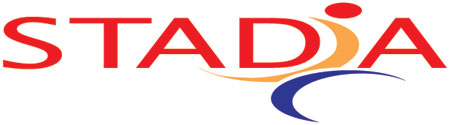
Stadia Logo

CSI Stadia is the largest purpose-built facility in Northern Luzon. An ideal venue for special events like wedding receptions, baptisms, rallies, conferences, trade shows and concerts. In Lucao District, Dagupan, Pangasinan, it is close to towns and other provinces in Northern and Central Luzon.

It is one of the most modern conference and sports center in Ilocos Region. Benedict Loy, national president of the Philippine Institute of Architects (PIA), described the structure as "the largest, most beautiful and most sophisticated convention center in Northern Luzon".

== Sari-Sari Store Fair ==
Sari-Sari Store Fair is a yearly activity held at the CSI Stadia in Dagupan, with at least 50 suppliers participating to market their products at discount prices.

DOLE and the Department of Trade and Industry have been partnering with CSI for the annual fair, which started in 2007.

Other activities during the event include free seminars and training on entrepreneurship, cooking demonstrations, and activities for children.

== Gallery ==
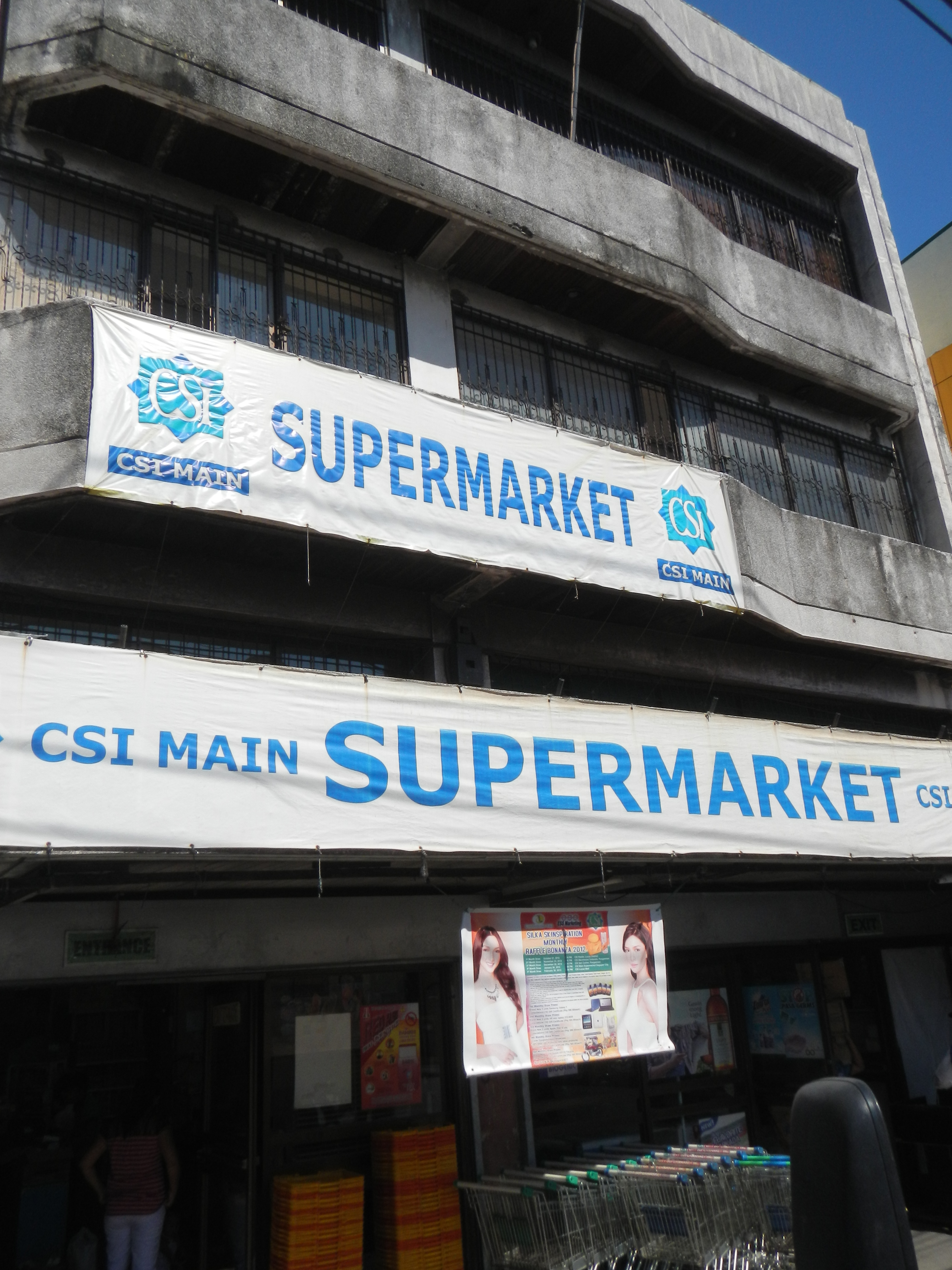
CSI Main Supermarket old

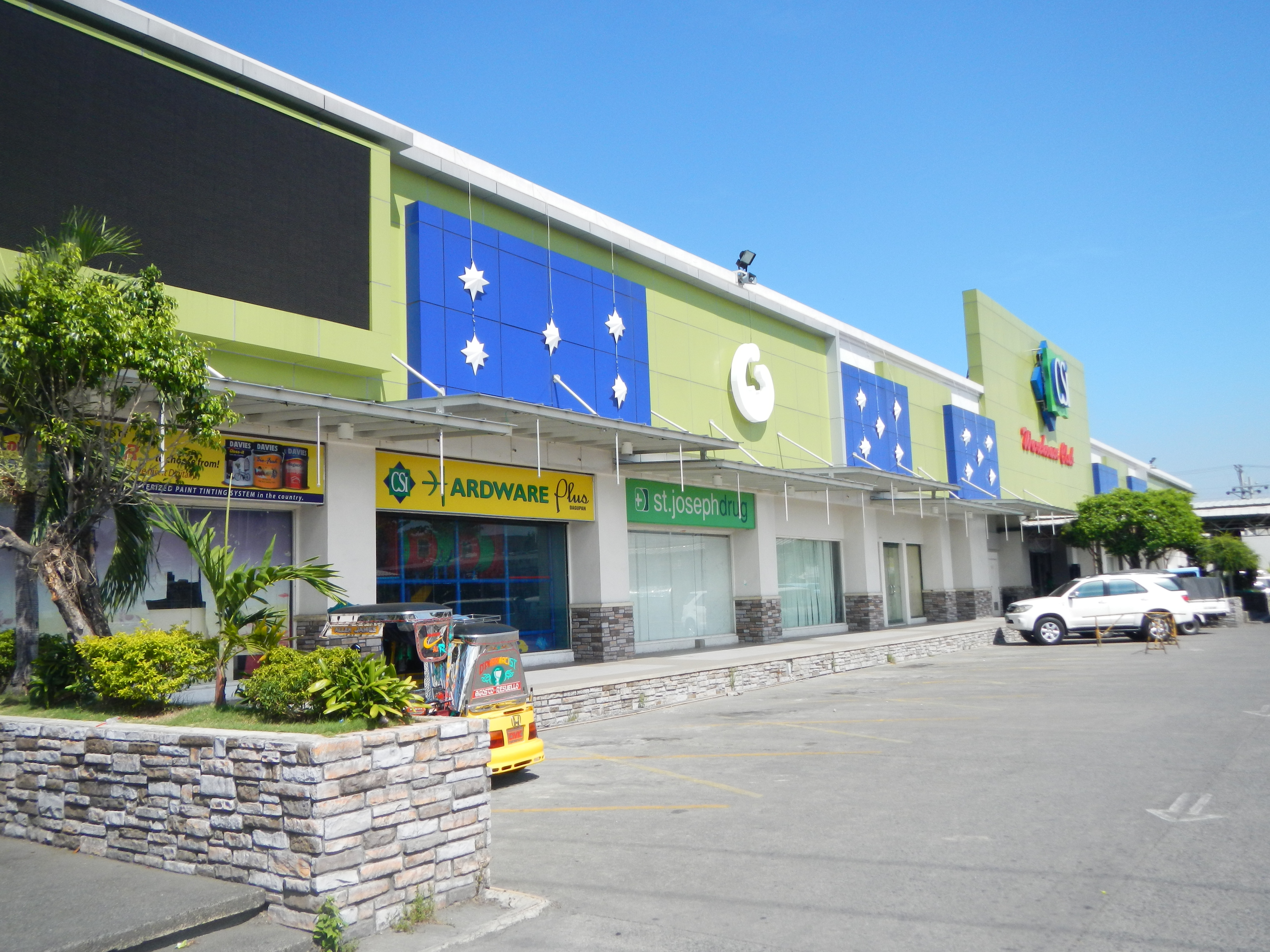
CSI Warehouse Club old

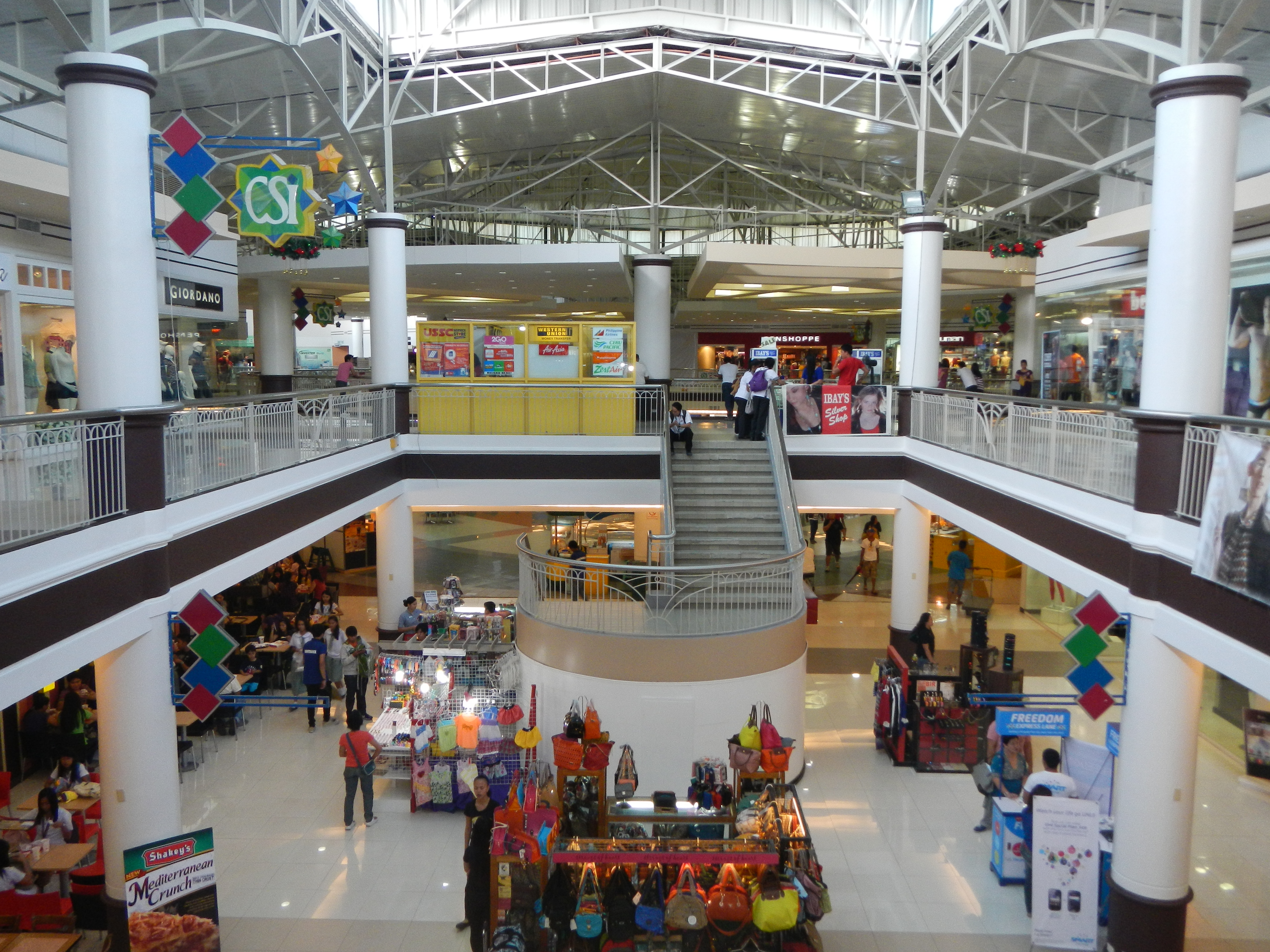
CSI Mall Dagupan inside

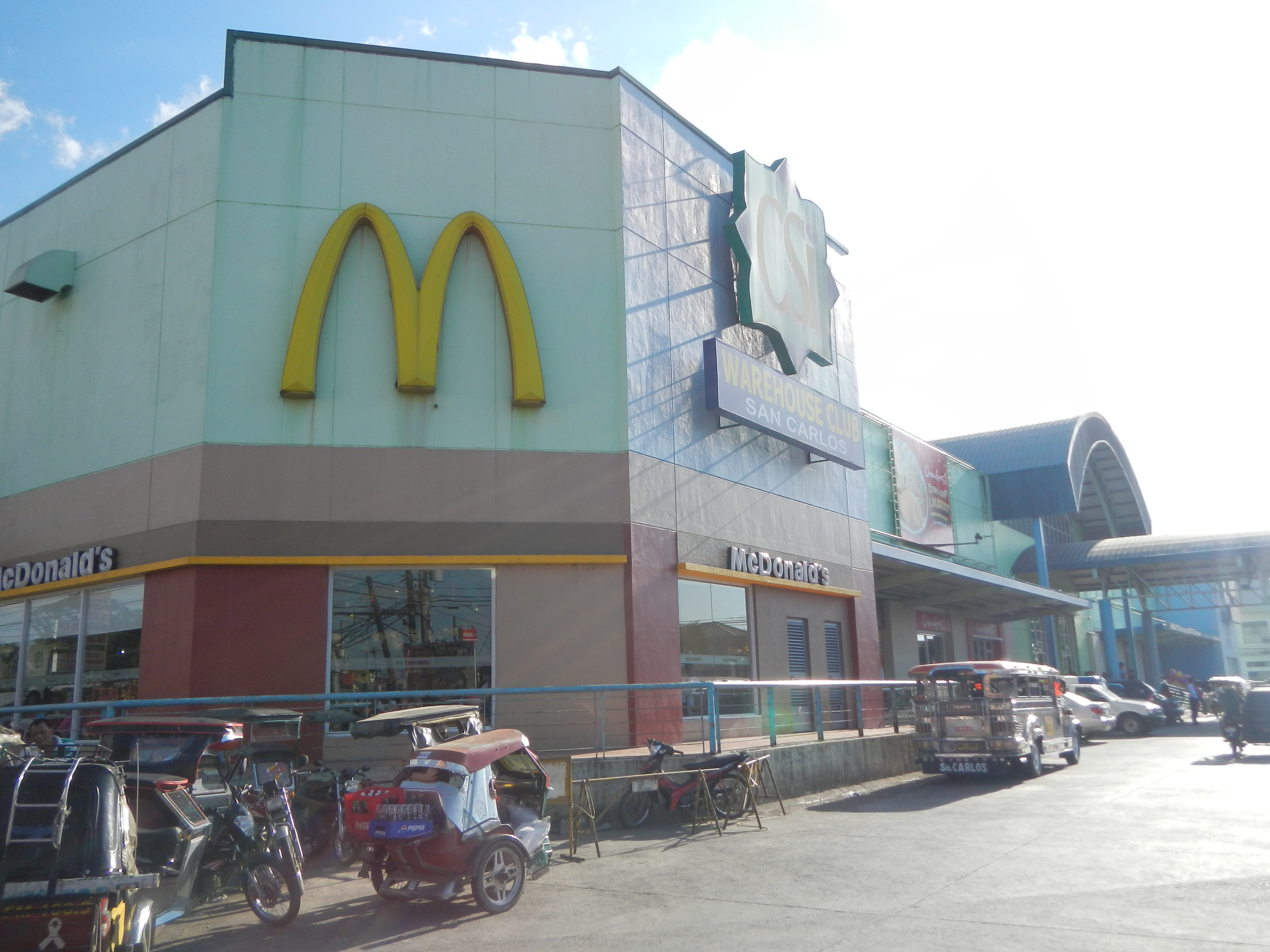
CSI San Carlos

CSI Market Square, Dagupan

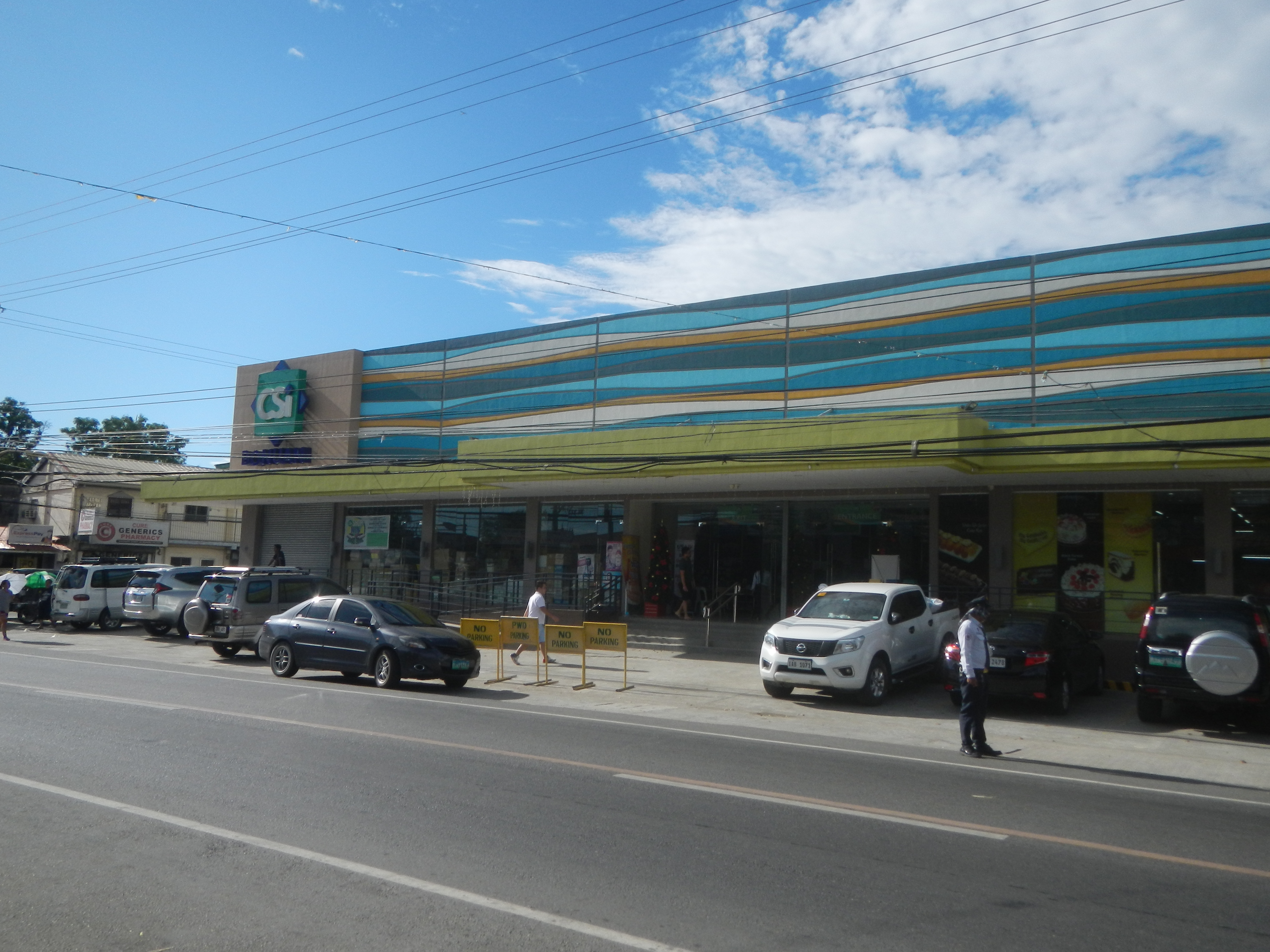
CSI Bonuan

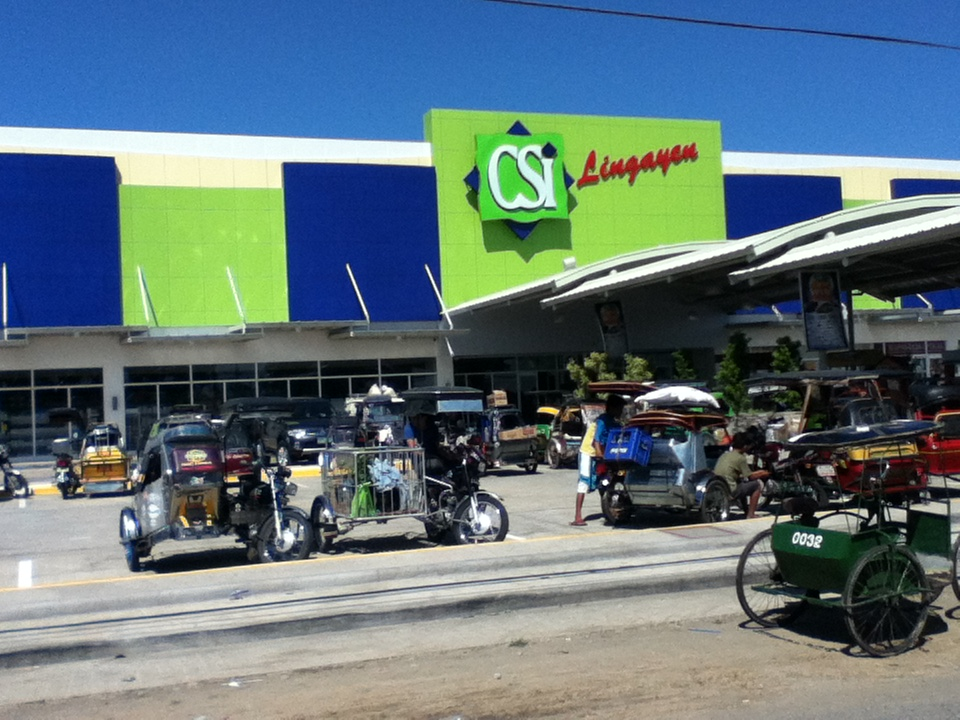
CSI Lingayen

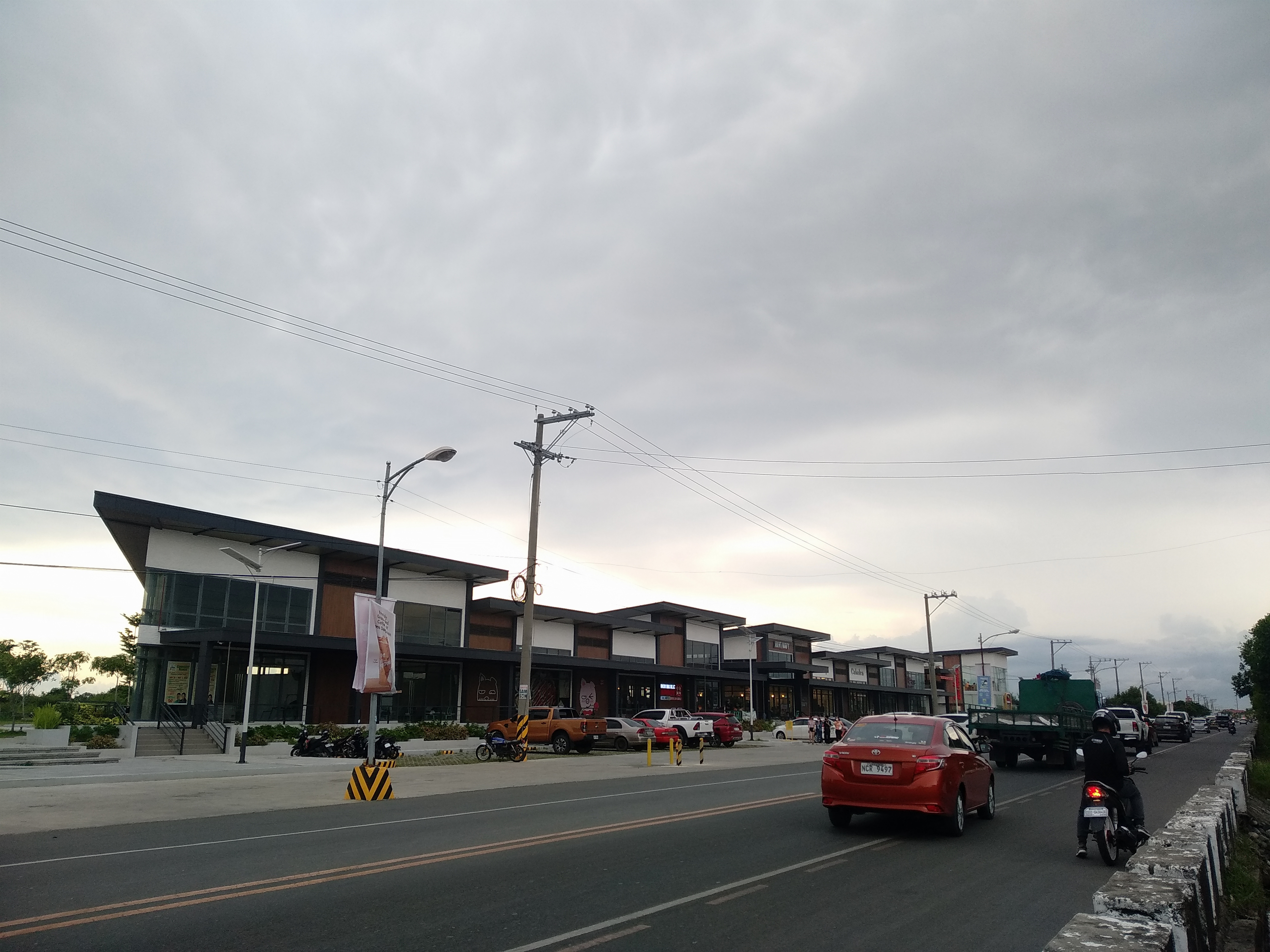
River Grove Lifestyle Center by CSI

== See also ==
- List of shopping malls in the Philippines
