= Computer Security Institute =

The Computer Security Institute (CSI) was a professional membership organization serving practitioners of information, network, and computer-enabled physical security, from the level of system administrator to the chief information security officer. It was founded in 1974.

CSI used to conduct two conferences per year — the Annual Computer Security Conference and Exhibition and CSI SX. Internet entrepreneur Jimmy Wales was a keynote speaker at CSI's Annual Conference, held November 6–8, 2006, in Orlando, Florida.

CSI is perhaps best known for the annual CSI/FBI Computer Crime and Security Survey that it began to conduct in 1996 in collaboration with the San Francisco Federal Bureau of Investigation's Computer Intrusion Squad and researchers from the Robert H. Smith School of Business at the University of Maryland. The FBI disappeared from the title of the study between the 2006 and 2007 reports. The 15th annual survey, which turned out to be the last, was released in 2011, and is available to the general public at Information Week.

CSI staff, including Richard Power, testified as expert witnesses before United States Senate committee hearings.

In 2011, CSI was absorbed by UBM, although no mention of this appears on the UBM Wikipedia page yet. As of September 2014, the original CSI website returns a 404 File Not Found error. However, snapshots of the website can be found on the WayBack Machine.
