= Uttarpara =

Uttarpara Uttarpara Kotrung
- City
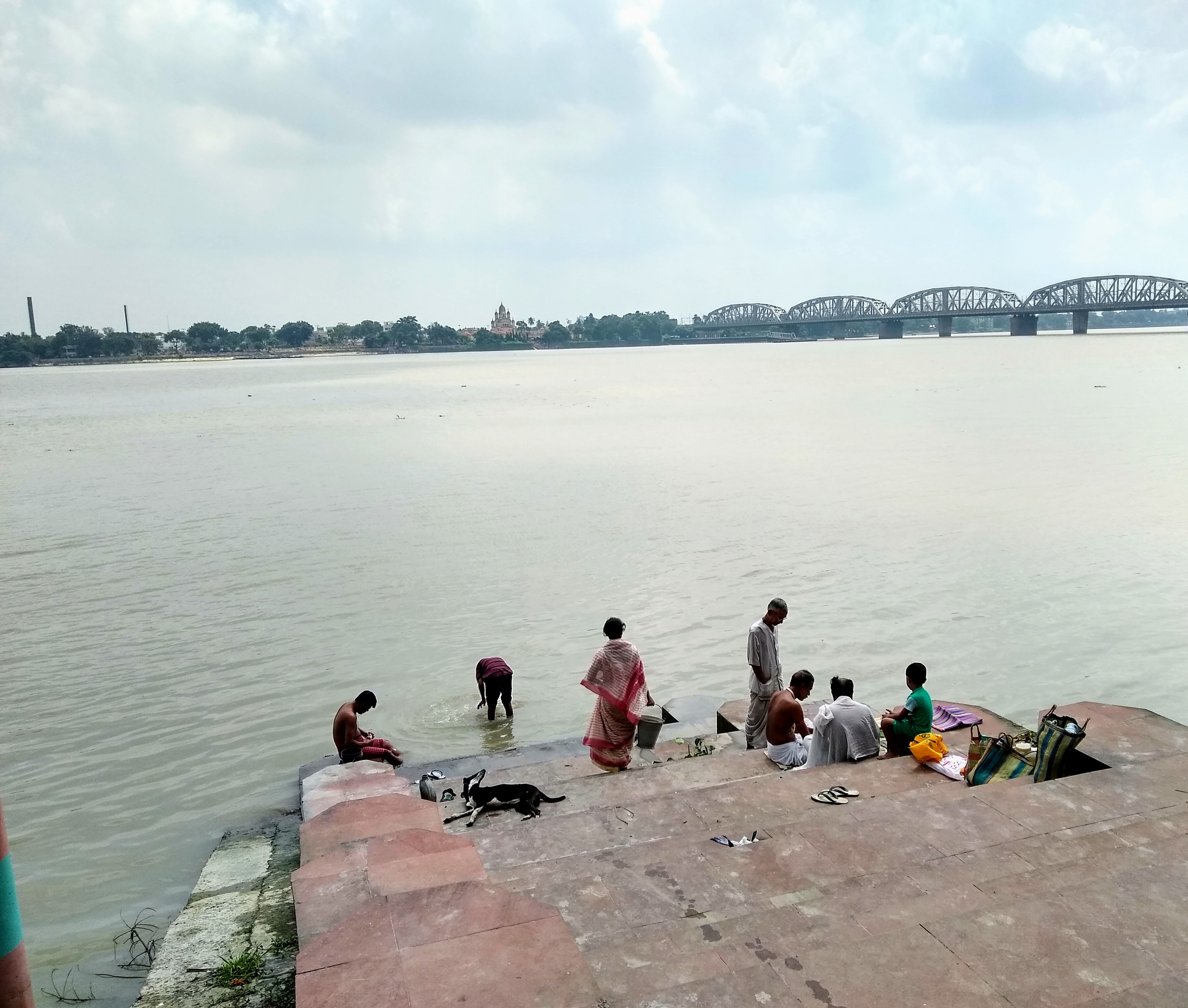
- College Ghat, Uttarpara

- Location in West Bengal, India Uttarpara (West Bengal) Uttarpara (India)
- Coordinates: 22.67°N 88.35°E
- Country: India
- State: West Bengal
- Division: Burdwan
- District: Hooghly
- Established: 1853

Government
  - Type: Municipality
  - Body: Uttarpara Kotrung Municipality
  - Municipality Chairperson: Dilip Yadav (AITC)

Area
  - Total: 11.75 km^{2} (4.54 sq mi)

Population (2011)
  - Total: 159,147
  - Density: 13,540/km^{2} (35,080/sq mi)

Languages
  - Official: Bengali
  - Additional official: English
- Time zone: UTC+5:30 (IST)
- PIN: 712258
- Telephone code: +91 33
- Vehicle registration: WB
- Lok Sabha constituency: Serampore
- Vidhan Sabha constituency: Uttarpara
- Website: www.uttarparamunicipality.in

Uttarpara or Uttarpara Kotrung is a city and a municipality of Hooghly district in the Indian state of West Bengal. It is a part of the area covered by Kolkata Metropolitan Development Authority (KMDA). Uttarpara is located at 22.67°N 88.35°E, within 10 km from Kolkata, the capital of the state of West Bengal. It is located along the Hooghly river, across from the Dakshineswar Kali Temple. Uttarpara is home to the Uttarpara Jayakrishna Public Library, Asia's oldest free public library.

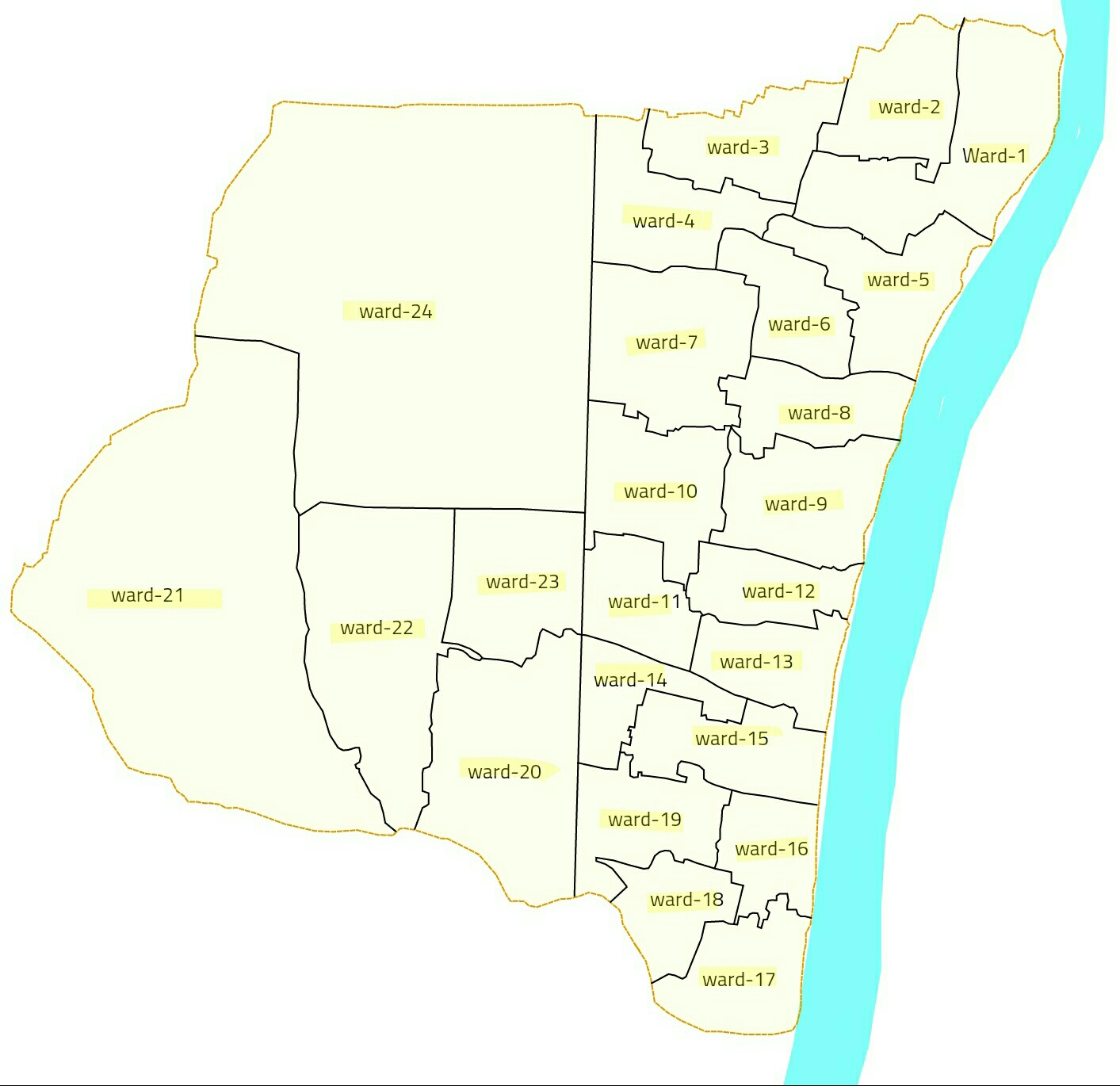
Map of Uttarpara Kotrung Municipality

== Geography ==
Cities and towns in the Sreerampur Uttarpara CD Block in Srirampore subdivision in Hooghly district
M: municipal city/ town, CT: census town,
Owing to space constraints in the small map, the actual locations in a larger map may vary slightly.

Uttarpara is at the southernmost part of Hooghly district. It is separated from Bally, Howrah by Bally Canal (Bally Khal). The old name of Uttarpara was "North Bally". A bridge was constructed in 1846 over the canal to connect Uttarpara with Bally.

== Demographics ==
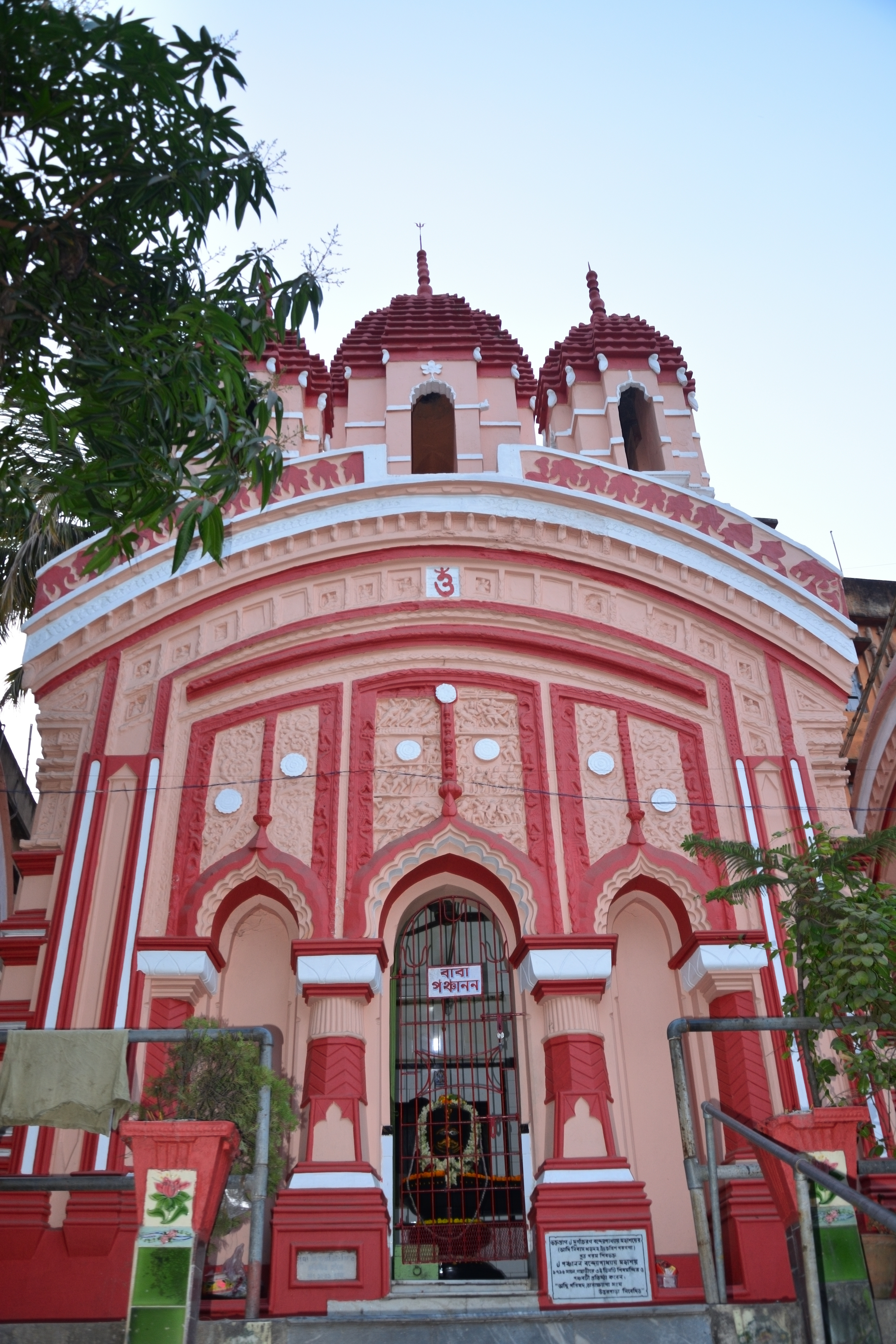
Pancharatna Temple of Uttarpara

As per the 2011 Census of India Uttarpara had a total population of 159,147 of which 81,410 (51%) were males and 77,737 (49%) were females. Population below 6 years was 11,760. The total number of literates in Uttarpara Kotrung was 133,610 (90.65% of the population over 6 years).

As of 2001 India census, Uttarpara Kotrung had a population of 150,204. Males constitute 52% of the population and females 48%. Uttarpara Kotrung has an average literacy rate of 79%, higher than the national average of 59.5%: male literacy is 82% and female literacy is 76%. In Uttarpara Kotrung, 8% of the population is under 6 years of age.

=== Kolkata Urban Agglomeration ===
The following municipalities and census towns in Hooghly district were part of Kolkata Urban Agglomeration in 2011 census: Bansberia (M), Hugli-Chinsurah (M), Bara Khejuria (Out Growth), Shankhanagar (CT), Amodghata (CT), Chak Bansberia (CT), Naldanga (CT), Kodalia (CT), Kulihanda (CT), Simla (CT), Dharmapur (CT), Bhadreswar (M), Champdani (M), Chandannagar (M Corp.), Baidyabati (M), Serampore (M), Rishra (M), Rishra (CT), Bamunari (CT), Dakshin Rajyadharpur (CT), Nabagram Colony (CT), Konnagar (M), Uttarpara Kotrung (M), Raghunathpur (PS-Dankuni) (M), Kanaipur (CT) and Keota (CT).

=== Languages ===
Languages spoken in Uttarpara Kotrung city (2011)
1. Bengali (73.9%)
2. Hindi (23.3%)
3. Odia (0.61%)
4. Santali (0.44%)
5. Marwari (0.30%)
6. Others (1.31%)

== Economy ==
=== Hindustan Motors ===
Uttarpara was home to India's first car factory, in Hindmotor neighbourhood, the Hindustan Motors Uttarpara factory, which produced the legendary Ambassador cars. The plant was closed in 2014 when production of the Ambassador was scrapped.

=== Titagarh Wagons ===
Titagarh Wagons is considered one of the leading wagon manufacturers in India. After the acquisition of Italy-based Firema Trasporti, the company encouraged the modernisation of its coach making plant at Uttarpara, which now produces ultra-modern India-made aluminum metro coaches.

=== Hiranandani Group ===
The Hiranandani Group entered into an MoU in the state of West Bengal. The group acquired a 100-acre land at Uttarpara, Kolkata from Hindustan Motors to set up an integrated logistics and hyperscale datacentre park by Hiranandani group companies GreenBase and Yotta respectively. The combined investment by the group and their customers is estimated to cross Rs 10,000 crore.

== Transport ==
=== Roadways ===
State Highway 6/ Grand Trunk Road (G.T. Road) passes through Uttarpara.

=== Bus service ===
- 2 Chunchura Court - Dakshineswar
- 285 Serampore - Salt Lake Sector-5
- 3 Serampore - Bagbazar/Salt Lake

=== Railways ===
Uttarpara railway station is situated in the Howrah-Bardhaman main line. It is part of the Kolkata Suburban Railway system.

== Culture ==
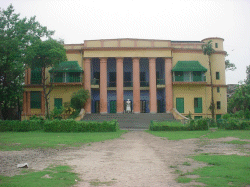
Uttarpara Joykrishna Library

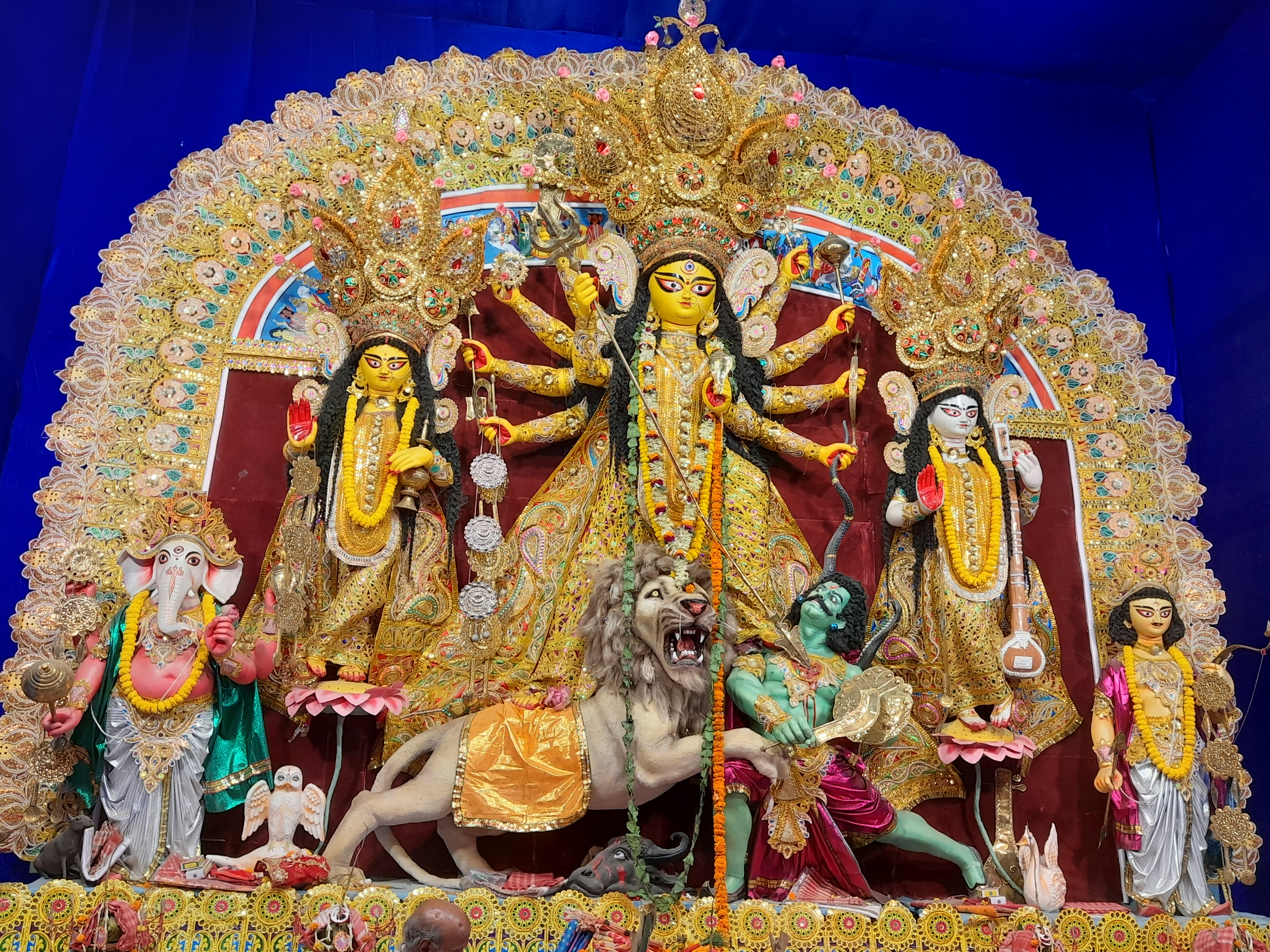
Uttarpara C. A. Math Durga Puja, 2022

Uttarpara boasts of a rich cultural heritage. The town once boasted of sylvan peace, beautiful buildings, epitome of great architectural works and steeped in cultural heritage. Bengali poet Michael Madhusudan Dutt spent his last days in Uttarpara Joykrishna Library. Uttarpara is also the home of numerous temples and is a destination site for tourists during Durga Puja for its majestic Balaka pandal.

== Education ==
=== Colleges ===
- Swami Niswambalananda Girls' College
- Raja Peary Mohan College

=== High schools ===
- Debiswari Vidyaytan
- Little Flowers' School
- Uttarpara Amarendra Vidyapith
- Uttarpara Govt. High School
- Dream Land School
- Hindmotor High School
- Uttarpara Children's Own Home
- Uttarpara Girls' High School
- Vision International School

Primary Schools

- Kamala Pathsala, Uttarpara
- Adarsha Vidyamandir
- Bapuji Primary School
- Bhadrakali Urban Junior Basic School
- Bibekdal Sishu Vidyapith
- Debiswari Siksha Niketan
- Deshapriya Balika Vidyamandir
- Dharsa Dedar Boksh
- Dipchand Vidyapith
- Dr Rajendra Sikshaniketan
- Haranathpur Primary School
- Jatindra Sishu Vidyapith
- Kartick Smriti UP Vidyalaya
- Kortong Bhupendra Smrity GSFP School
- Makhla GSFP
- Makhla Makaltala Primary School
- Makhla Pankajini Primary School
- Makhla Sitalatala Primary School
- Netaji Subhas Vidyalaya
- Parma Balika Vidyalaya
- Rabindra Bidya Bithi Primary School
- Sabuj Sathi Prathamik Vidyalaya
- Shree Shankar Vidyalaya
- Shri Shri Gourimata Prathamik Vidyalaya
- Sishu Tirtha Primary School
- Uttarpara Amarendra Vidyapith
- Uttarpara Girls' High School

== Governance ==
Uttarpara Kotrung is governed by the Uttarpara Kotrung Municipality, one of the oldest civic bodies in West Bengal, established in 1853. This municipality is responsible for the administration and development of the region, providing essential civic services such as water supply, sanitation, solid waste management, street lighting, and upkeep of public infrastructure.

The municipality is divided into 24 wards. The chairperson, Dilip Kumar Yadav, oversees the overall development of Uttarpara, Kotrung, Bhadrakali, and Makhla areas. He is affiliated with the All India Trinamool Congress party.

Electorally, Uttarpara Kotrung is included in the Uttarpara Assembly constituency, which is part of the No. 27 Sreerampur Lok Sabha constituency. According to the orders of the Delimitation Commission, the Uttarpara Assembly constituency comprises the Uttarpara Kotrung Municipality, Konnagar Municipality, and the Nabagram, Kanaipur, and Raghunathpur gram panchayats of the Sreerampur Uttarpara community development block. In the 2021 Assembly elections, Mr. Kanchan Mullick of the TMCP was elected as the MLA. For law and order, the area falls under the jurisdiction of the Uttarpara Police Station, which is part of the Chandannagar Police Commissionerate.

== Notable people ==
- Pramada Charan Banerjee, judge in the Allahabad High Court
- Amarendranath Chatterjee, freedom fighter
- Malay Roy Choudhury, founder of the Hungry generation movement
- Pritam Kotal, footballer (India, Mohun Bagan A.C., Delhi Dynamos FC)
- Manilal Nag, sitar player
- Samir Roychoudhury, member of Krittibas group and co-founder of the "Hungryalist" movement
- Babul Supriyo, politician, singer and actor

== See also ==
- Uttarpara Public Library
