= Singur (community development block) =

- Community development block
- Coordinates: 22.81°N 88.23°E
- Country: India
- State: West Bengal
- District: Hooghly

Government
  - Type: Representative democracy

Area
  - Total: 164.85 km^{2} (63.65 sq mi)
- Elevation: 16 m (52 ft)

Population (2011)
  - Total: 276,413
  - Density: 1,676.8/km^{2} (4,342.8/sq mi)

Languages
  - Official: Bengali, English
- Time zone: UTC+5:30 (IST)
- PIN: 712409 (Singur)
- STD: 033
- ISO 3166 code: IN-WB
- Vehicle registration: WB-15, WB-16, WB-18
- Literacy: 84.07%
- Lok Sabha constituency: Hooghly, Arambag
- Vidhan Sabha constituency: Singur, Haripal
- Website: hooghly.gov.in

Singur is a community development block that forms an administrative division in Chandannagore subdivision of Hooghly district in the Indian state of West Bengal.

== Overview ==
The Singur CD Block is part of the Hooghly-Damodar Plain, one of the three natural regions in the district, of the flat alluvial plains that forms part of the Gangetic Delta. The region has many depressions which receive water from the surrounding lands during the rainy season and discharge the water through small channels.

== History ==
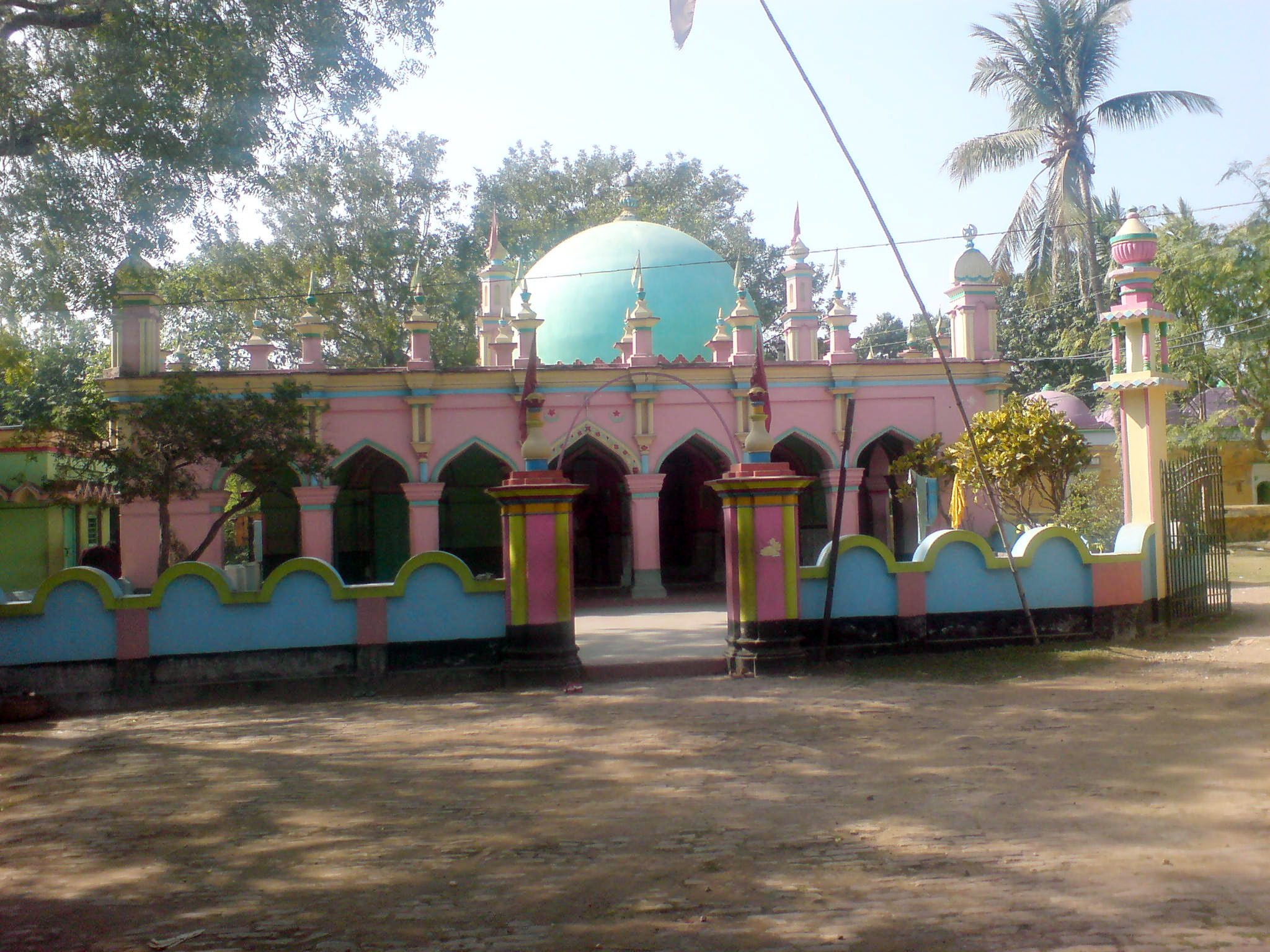
The Basubati Faqir Bari is home to the mosque and mazar (mausoleum) of Sufi saint Khwajah Naziful Islam Chishti.

According to Binoy Ghosh, the word “Singur” is believed to a derivative of the word “Singhapur”. In the Sri Lankan Mahavamsa there is mention of two towns – Singhapur and Banganagar, both believed to be located in the ancient Rarh region. Some scholars feel that Singur is the place where ancient Singhapur was located. According to the Sri Lankan chronicles Prince Vijaya, son of Singhabahu, king of Singhapur, sailed from Singhapur, landed in Sri Lanka in 544 BC and became the king. In those days the people of what later came to be called as Bengal were known to be seafaring and the mighty Saraswati used to flow through the Singur area. Therefore, this seems to be feasible according to some scholars, but other scholars feel that it is more hearsay than actual proven history.

== Geography ==
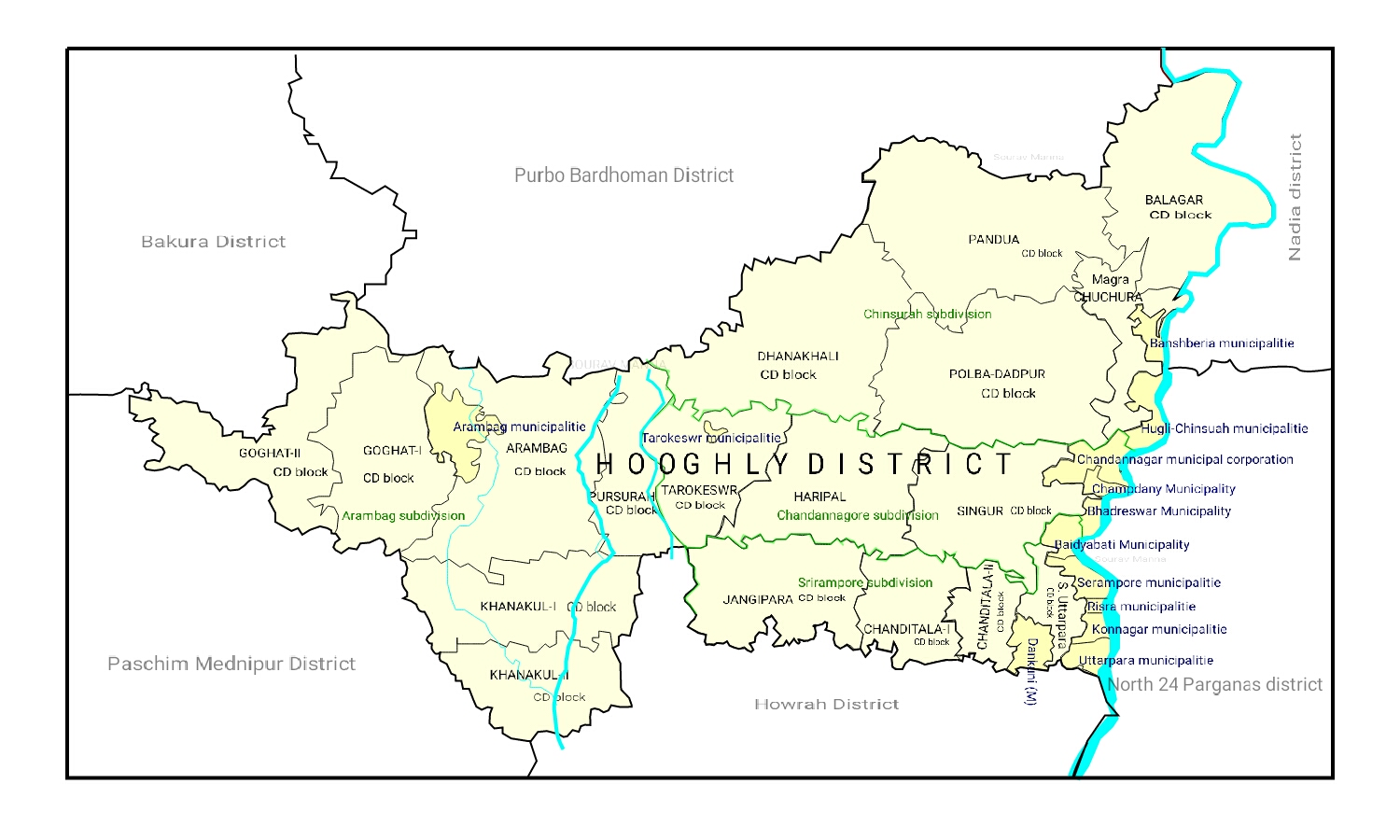
Map of Hooghly district showing CD blocks and municipal areas

Singur is located at 22°49′N 88°14′E.

Singur CD Block is bounded by Polba Dadpur CD Block in the north, Chandernagore Municipal Corporation, Bhadreswar Municipality, Champdany Municipality, Sreerampur Uttarpara CD Block in the east, Chanditala I and Chanditala II CD Blocks in the south and Haripal CD Block in the west.

It is located 22 km from Chinsurah, the district headquarters.

Singur CD Block has an area of 164.85 km^{2}. It has 1 panchayat samity, 16 gram panchayats, 240 gram sansads (village councils), 108 mouzas and 98 inhabited villages. Singur and Bhadreswar police stations serve this block. Headquarters of this CD Block is at Singur.

Map of Singur CD block sowing GP areas

Gram panchayats of Singur block/ panchayat samiti are: Anandanagar, Bagdanga-Chinamore, Balarambati, Baruipara-Paltagarh, Basubati, Berabari, Bighati, Boinchipota, Bora, Borai-Pahalampur, Gopalnagar, Kamarkundu Gopalnagar Doluigachha, Mirjapur-Bankipur, Nasibpur, Singur I and Singur II.

== Demographics ==
=== Population ===
As per the 2011 Census of India, Singur CD Block had a total population of 276,413, of which 223,951 were rural and 52,462 were urban. There were 140,334 (51%) males and 136,079 (50%) females. Population below 6 years was 24,276. Scheduled Castes numbered 47,037 (17.02%) and Scheduled Tribes numbered 4,069 (1.47%).

As per the 2001 census, Singur block had a total population of 260,729, out of which 131,286 were males and 129,443 were females. Singur block registered a population growth of -1.65 per cent during the 1991-2001 decade. Decadal growth for Hooghly district was 15.72 per cent. Decadal growth in West Bengal was 17.84 per cent.

Census Towns in Singur CD Block are (2011 census figures in brackets): Balarambati (5,068), Singur (21,382), Nasibpur (7,557), Jagatnagar (5,242), Baruipara (6,737) and Borai (6,522).

Large villages (with 4,000+ population) in Singur CD Block are (2011 census figures in brackets): Beraberi (6,810), Gopalnagar (12,232), Dewan Bheri (5,687), Bainchipota (4,019), Atisara (6,113), Daluigachha (4,123), Mirzapur Bankipur (5,842), Shibrambati (4,208), Basubati (4,256), Ramnagar (4,006), Pahlanpur (6,034), Bara Kamalapur (20,047) and Bighati (4,388).

Other villages in Singur CD Block include (2011 census figures in brackets): Anandanagar (3,915), Bajemelia (3,659), Khaser Bheri (790) and Sinher Bheri (1,563).

=== Literacy ===
As per the 2011 census the total number of literates in Singur CD Block was 211,984 (84.07% of the population over 6 years) out of which males numbered 113,548 (88.77% of the male population over 6 years) and females numbered 98,436 (79.24% of the female population over 6 years). The gender disparity (the difference between female and male literacy rates) was 9.54%.

As per the 2001 census, Singur block had a total literacy of 60.72 per cent. While male literacy was 79.52 per cent, female literacy was 52.49 per cent.

See also – List of West Bengal districts ranked by literacy rate

Literacy in CD blocks of
Hooghly district
Arambagh subdivision
Arambagh – 79.10
Khanakul I – 77.73
Khanakul II – 79.16
Goghat I – 78.70
Goghat II – 77.24
Pursurah – 82.12
Chandannagar subdivision
Haripal – 78.59
Singur – 84.01
Tarakeswar – 79.96
Chinsurah subdivision
Balagarh – 76.94
Chinsurah Mogra – 83.01
Dhaniakhali – 75.66
Pandua – 75.86
Polba Dadpur – 75.14
Srirampore subdivision
Chanditala I – 83.76
Chanditala II – 84.78
Jangipara – 75.34
Sreerampur Uttarpara – 87.33
Source: 2011 Census: CD Block Wise
Primary Census Abstract Data

=== Language and religion ===
Religion in Singur CD block (2011)
Hinduism	90.72%
Islam	8.92%
Other or not stated	0.36%

As per the 2011 census, majority of the population of the district belong to the Hindu community with a population share of 82.9% followed by Muslims at 15.8%. The percentage of the Hindu population of the district has followed a decreasing trend from 87.1% in 1961 to 82.9% in the latest census 2011. On the other hand, the percentage of Muslim population has increased from 12.7% in 1961 to 15.8% in 2011 census.

In the 2011 census, Hindus numbered 250,758 and formed 90.72% of the population in Singur CD Block. Muslims numbered 24,665 and formed 8.92% of the population. Others numbered 990 and formed 0.36% of the population.

In 2011, Hindus numbered 4,574,569 and formed 82.89% of the population in Hooghly district. Muslims numbered 870,204 and formed 15.77% of the population. In West Bengal Hindus numbered 64,385,546 and formed 70.53% of the population. Muslims numbered 24,654,825 and formed 27.01% of the population.

Languages of Singur block (2011)
1. Bengali (98.3%)
2. Hindi (1.12%)
3. Others (0.56%)

At the time of the 2011 census, 98.32% of the population spoke Bengali and 1.12% Hindi as their first language.

== Administration ==
=== Zilla Parishad ===
Singur CD Block has 3 Zilla Parishad seats. The latest elections were held in July 2023 where the Trinamool Congress won all 3 seats.

Zilla Parishad	ZP No.	Councillor	Party	Remarks
Singur	4	Shyamali Chatterjee	Trinamool Congress	
Singur	5	Purnima Ghosh Malik	Trinamool Congress	
Singur	6	Madan Mohan Koley	Trinamool Congress	

=== Panchayat Samiti ===
Singur Panchayat Samiti has 48 divisions. The latest elections were held in July 2023 where the Trinamool Congress by winning a landslide majority of 46 division against CPI(M)'s 1 and BJP's 1.

Chairperson: Tumpa Ghosh
Deputy Chairperson: Manick Chandra Das
Gram Panchayat	No.	Councillor	Party	Remarks
Beraberi	1	Moumita Pakira	Trinamool Congress	
Beraberi	2	Rita Koley	Trinamool Congress	
Beraberi	3	Manick Chandra Das	Trinamool Congress	
Gopalnagar	4	Bipasa Shee	Trinamool Congress	
Gopalnagar	5	Ashima Malick Kamley	Trinamool Congress	
Gopalnagar	6	Srima Das	Trinamool Congress	
Anandanagar	7	Biswajit Mishra	Trinamool Congress	
Anandanagar	8	Barnali Kanrar	Communist Party of India (Marxist)	
Anandanagar	9	Ratu Kanta Jana	Trinamool Congress	
Boinchipota	10	Kabita Samanta	Trinamool Congress	
Boinchipota	11	Sailen Chandra Bag	Trinamool Congress	
Boinchipota	12	Nirmal Patra	Trinamool Congress	
Bagdanga-Chhinamore	13	Shatabdi Roy	Trinamool Congress	
Bagdanga-Chhinamore	14	Chhaya Dey	Trinamool Congress	
Bagdanga-Chhinamore	15	Sheikh Shamsuddin	Trinamool Congress	
Singur-I	16	Chitra Basu	Trinamool Congress	
Singur-I	17	Sheikh Umar	Trinamool Congress	
Singur-I	18	Goutam Chatterjee	Trinamool Congress	
Singur-II	19	Sudha Maiti	Trinamool Congress	
Singur-II	20	Mousumi Sambui	Trinamool Congress	
Singur-II	21	Bijali Ghosh	Trinamool Congress	
Mirzapur-Bankipur	22	Tumpa Ghosh	Trinamool Congress	
Mirzapur-Bankipur	23	Sukumar Dey	Trinamool Congress	
Mirzapur-Bankipur	24	Jharna Koley	Trinamool Congress	
Nasibpur	25	Sribas Ghosh	Trinamool Congress	
Nasibpur	26	Sandhya Mouri	Trinamool Congress	
Nasibpur	27	Tapan Kumar Malik	Trinamool Congress	
Bighati	28	Usha Rani Das	Trinamool Congress	
Bighati	29	Shanti Ram Das	Trinamool Congress	
Bighati	30	Naba Kumar Dhank	Trinamool Congress	
Baruipara-Paltagarh	31	Indira Santra	Bharatiya Janata Party	
Baruipara-Paltagarh	32	Bappaditya Gorang	Trinamool Congress	
Baruipara-Paltagarh	33	Tina Man	Trinamool Congress	
Borai-Pahalampur	34	Ujjwal Kumar Som	Trinamool Congress	
Borai-Pahalampur	35	Jharna Malik	Trinamool Congress	
Borai-Pahalampur	36	Anita Ghosh	Trinamool Congress	
Bora	37	Jadabi Ghosh	Trinamool Congress	
Bora	38	Ananda Santra	Trinamool Congress	
Bora	39	Sampa Tanti	Trinamool Congress	
Kamarkundu-Gopalnagar-Doluigachha	40	Madhabi Santra	Trinamool Congress	
Kamarkundu-Gopalnagar-Doluigachha	41	Madhumita Singha Roy Das	Trinamool Congress	
Kamarkundu-Gopalnagar-Doluigachha	42	Sulata Dhara	Trinamool Congress	
Balarambati	43	Susanta Bag	Trinamool Congress	
Balarambati	44	Mitali Adak	Trinamool Congress	
Balarambati	45	Sheikh Mohammad Alim	Trinamool Congress	
Basubati	46	Rubi Begam	Trinamool Congress	
Basubati	47	Jayanta Das	Trinamool Congress	
Basubati	48	Pradip Kodal	Trinamool Congress	

=== Gram Panchayats ===
Singur Panchayat Samiti has 16 villages or gram panchayats. The latest elections were held in July 2023 where the Trinamool Congress won 14 villages, the CPI(M) won 2. The BJP was not able to gain majority in any panchayat.

No.	Gram Panchayat	Total Seats							Majority
No.	Gram Panchayat	Total Seats	AITC	BJP	SDA			Others	Majority
No.	Gram Panchayat	Total Seats	AITC	BJP	CPI(M)	INC	AIFB	Others	Majority
1	Beraberi	14	11	0	2	0		1	AITC
2	Gopalnagar	20	16	3	1	0		0	AITC
3	Anandanagar	14	10	0	4	0		0	AITC
4	Boinchipota	17	15	0	2	0		0	AITC
5	Bagdanga-Chhinamore	20	14	4	2	0		0	AITC
6	Singur-I	12	10	0	1	0		1	AITC
7	Singur-II	18	17	1	0			0	AITC
8	Mirzapur-Bankipur	17	16	1	0			0	AITC
9	Nasibpur	23	22	0	1	0		0	AITC
10	Bighati	13	11	2	0			0	AITC
11	Baruipara-Paltagarh	21	12	7	1	0		1	AITC
12	Borai-Pahalampur	19	18	1	0			0	AITC
13	Bora	23	12	7	4	0		0	AITC
14	Kamarkundu-Gopalnagar-Doluigachha	20	19	1	0			0	AITC
15	Balarambati	17	15	1	1	0		0	AITC
16	Basubati	15	14	1	0			0	AITC
Total		283	232	29	19	0	0	3	

== Rural poverty ==
As per poverty estimates obtained from household survey for families living below poverty line in 2005, rural poverty in Singur CD Block was 18.39%.

== Economy ==
=== Livelihood ===
Livelihood
in Singur CD Block
1. Cultivators (16.4%)
2. Agricultural labourers (16.3%)
3. Household industries (8.11%)
4. Other Workers (59.1%)

In Singur CD Block in 2011, amongst the class of total workers, cultivators formed 16.40%, agricultural labourers 16.34%, household industry workers 8.11% and other workers 59.15%.

=== Infrastructure ===
There are 98 inhabited villages in Singur CD Block. 100% villages have power supply. 64 villages have more than one source of drinking water (tap, well, tube well, hand pump), 23 villages have only tube well/ borewell and 9 villages have only hand pump. 9 Villages have post offices, 16 villages have sub post offices and 2 villages have post and telegraph offices. 86 villages have landlines, 51 villages have public call offices and 92 villages have mobile phone coverage. 44 villages have pucca roads and 21 villages have bus service (public/ private). 15 villages have agricultural credit societies, 15 villages have commercial/ co-operative banks and 1 village has bank ATM.

=== Tata Motors at Singur ===
Singur gained international media attention since Tata Motors started constructing a factory to manufacture their $2,500 car, the Tata Nano at Singur. The small car was scheduled to roll out of the factory by 2008. In October 2008 Tatas announced withdrawal from the project. Six villages – Bajemelia, Beraberi, Gopalnagar, Joymolla, Khaserbheri and Singherberi – were affected by land acquisition. In 2016, the Supreme Court quashed the West Bengal government's acquisition of 997 acres of agricultural land for Tata Motors and ordered its return to 9,117 landowners.

Important Handicrafts of Hooghly District
- Zari Work on Sari - Pandua, Pursurah, Jangipara, Tarakeswar and other blocks - 3,000 families involved
- Chikon Embroidery – Babnan, Pandua, Singur - 2,500 families involved
- Silk and Cotton Printing – Serampore (Chanditala) - 300 families involved
- Brass and Bell Metal – Manikpat, Goghat, Arambagh - 150 families involved
- Conch Shell – Pandua, Khanakul, Makla, Chandannagar
- Jute Diversified Product – Baidyabati, Mogra
- Terracota – Chinsurah, Chandannagar, Baidyabati, Mogra

Source:District Human Development Report 2010: Hooghly P. 67

=== Agriculture ===
This is a rich agricultural area with several cold storages. Though rice is the prime crop of the district, the agricultural economy largely depends on potato, jute, vegetables, and orchard products. Vegetable is a prize crop in the blocks of Haripal, Singur, Chanditala, Polba and Dhaniakhali being grown in a relay system throughout the year. Though potato is cultivated in all the blocks of this district Dhaniakhali, Arambagh, Goghat, Pursurah, Haripal, Polba-Dadpur, Tarakeswar, Pandua and Singur contributed much of its production of this district.

Some of the primary and other hats or markets in the Singur block area are: Kamarkundu hat, Singur market, Ratanpur hat, Bora bazaar, Beraberi market, Banipara market, Basubati hat, Bhadreswar station bazaar and Kalisori Babu bazar.

The Tebhaga movement launched in 1946, in 24 Parganas district, aimed at securing for the share-croppers a better position within the existing land relation structure. Although the subsequent Bargadari Act of 1950 recognised the rights of bargadars to a higher share of crops from the land that they tilled, it was not implemented fully. Large tracts, beyond the prescribed limit of land ceiling, remained with the rich landlords. From 1977 onwards major land reforms took place in West Bengal. Land in excess of land ceiling was acquired and distributed amongst the peasants. Following land reforms land ownership pattern has undergone transformation. In 2013–14, persons engaged in agriculture in Singur CD Block could be classified as follows: bargadars 7.56%, patta (document) holders 4.06%, small farmers (possessing land between 1 and 2 hectares) 3.58%, marginal farmers (possessing land up to 1 hectare) 41.98% and agricultural labourers 42.82%.

Singur CD Block had 193 fertiliser depots, 23 seed stores and 68 fair price shops in 2013–14.

In 2013–14, Singur CD Block produced 48,445 tonnes of Aman paddy, the main winter crop from 17,310 hectares, 5,479 tonnes of Boro paddy (spring crop) from 1,670 hectares, 6 tonnes of Aus paddy (summer crop) from 2 hectares, 12 tonnes wheat from 5 hectares, 53,343 tonnes of jute from 2,267 hectares, 58,151 tonnes of potatoes from 3,049 hectares. It also produced oilseeds .

In 2013–14, the total area irrigated in Singur CD Block was 11,086 hectares, out of which 5,605 hectares were irrigated by canal water, 1,950 hectares by tank water, 100 hectares by river lift irrigation, 1,040 hectares by deep tube wells and 2,391 hectares by shallow tube wells.

=== Banking ===
In 2013–14, Singur CD Block had offices of 26 commercial banks and 4 gramin bank.

== Transport ==
Singur CD Block has 5 originating/ terminating bus routes.

The broad gauge Sheoraphuli–Tarakeswar branch line was opened by the Tarkessur Railway Company on 1 January 1885 and was worked by East Indian Railway Company. The Tarkessur company was taken over by the East Indian Railway in 1915. There are stations at Diara, Nasibpur, Singur and Kamarkundu on the Howrah-Tarakeswar branch line.

The Howrah–Bardhaman chord, a shorter link to Bardhaman from Howrah than the Howrah–Bardhaman main line, was constructed in 1917. There are stations at Baruipara, Mirzapur-Bankipur, Balarambati and Kamarkundu.

The Howrah-Bardhaman main line passes through this CD Block and there are stations at Bhadrehwar, Mankundu and Chandannagar. The stations located in the cities/ municipal towns are outside the CD Block.

It is part of Kolkata Suburban Railway system.

The Kolkata-Delhi NH 19/ Durgapur Expressway and SH 2 running from Bankura to Malancha (in North 24 Parganas district) pass through this CD Block.

== Education ==
In 2013–14, Singur CD Block had 178 primary schools with 13,589 students, 3 middle schools with 148 students, 13 high schools with 4,547 students and 21 higher secondary schools with 24,125 students. Singur CD Block had 377 institutions for special and non-formal education with 6,524 students

Singur Government College, a general degree college, was established at Singur in 2013.

In Singur CD Block, amongst the 98 inhabited villages, 7 villages had no school, 61 villages had more than 1 primary school, 65 villages had at least 1 primary school, 26 villages had at least 1 primary and 1 middle school and 21 villages had at least 1 middle and 1 secondary school.

== Healthcare ==
In 2014, Singur CD Block had 1 rural hospital, 3 primary health centres and 5 private nursing homes with total 125 beds and 10 doctors (excluding private bodies). It had 43 family welfare subcentres. 6,881 patients were treated indoor and 271,106 patients were treated outdoor in the hospitals, health centres and subcentres of the CD Block.

Singur CD Block has Singur Rural Hospital (with 60 beds) at Singur, Bajemelia Primary Health Centre at PO Gopalnagar (with 10 beds), Balarambati PHC (with 10 beds) and Bora PHC with (10 beds).

Singur CD Block is one of the areas of Hooghly district where ground water is affected by moderate level of arsenic contamination. The WHO guideline for arsenic in drinking water is 10 mg/ litre, and the Indian Standard value is 50 mg/ litre. In Hooghly district, 16 blocks have arsenic levels above WHO guidelines and 11 blocks above Indian standard value. The maximum concentration in Singur CD Block is 100 mg/litre.
