= Bargachhia =

- Census Town
- Location in West Bengal, India Bargachhia (India)
- Coordinates: 22.833333°N 88.178667°E
- Country: India
- State: West Bengal
- District: Hooghly
- Named after: Rath Yatra

Government
  - Type: Panchayati Raj
  - Body: Nalikul Purba Gram Panchayat

Area
  - Total: 2.34 km^{2} (0.90 sq mi)
- Elevation: +15 m (49 ft)

Population (2011)
  - Total: 4,566
  - Density: 1,950/km^{2} (5,050/sq mi)
- Demonym: Bangali

Languages
  - Official: Bengali, English
- Time zone: UTC+5:30 (IST)
- PIN: 712407
- Telephone code: 03212
- Vehicle registration: WB
- Lok Sabha constituency: Arambagh
- Vidhan Sabha constituency: Haripal
- Website: hooghly.nic.in

Bargachhia is a census town of Nalikul Purba Gram Panchayat in Haripal CD Block in Chandannagore subdivision of Hooghly district in the Indian state of West Bengal.

== Geography ==
Cities and towns in the Chandannagore subdivision and Polba Dadpur and Dhaniakhali CD Blocks of Chinsurah subdivision in Hooghly district
M: municipal corporation/ municipal city/ town, CT: census town, R: rural/ urban centre,
Owing to space constraints in the small map, the actual locations in a larger map may vary slightly

=== Location ===
Bargachhia is located at 22.833333°N 88.178667°E.

The area is composed of flat alluvial plains that form a part of the Gangetic Delta.

=== Urbanisation ===
In Chandannagore subdivision 58.52% of the population is rural and the urban population is 41.48%. Chandannagore subdivision has 1 municipal corporation, 3 municipalities and 7 census towns. The single municipal corporation is Chandernagore Municipal Corporation. The municipalities are Tarakeswar Municipality, Bhadreswar Municipality and Champdany Municipality. Of the three CD Blocks in Chandannagore subdivision, Tarakeswar CD Block is wholly rural, Haripal CD Block is predominantly rural with just 1 census town, and Singur CD Block is slightly less rural with 6 census towns. Polba Dadpur and Dhaniakhali CD Blocks of Chinsurah subdivision (included in the map alongside) are wholly rural. The municipal areas are industrialised. All places marked in the map are linked in the larger full screen map.

=== Transport ===
Main transport facilities are Indian Railways and bus services. Nearest railway station is Nalikul located inside the southwest part of the census town. The CT is bounded in the south by SH 2.

== Education ==
- Nalikul Desh Bandhu Bani Mandir
- Bargachhia Upper Primary School

== Health Infrastructures ==
One sub center is located in this area. Nearest PHC is Bandipur PHC about 2 KM away from the Census Town. Two rural hospitals are situated about 9 KM away towards east Singur RH and 8 KM away towards west Haripal RH.

== Demographics ==
As per 2011 Census of India Bargachhia had a total population of 4,566 of which 2,350 (51%) were males and 2,216 (49%) were females. Population below 6 years was 422. The total number of literates in Bargachhia was 3,391 (81.83% of the population over 6 years).
