= Singur =

- Census town
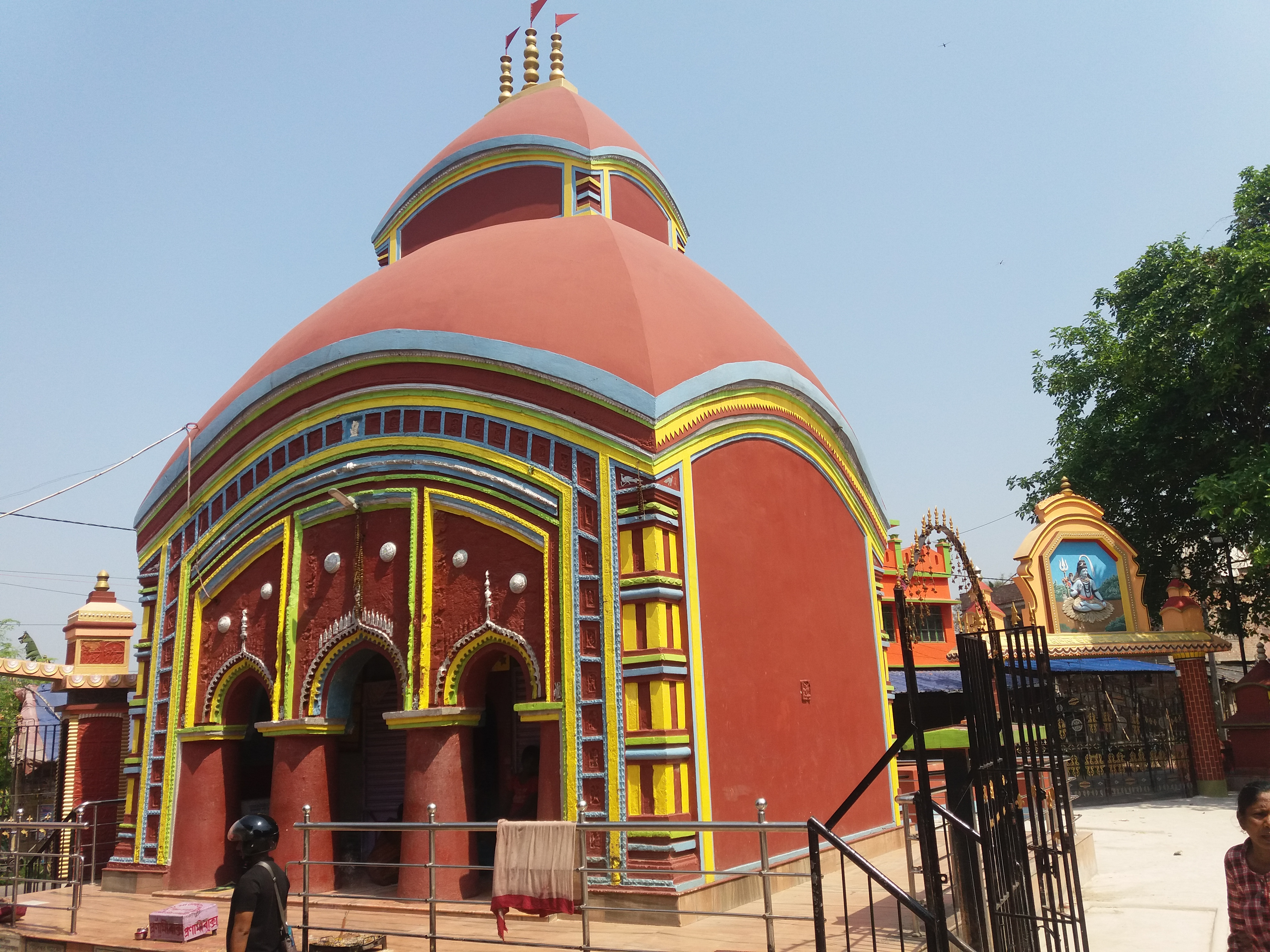
- Dakat Kali Temple, Singur

- Location in West Bengal, India Singur (India)
- Coordinates: 22.81°N 88.23°E
- Country: India
- State: West Bengal
- District: Hooghly
- Elevation: 14 m (46 ft)

Population (2011)
  - Total: 21,382

Languages
  - Official: Bengali, English
- Time zone: UTC+5:30 (IST)
- Postal code: 712 409
- Telephone/STD code: 03326
- Vehicle registration: WB
- Lok Sabha constituency: Hooghly
- Vidhan Sabha constituency: Singur

Singur is a census town in Singur CD block in Chandannagore subdivision of Hooghly district in the Indian state of West Bengal.

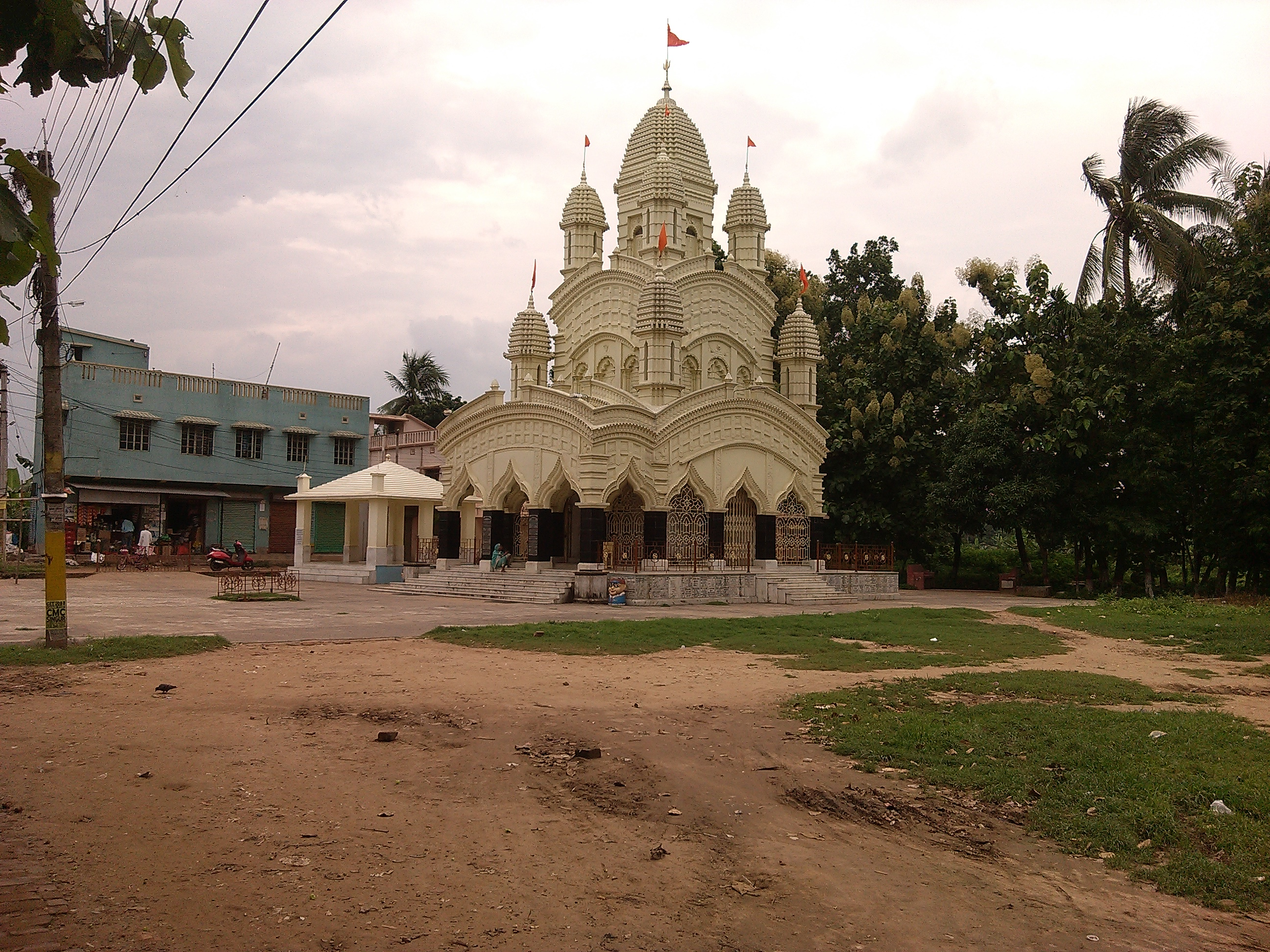
Jagatnagar Kalibari, near Singur

== Etymology ==
Documented research, particularly the analysis of the Pali chronicle Mahavamsa, suggests that Singur is the modern phonological evolution of Simhapura.

The Legend

It is believed to be the capital founded by King Sinhabahu (Lion-armed), the father of Prince Vijaya. According to the Mahavamsa, Prince Vijaya was exiled from this city in the Rarh region (ancient Bengal) around 543 BCE, from where he sailed to conquer Lanka (Sri Lanka).

While some claim Simhapura was in Gujarat, Bengali historians (notably H.C. Raychaudhuri) argue that the geographical descriptions of the journey—passing through the realm of the Magadhas—strongly place the capital in the Rarh region of West Bengal, specifically identifying it with Singur.

== Geography ==
Cities and towns in the Chandannagore subdivision and Polba Dadpur and Dhaniakhali CD blocks of Chinsurah subdivision in Hooghly district
M: municipal corporation/ municipal city/ town, CT: census town, R: rural/ urban centre.
Owing to space constraints in the small map, the actual locations in a larger map may vary slightly.

=== Location ===
Singur is located at 22.81°N 88.23°E. It has an average elevation of 14 metres (45 ft), and is situated on the Ganges delta.

The villages comprising Singur include Balarambati, Dewan Bheri, Dobandi, Baburberi, Khasherbheri, Joymolla, Ujjal Sangha, Beraberi, Khagragachi East & West, Bajemelia, Anandanagar, Deb Design Gallery, Ratanpur, Gopalnagar, Apurbapur, Jalaghata, Daluigacha East and West, Mirzapur, Bankipur, Boinchipota, Nabapally, Beleghata, Khosalpur, Pawnan, Gandarpukur, Dasani & Choyani, Ratanpur 1 & 2, Singherbheri, Nasibpur, Mollasimla, Rasulpur, Durgarampur, Dansi, Deshapara, Diara, Gobindapur, Hakimpur, Nanda, Habaspota, Naskarpur, Nabapally, Chhutipur, Subhipur, Notun Bazar, Benipur, Antisara, Burashanti, Ghanashyampur, Paltagorh, Telipukur, Khaserchak, Batriskhura, Alurbadh, Durgarampur, Biramnagar and Harishnagar.

Some Upscale neighborhood under Singur census town are Nabapally, Green Park, Vivekananda pally, Vidyut Pally, Shantipuram Sector 1 and 2, Beltala lane, Sarada Sarani, Milandeep and Daluigacha East.

=== Police station ===
Singur police station has jurisdiction over Singur CD block.

=== CD block HQ ===
The headquarters of Singur CD block are located at Singur.

=== Urbanisation ===
In Chandannagore subdivision 58.52% of the population is rural and the urban population is 41.48%. Chandannagore subdivision has one municipal corporation, three municipalities and seven census towns. The single municipal corporation is Chandernagore Municipal Corporation. The municipalities are Tarakeswar Municipality, Bhadreswar Municipality and Champdani Municipality. Of the three CD blocks in Chandannagore subdivision, Tarakeswar CD block is wholly rural, Haripal CD block is predominantly rural with just one census town, and Singur CD block is slightly less rural with six census towns. Polba Dadpur and Dhaniakhali CD blocks of Chinsurah subdivision (included in the map below) are wholly rural. The municipal areas are industrialised. All places marked in the map are linked in the larger full screen map.

== Demographics ==
Approximately 32000 people live in Singur Census town in 2025

As per the 2011 Census of India, Singur census town had a total population of 21,382, of which 10,825 (51%) were males and 10,557 (49%) were females. The population below 6 years old was 1,646. The total number of literates in Singur was 17,458 (88.46% of the population over 6 years old).

As of the 2001 India census, Singur had a population of 19,539. Males constituted 51% of the population and females 49%. Singur had an average literacy rate of 76%, higher than the national average of 59.5%: male literacy was 81%, and female literacy was 71%. In Singur, 9% of the population were under 6 years of age.

Purusottampur is one of the oldest villages in Singur. Adi Biswalakhi Mandir, Dakat Kali Mandir, Anandamoyee Kali Mandir, Santosimar Mandir and Shib Mandir are situated in this village.

== Economy ==
=== Tata Motors at Singur ===
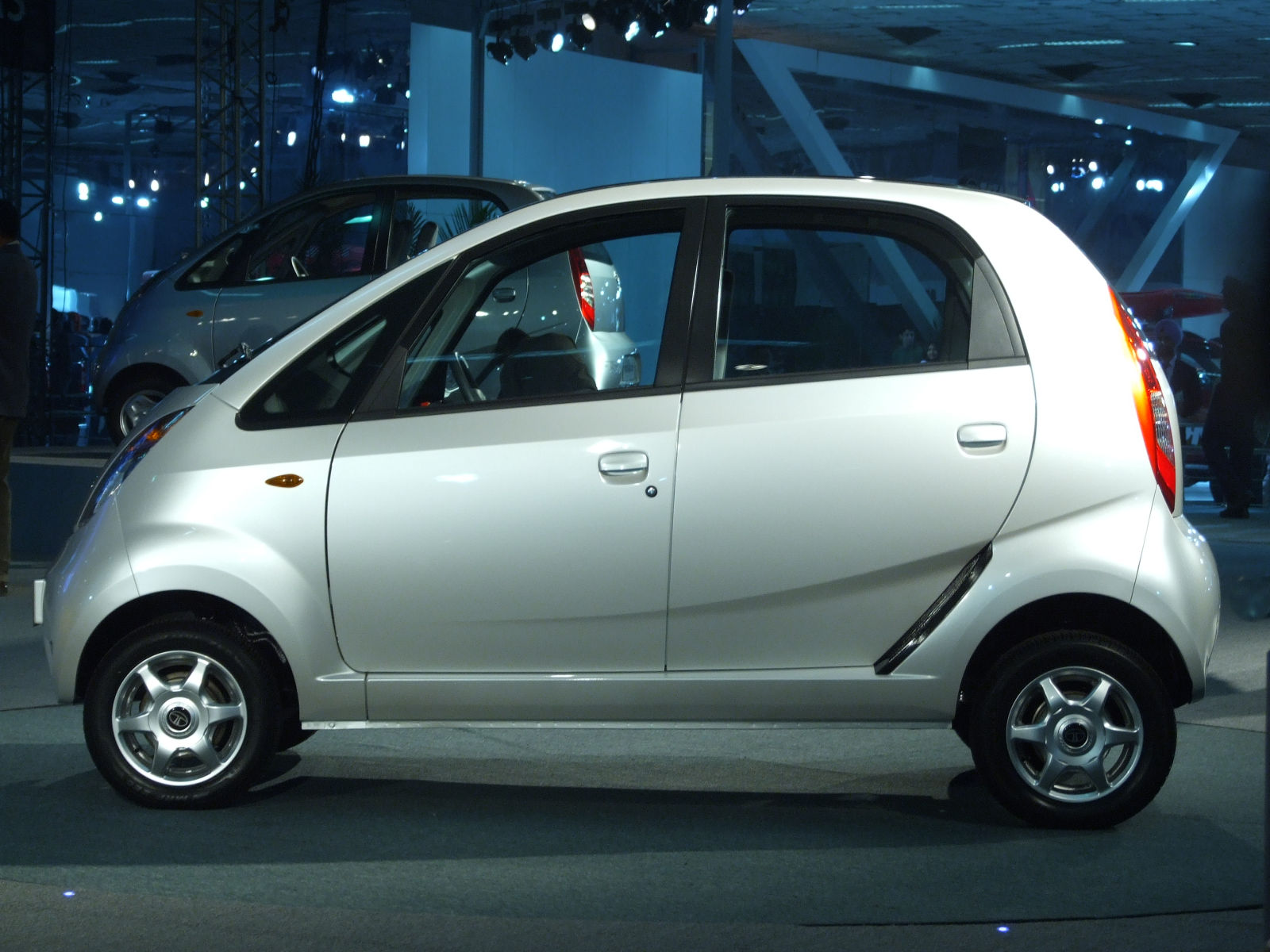
Tata Nano

Singur gained international media attention since Tata Motors started constructing a factory to manufacture their $2,500 car, the Tata Nano, at Singur. The small car was scheduled to roll out of the factory by 2008. In October 2008 Tatas announced its withdrawal from the project. In 2016, the Supreme Court quashed the West Bengal government's acquisition of 997 acres of agricultural land for Tata Motors and ordered its return to 9,117 landowners.

=== Himadri Speciality Chemical ===
Himadri Speciality Chemical Ltd operates one of its major plants in Singur opposite the abandoned Tata Motors factory. HSCL is the third largest producer of carbon black in India, and has a 17% share of the market.

Singur Ratanpur is one of the largest potato market in West Bengal.

There is also a well established Cad Industry in Singur where almost 8,000 people are directly employed

== Transport ==
=== Rail ===
Singur is well connected with Howrah Junction railway station. Local trains runs between Singur railway station and Howrah Station via Sheoraphuli railway station. Around 32 lakh people from all around the city commute to Kolkata daily for work. In the Howrah-Tarakeswar section there are 48 trains that carry commuters from 21 railway stations.

=== Roads ===
Singur is well connected with Kolkata through Durgapur Expressway (NH 2), Baidyabati to Tarkeswar connected road as (SH 2).

And also available inter town auto and E. Ricksa service

== Education ==
Singur Government College, a general degree college, was established at Singur in 2013. It is affiliated with the University of Burdwan and offers honours courses in Bengali, English, Physics, Chemistry, Mathematics, Botany, Zoology, Computer Science, Geography, Sanskrit, Santhali, History, Philosophy, Political Science, Sociology and Psychology.

There are several schools in Singur, including Madhubati Surabala Vidyamandir, Jogamaya Memorial Institute, Mahamaya High School, Golap Mohini Mallick Girls' High School, Anandanagar A C Roy High School, D. D. Bharati Vidyalaya, D.D. Bharati Balika Vidyalaya Anandanagar Ramanath High School, Gopalnagar High School, Beraberi SNM High School, Star Land School, Explore International, Educare School, Nasibpur High School, Paltagarh High School, Swami Vivekananda School, Nandan and Abani Sishu Niketan.
