= Balarambati =

- Census Town
- Location in West Bengal, India Balarambati (India)
- Coordinates: 22.8215°N 88.2174°E
- Country: India
- State: West Bengal
- District: Hooghly

Population (2011)
  - Total: 5,068

Languages
  - Official: Bengali, English
- Time zone: UTC+5:30 (IST)
- Telephone code: 03214
- Vehicle registration: WB
- Lok Sabha constituency: Arambagh
- Vidhan Sabha constituency: Haripal
- Website: hooghly.gov.in

Balarambati is a census town in Singur CD Block in Chandannagore subdivision of Hooghly district in the Indian state of West Bengal.

== Geography ==
Cities and towns in the Chandannagore subdivision and Polba Dadpur and Dhaniakhali CD Blocks of Chinsurah subdivision in Hooghly district
M: municipal corporation/ municipal city/ town, CT: census town, R: rural/ urban centre,
Owing to space constraints in the small map, the actual locations in a larger map may vary slightly

=== Location ===
Balarambati is located at 22.8215°N 88.2174°E.

The area is composed of flat alluvial plains that form a part of the Gangetic Delta.

=== Urbanisation ===
In Chandannagore subdivision 58.52% of the population is rural and the urban population is 41.48%. Chandannagore subdivision has 1 municipal corporation, 3 municipalities and 7 census towns. The single municipal corporation is Chandernagore Municipal Corporation. The municipalities are Tarakeswar Municipality, Bhadreswar Municipality and Champdany Municipality. Of the three CD Blocks in Chandannagore subdivision, Tarakeswar CD Block is wholly rural, Haripal CD Block is predominantly rural with just 1 census town, and Singur CD Block is slightly less rural with 6 census towns. Polba Dadpur and Dhaniakhali CD Blocks of Chinsurah subdivision (included in the map alongside) are wholly rural. The municipal areas are industrialised. All places marked in the map are linked in the larger full screen map.

== Demographics ==
As per 2011 Census of India Balarambati had a total population of 5,068 of which 2,558 (50.47%) were males and 2,510 (49.52%) were females. Population below 6 years was 454. The total number of literates in Balarambati was 4,122 (89.34% of the population over 6 years).

== Transport ==
Balarambati is on the State Highway 2 (also known as the Baidyabati-Tarakeswar Road). Balarambati railway station on Howrah-Bardhaman chord serves the locality.

== Education ==
Madhubati Surabala Vidyamandir and Srirampur Madhubati Bijonbijari Balika Vidyalaya are the two co-educational high school in Balarambati. Also there are around 15 primary school.Madhubati Surabala Vidyamandir was established in 1947. It has arrangements for teaching from Class VI to XII.
