= Baruipara =

- Census town
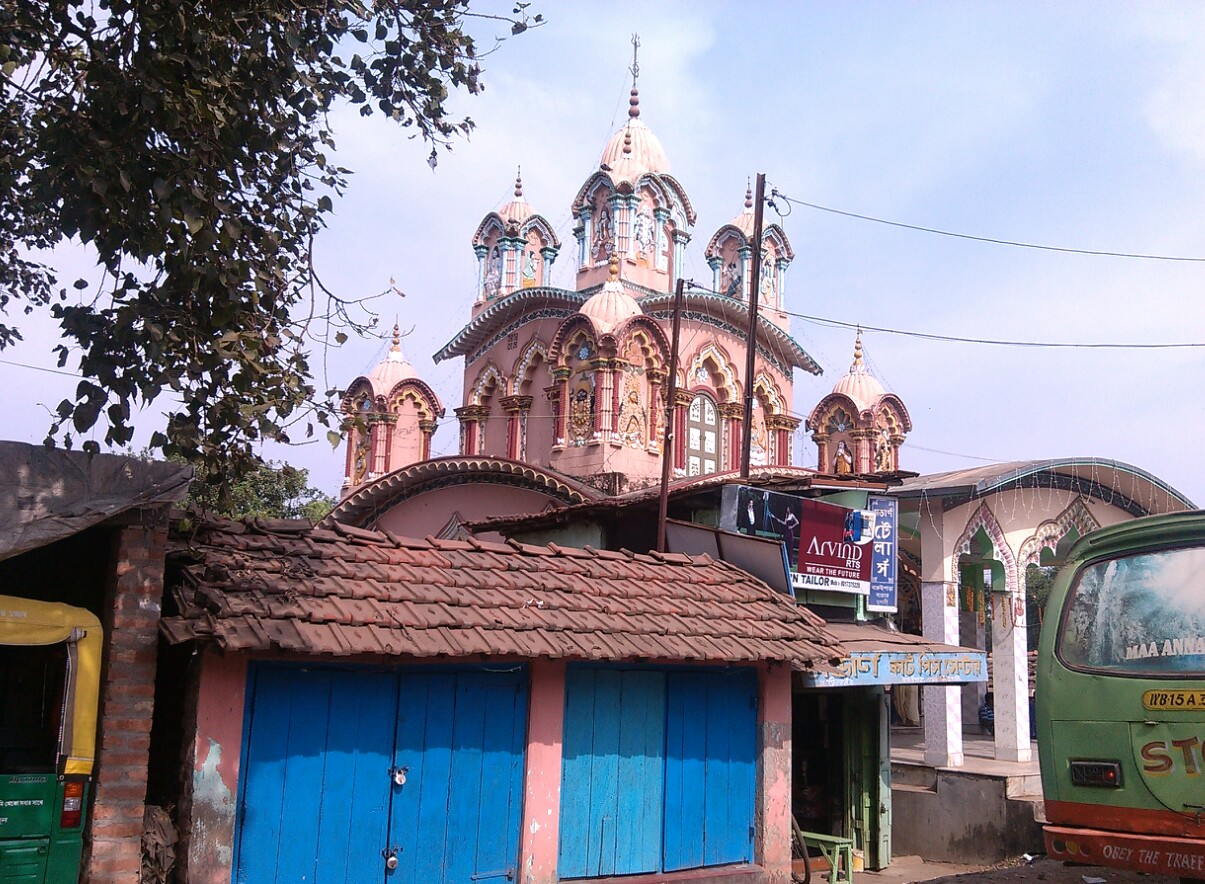
- Baruipara Kali Mandir

- Location in West Bengal, India Baruipara (India)
- Coordinates: 22.7573862°N 88.242937°E
- Country: India
- State: West Bengal
- District: Hooghly

Population (2011)
  - Total: 6,731

Languages
  - Official: Bengali, English
- Time zone: UTC+5:30 (IST)
- PIN: 712306
- Vehicle registration: WB
- Lok Sabha constituency: Hooghly
- Vidhan Sabha constituency: Singur

Baruipara is a census town in Singur CD block in Chandannagore subdivision of Hooghly district in the state of West Bengal, India.

== Geography ==
Cities and towns in the Chandannagore subdivision and Polba Dadpur and Dhaniakhali CD blocks of Chinsurah subdivision in Hooghly district
M: municipal corporation/ municipal city/ town, CT: census town, R: rural/ urban centre.
Owing to space constraints in the small map, the actual locations in a larger map may vary slightly.

=== Location ===
Baruipara is located at 22°45′27″N 88°14′35″E in Hooghly district, West Bengal.

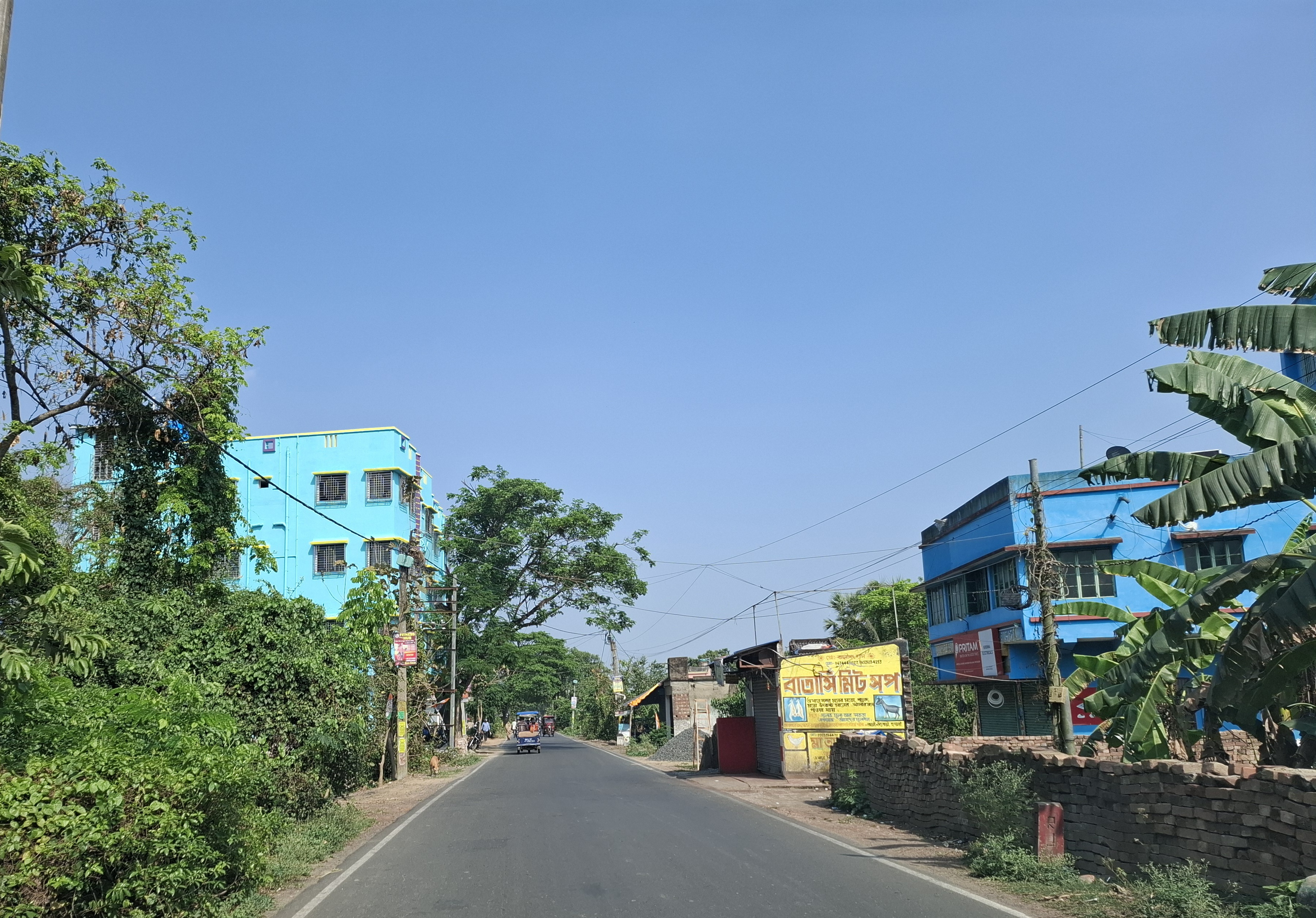
Baruipara, the census town of Hooghly district

The area is composed of flat alluvial plains that form a part of the Gangetic Delta.

=== Urbanisation ===
In Chandannagore subdivision 58.52% of the population is rural and the urban population is 41.48%. Chandannagore subdivision has 1 municipal corporation, 3 municipalities and 7 census towns. The single municipal corporation is Chandernagore Municipal Corporation. The municipalities are Tarakeswar Municipality, Bhadreswar Municipality and Champdany Municipality. Of the three CD blocks in Chandannagore subdivision, Tarakeswar CD block is wholly rural, Haripal CD block is predominantly rural with just one census town, and Singur CD block is slightly less rural with six census towns. Polba Dadpur and Dhaniakhali CD blocks of Chinsurah subdivision (included in the map alongside) are wholly rural. The municipal areas are industrialised. All places marked in the map are linked in the larger full screen map.

== Demographics ==
As per the 2011 Census of India Baruipara (CT) had a total population of 6,731 of which 3,486 (52%) were males and 3,245 (48%) were females. The population below 6 years was 626. The total number of literates in Baruipara was 5,227 (85.62% of the population over 6 years).

=== Dankuni Urban Agglomeration ===
As per the 2011 census, Dankuni Urban Agglomeration includes: Dankuni (M), Purba Tajpur (CT), Kharsarai (CT), Begampur (CT), Chikrand (CT), Pairagachha (CT), Barijhati (CT), Garalgachha (CT), Krishnapur (CT), Baruipara (CT), Borai (CT), Nawapara (CT), Basai (CT), Gangadharpur (CT), Manirampur (CT), Janai (CT), Kapashanria (CT), Jaykrishnapur (CT), Tisa (CT), Baksa (CT), Panchghara (CT) and Naiti (CT).

== Economy ==
Around a total of 32 lakh people from all around the city commute to Kolkata daily for work. In the Howrah-Bardhaman (chord line) section there are 48 trains that carry commuters from 30 railway stations.

== Transport ==
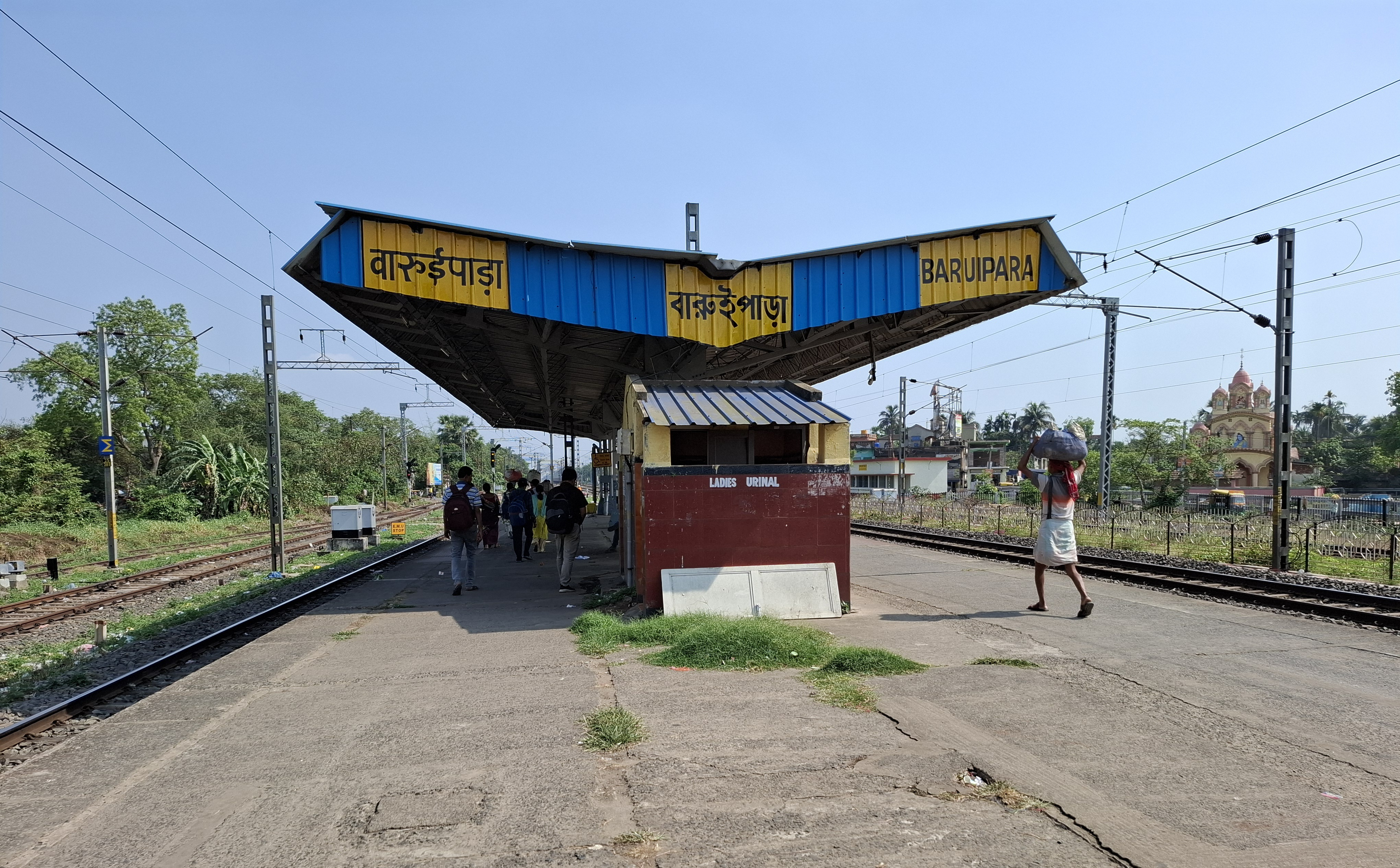
Baruipara railway station platform

Baruipara railway station is 27 kilometres (17 mi) from Howrah on the Howrah–Bardhaman chord line and is part of the Kolkata Suburban Railway system. The main road 31 Number Road. It is the main artery of the town and it is connected with Ahilyabai Holkar Road (Sehakhala), National Highway 19 (Bora), State Highway 13 (Milki Badamtala) and State Highway 6/ G.T. Road (Nabagram). There is 31 Number Private Bus from Jangipara bus stand to Serampore bus stand via Furfura Sharif, Sehakhala, Banmalipur, Gangadharpur, Baruipara and Milki Badamtala. There is auto and trecker service from Baruipara to Masat also.
