= Anandanagar =

- Village
- Location in West Bengal, India Anandanagar (India)
- Coordinates: 22.8562456°N 88.2167816°E
- Country: India
- State: West Bengal
- District: Hooghly

Government
  - Type: Panchayati raj (India)
  - Body: Gram panchayat

Area
  - Total: 249.63 km^{2} (96.38 sq mi)
- Elevation: 10 m (33 ft)

Population (2001)
  - Total: 3,963
  - Density: 15.88/km^{2} (41.12/sq mi)

Languages
  - Official: Bengali, English
- Time zone: UTC+5:30 (IST)
- Telephone code: 03213
- ISO 3166 code: IN-WB
- Lok Sabha constituency: Hooghly
- Vidhan Sabha constituency: Singur

Anandanagar is a village (village code 01920300, JL no 38) in Anandanagar Gram Panchayat in Singur CD block in Chandannagore Subdivision of Hooghly district in the Indian state of West Bengal.

== Geography ==
Anandanagar is at 22°51′22″N 88°13′00″E.

== Demographics ==
As per 2011 Census of India Anandanagar had a total population of 3,915 of which 1,916 (49%) were males and 1,999 (51%) were females. Population below 6 years was 288. The total number of literates in Anandanagar was 3,117 (85.94% of the population over 6 years).

Anandanagar had a population of 3,963 in the 2001 census.

== Education ==
=== High schools ===
- Anandanagar A.C.Roy High School (Institution Code 17023) (Bengali medium)
- Anandanagar Ramanath High school (Index code G4-002) (Bengali medium)

=== English Medium Schools ===
There are two English medium schools in Anandanagar:

- Anandanagar Kishalay School
- Icon English Medium School

=== Primary schools ===
There are five primary schools in Anandanagar:

- Anandanagar Shibtala Primary School
- Anandanagar Bramhin Para Primary School
- Anandanagar North Primary School
- Anandanagar Hamangini Primary School
- Khosalpure Primary School

== Health ==
There is a central government hospital 'Anandanagar Union Health Center & Rural Training Unit' under Singur unit. It has all necessary primary facilities, six-bed capacity (maternity ward), outdoor facilities for general patients.

== Roads and transportation ==
The main road is 'Anandanagar Link Road' (length 2.7 km, width 5 m). It is the main artery of the village and is connected to the SH 2 via Chandannagar-Nasibpur road. Another road renovated under 'Pradhan Mantri Gram Sadak Yojana' connects Kaliwada and Singur via Rajarbathan, Boinchipota, Anandanagar, Ratanpur.

There is Auto & Trecker service to Singur, Chandannagar and Kamarkundu. The nearest railway stations are Singur railway station and Nasibpur railway station on the Howrah-Tarakeshwar section.

== Politics ==
The current Panchayat Prodhan from Anandanagar Panchayat is Prasanta Boital of AITC, who won the seat in Panchayat elections of 2023. Profulla Pore of AITC won this seat in 2003 and Prem Prasad Adhikari of AITC won this seat in 1998.
