= Chandannagar subdivision =

Chandannagore subdivision
- Subdivision
- Interactive map of Chandannagore subdivision
- Coordinates: 22.87°N 88.38°E
- Country: India
- State: West Bengal
- District: Hooghly
- Headquarters: Chandannagar

Area
  - Total: 508.08 km^{2} (196.17 sq mi)

Population (2011)
  - Total: 1,127,176
  - Density: 2,218.5/km^{2} (5,745.9/sq mi)

Languages
  - Official: Bengali, English
- Time zone: UTC+5:30 (IST)
- ISO 3166 code: IN-WB
- Vehicle registration: WB
- Website: wb.gov.in

Chandannagore subdivision is an administrative subdivision of the Hooghly district in the state of West Bengal, India.

== Overview ==
A major portion of Chandannagore subdivision is part of the Hooghly-Damodar Plain, the agriculturally rich alluvial plains lying between the two rivers. The narrow strip of land along the Hooghly is part of the Hooghly Flats. The entire area is a part of the Gangetic Delta. The Hooghly is a tidal river and has a high west bank. The Portuguese, the Dutch, the French, the Danes and the British dominated industry, trade and commerce in this area for more than two centuries, and as a result the Hooghly Flats is highly industrialised.

== Subdivisions ==
The Hooghly district is divided into the following administrative subdivisions:

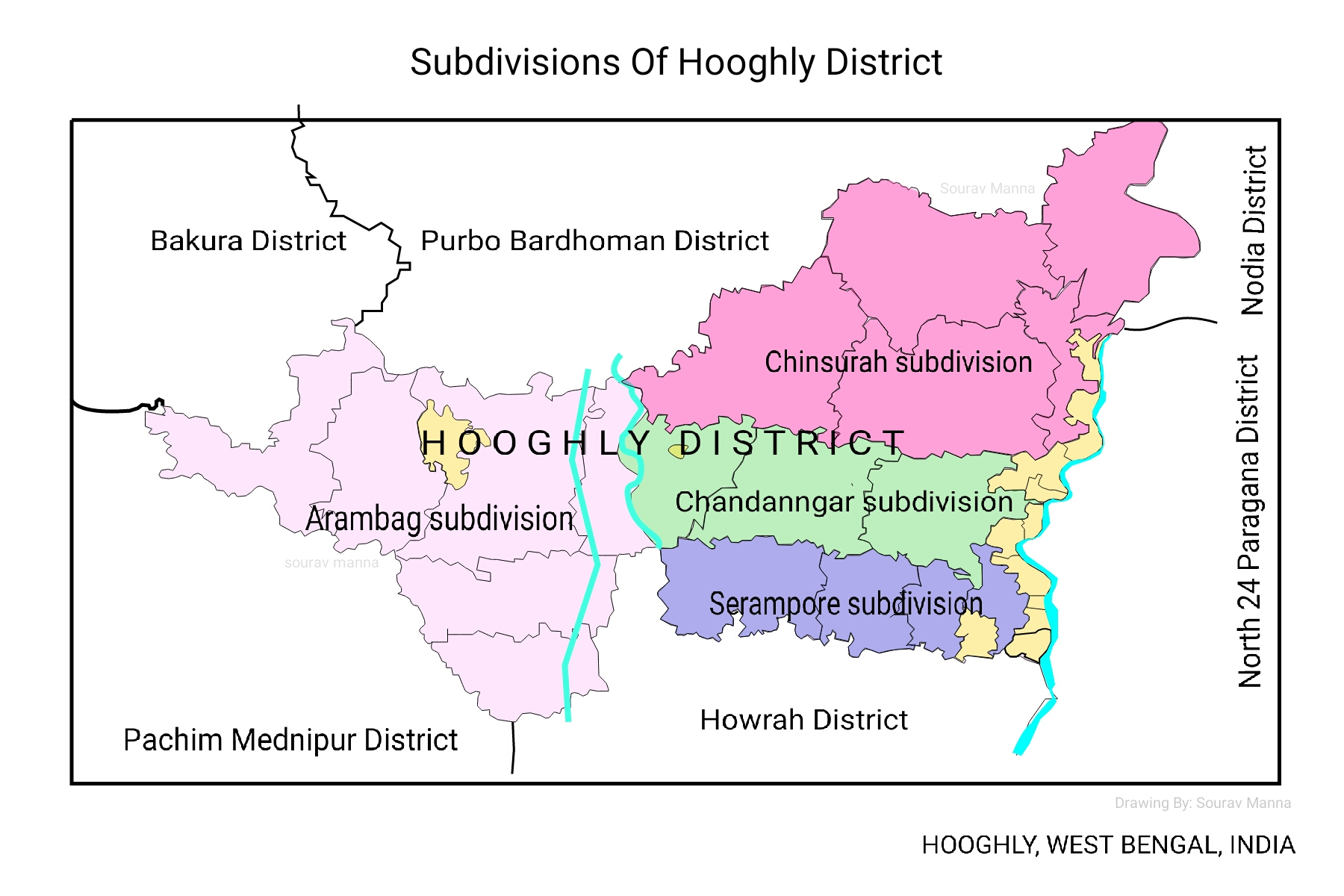

Subdivision	Headquarters	Area km^{2}	Population (2011)	Rural population % (2011)	Urban population % (2011)
Chinsurah	Hugli-Chuchura	1,148.15	1,657,518	68.63	31.37
Chandannagore	Chandannagar	508.08	1,127,176	58.52	41.48
Srirampore	Serampore	422.45	1,469,849	26.88	73.12
Arambag	Arambag	1,058.87	1,264,602	94.77	5.23
Hooghly district	Chinsurah	3,149.00	5,519,145	61.43	38.57

== Administrative units ==

Chandannagore subdivision has 5 police stations, 3 community development blocks, 3 panchayat samitis, 41 gram panchayats, 352 mouzas, 339 inhabited villages, 1 municipal corporation, 3 municipalities and 7 census towns. The single municipal corporation is Chandernagore Municipal Corporation. The municipalities are Tarakeswar Municipality, Bhadreswar Municipality and Champdany Municipality. The census towns are: Bargachhia, Balarambati, Singur, Nasibpur, Jagatnagar, Baruipara and Borai. The subdivision has its headquarters at Chandannagar.

Cities and towns in the Chandannagore subdivision and Polba Dadpur and Dhaniakhali CD Blocks of Chinsurah subdivision in Hooghly district
M: municipal corporation/ municipal city/ town, CT: census town, R: rural/ urban centre,
Owing to space constraints in the small map, the actual locations in a larger map may vary slightly

== Kolkata Urban Agglomeration ==
The following Municipal Corporation and Municipalities in Chandannagore subdivision were part of Kolkata Urban Agglomeration in the 2011 census: Chandannagar (M Corp.), Bhadreswar (M) and Champdani (M).

== Police stations ==
Police stations in Chandannagore subdivision have the following features and jurisdiction:

Police station	Area covered km^{2}	Municipal town	CD Block
Tarakeswar	n/a	Tarakeswar	Tarakeswar
Haripal	n/a	-	Haripal
Singur	n/a	-	Singur
Bhadreswar	n/a	Bhadreswar, Champdani, Chandannagar (partly)	Singur
Chandannagar	n/a	Chandannagar	-

== Blocks ==
Community development blocks in Chandannagore subdivision are:

CD Block	Headquarters	Area km^{2}	Population (2011)	SC %	ST %	Hindus %	Muslims %	Literacy rate %	Census Towns
Tarakeswar	Tarakeswar	119.93	179,148	23.63	5.04	88.94	10.20	79.96	-
Haripal	Khamarchandi	184.42	261,073	28.03	6.70	78.42	20.39	78.59	1
Singur	Singur	164.85	276,413	17.02	1.47	90.72	8.92	84.07	6

=== Blocks Map ===
Map of Haripal CD Block.

Map of Singur CD Block.

Map of Tarokeswr CD Block.

== Gram panchayats ==
The subdivision contains 41 gram panchayats under 3 community development blocks:

- Haripal block consists of 15 gram panchayats, viz. Alipur Kashipur, Haripal Kingkarbati, Nalikul Purba, Pyantra, Bandipur, Haripal Sahadev, Narayanpur Bahirkhanda, Sripatipur Ilipur, Chandanpur, Jejur, Dwarhatta, Kaikala, Paschim Gopinathpur, Haripal Ashutosh and Nalikul Paschim.
- Singur block consists of 16 gram panchayats, viz. Anandanagar, Basubati, Gopalnagar, Singur–I, Bagdanga Chinamore, Beraberi, Kamarkundu Gopalnagar Daluigachha, Singur–II, Bainchipota, Bighati, Mirzapur Bankipur, Balarambati, Bora, Baruipara Paltagarh, Borai Pahalampur and Nasibpur.
- Tarakeswar block consists of ten gram panchayats, viz. Ashtara Dattapur, Bhanjipur, Naita Malpaharpur, Talpur, Baligori–I, Champadanga, Purba Ramnagar, Baligori–II, Kesabchak and Santoshpur.

== Economy ==
=== Industry ===
Chandannagore subdivision has five jute mills – Northbrook Jute Mill, Dalhousie Jute Mill, Angus Jute Works (all at Champdani under Bhadreswar police station), Victoria Jute Mill (at Telinipara) and Gondalpara Jute Works (at Gondalpara) – all along the Hooghly. Jute mills drew in a large labour force from the neighbouring states of Bihar and Orissa, as well as eastern Uttar Pradesh, quite often forming an overwhelming majority of the population in the area, living in shanty towns and slums dotting the mill area. The proportion of migrants in the population was 80% in Bhadreswar. The entire jute industry is in a bad shape.

See also – Victoria Jute Mill, a part of Indian heritage

Amongst the other well-known industrial units in Chandannagore subdivision are: Lagan Engineering and Braithwaite. Lagan Engineering is a jute machinery manufacturing company set up in 1955 in Angus in Champdani. The machinery it has manufactured has been functioning well in numerous jute mills. It has been modernising to keep abreast with the latest technological developments. It was initially set up by the Northern Ireland-based-James Mackie & Sons, run for a short period by the Government of India, which subsequently divested its shares to Murlidhar Ratanlal Exports Ltd. Braithwaite's Angus Works was set up at Champdani in 1960 for manufacturing cranes, foundry products and machinery components etc. In 2010, the administrative control of Braithwaite & Co. was taken over by the Ministry of Railways.

Singur gained international media attention since Tata Motors started constructing a factory to manufacture their $2,500 car, the Tata Nano at Singur. The small car was scheduled to roll out of the factory by 2008. In October 2008 Tatas announced withdrawal from the project. In 2016, the Supreme Court quashed the West Bengal government's acquisition of 997 acres of agricultural land for Tata Motors and ordered its return to 9,117 landowners.

=== Handloom weaving ===
The handloom sarees of Dhaniakhali, Begampur, Jangipara, Rajbalhat areas and dhutis of Haripal, Rajbalhat, Khanakul areas of Hooghly district are widely familiar.

=== Agriculture ===
Hooghly is an agriculturally prosperous district of West Bengal. Although the economy has been shifting away from agriculture, it is still the pre-dominant economic activity and the main source of livelihood for the rural people of the district. One third of the district income comes from agriculture. Given below is an overview of the agricultural production (all data in tonnes) for Chandannagore subdivision, other subdivisions and the Hooghly district, with data for the year 2013-14.

CD Block/ Subdivision	Rice	Wheat	Jute	Pulses	Oil seeds	Potatoes	Sugarcane
Tarakeswar	86,418	-	58,340	-	3,421	81,573	-
Haripal	49,443	-	24,593	-	1,965	173,968	-
Singur	53,930	12	53,343	-	1,136	58,151	-
Chandannagore subdivision	189,791	12	136,276	-	6,522	313,692	-
Chinsurah subdivision	235,561	92	111,218	4	10,362	812,808	162
Srirampore subdivision	126,852	11	39,820	12	8,058	436,111	2,437
Arambag subdivision	255,011	75	134,541	30	19,477	514,903	123,934
Hooghly district	807,215	190	421,855	46	44,419	2,077,514	126,533

=== Poverty ===
The information given above leads us on to a comment in the District Human Development Report for Hooghly district: In the sub-division wise comparison of the levels of poverty in Hooghly district, Srirampur and Chandannagore share the lowest incidence of poverty.

== Education ==
Hooghly district had a literacy rate of 81.80% as per the provisional figures of the census of India 2011. Chinsurah subdivision had a literacy rate of 79.17%, Chandannagore subdivision 83.01%, Srirampore subdivision 86.13% and Arambag subdivision 79.05.

Given in the table below (data in numbers) is a comprehensive picture of the education scenario in Hooghly district for the year 2013-14:

Subdivision	Primary School		Middle School		High School		Higher Secondary School		General College, Univ		Technical / Professional Instt		Non-formal Education	
Subdivision	Institution	Student	Institution	Student	Institution	Student	Institution	Student	Institution	Student	Institution	Student	Institution	Student
Chinsurah	899	85,213	46	3,885	98	48,722	109	124,068	7	16,342	26	10,564	2,413	45,289
Chandannagore	606	53,382	32	3,312	46	22,000	77	89,132	6	20,450	6	778	1,297	29,127
Srirampore	577	64,207	25	3,611	65	37,997	97	108,199	8	16,631	3	793	1,337	33,060
Arambag	935	80,705	49	5,462	83	48,513	76	91,911	7	16,950	3	228	1,838	57,383
Hooghly district	3,013	283,407	152	16,270	292	157,232	359	413,310	28	70,373	38	12,363	6,885	164,859

Note: Primary schools include junior basic schools; middle schools, high schools and higher secondary schools include madrasahs; technical schools include junior technical schools, junior government polytechnics, industrial technical institutes, industrial training centres, nursing training institutes etc.; technical and professional colleges include engineering colleges, medical colleges, para-medical institutes, management colleges, teachers training and nursing training colleges, law colleges, art colleges, music colleges etc. Special and non-formal education centres include sishu siksha kendras, madhyamik siksha kendras, centres of Rabindra mukta vidyalaya, recognised Sanskrit tols, institutions for the blind and other handicapped persons, Anganwadi centres, reformatory schools etc.

The following institutions are located in Chandannagore subdivision:

- Chandernagore College, is a general degree college at Chandannagar. It was established as St. Mary's Institution in 1862, raised to a First Arts level college in 1891, renamed College Dupleix in 1901. It was closed down in 1908 and reopened in 1931. In 1945, the college section was separated from the school section and renamed College de Bussy. It was renamed Chandernagore College in 1948. Chandannagar came under Indian Union on 2 May 1950 and was integrated with the state of West Bengal on 2 October 1954. The college was directly administered by the Government of West Bengal.
- Sir J. C. Bose School of Engineering, an engineering college, established at Mankundu, Chandannagar in 2009.
- Pearl Rosary School is the most renowned school in the locality. The school is affiliated to WBBSE and WBCHSE. The school is an authorised study centre of National Institute of Open Schooling (NIOS), Govt of India.
- Tarakeswar Degree College was established at Tarakeswar in 1986.
- Vivekananda Mahavidyalaya, Haripal, a general degree college, established at Haripal in 1966.
- Singur Government College, a general degree college, was established at Singur in 2013.
- Kabi Sukanta Mahavidyalaya, a general degree college, was established at Bhadreswar in 1986.
- Rabindra Mahavidyalaya, a general degree college, was established at Champadanga in 1971.
- Khalisani Mahavidyalaya, a general degree college, as established at Khalisani, Chandannagar, in 1970.

== Healthcare ==
The table below (all data in numbers) presents an overview of the medical facilities available and patients treated in the hospitals, health centres and sub-centres in 2014 in Hooghly district.

Subdivision	Health & Family Welfare Deptt, WB				Other State Govt Deptts	Local bodies	Central Govt Deptts / PSUs	NGO / Private Nursing Homes	Total	Total Number of Beds	Total Number of Doctors*	Indoor Patients	Outdoor Patients
Subdivision	Hospitals	Rural Hospitals	Block Primary Health Centres	Primary Health Centres	Other State Govt Deptts	Local bodies	Central Govt Deptts / PSUs	NGO / Private Nursing Homes	Total	Total Number of Beds	Total Number of Doctors*	Indoor Patients	Outdoor Patients
Chinsurah	1	2	3	24	-	-	-	31	61	1,091	108	94,213	1,830,358
Chandannagore	1	3	-	8	-	-	-	41	53	828	56	70,724	1,105,060
Srirampore	3	2	2	12	-	-	-	80	99	1,894	85	63,619	1,252,941
Arambag	1	1	5	16	-	-	-	35	58	919	57	83,469	1,743,719
Hooghly district	6	8	10	60	-	-	-	187	271	4,732	306	312,025	5,932,078

.* Excluding nursing homes

Medical institutions in Chandannagore subdivision are as follows:
Hospitals: (Name, location, beds)
Chandannagar Subvisional Hospital, Chandernagore Municipal Corporation, 250 beds
Rupali Nandi Cancer Research Centre, Chandernagore Municipal Corporation, 30 beds
Gourhati ESI Hospital, Champdany Municipality, 216 beds

Rural Hospitals: (Name, block, location, beds)
Tarakeswar Rural Hospital, Tarakeswar CD Block, Tarakeswar, 60 beds
Haripal Rural Hospital, Haripal CD Block, PO Khamarchandi, 30 beds
Singur Rural Hospital, Singur CD Block, Singur, 60 beds

Primary Health Centres: (CD Block-wise)(CD Block, PHC location, beds)
Tarakeswar CD Block: Duttapur (4 beds), Talpur (10 beds).
Haripal CD Block: Bandipur (10 beds), Olipur (6 beds), Chapsara, Hurat (6 beds).
Singur CD Block: Bajemelia, PO Gopalnagar (10 beds), Balarambati (10 beds), Bora (10 beds).

Private Hospitals:* (Name, location, beds)
Bhadreswar Municipal Hospital, Telenipara, Bhadreswar, 100 beds
.* Excluding nursing homes

== Electoral constituencies ==
Lok Sabha (parliamentary) and Vidhan Sabha (state assembly) constituencies in Chandannagore subdivision were as follows:

Lok Sabha constituency	Reservation	Vidhan Sabha constituency	Reservation	CD Block and/or Gram panchayats and/or municipal areas
Hooghly	None	Singur	None	Anandanagore, Bagdanga Chinamore, Baruipara Paltagarh, Beraberi, Bighati, Bouichipota, Bora, Borai Pahalampur, Gopalnagore, Mirzapur-Bankipur, Nasibpur, Singur I and Singur II gram panchayats of Singur community development block and Begampur, Kapasaria and Panchghara gram panchayats of Chanditala II CD Block
-	-	Chandannagar	None	Chandannagar municipal corporation and Bhadreswar municipality
-	-	Other five assembly segments in Chinsurah subdivision	-	-
Arambagh	Reserved for SC	Haripal	None	Haripal CD Block and Balarambati, Basubati and Kamarkundu Gopalnagar, Daluigachha GPs of Singur CD Block
-	-	Tarakeswar	None	Tarakeswar municipality, Tarakeswar CD Block, and Bhanderhati I, Bhanderhati II, Gopinathpur I, Gopinathpur II and Perambua Sahabazar GPs of Dhaniakhali CD Block
-	-	Other four assembly segments in Arambagh subdivision and one assembly segment in Paschim Medinipur district	-	-
