= Diara railway station =

Railway Station in West Bengal, India

Diara

General information
- Location: State Highway 2, Diara, Hooghly district, West Bengal; India
- Coordinates: 22°47′54″N 88°16′53″E
- Elevation: 14 metres (46 ft)
- System: Kolkata Suburban Railway station
- Owner: Indian Railways
- Operator: Eastern Railway
- Line: Sheoraphuli–Tarakeswar branch line
- Platforms: 3
- Tracks: 2

Construction
- Structure type: Standard (on-ground station)
- Cycle facilities: Yes

Other information
- Status: Functioning
- Station code: DEA
- Division(s): Howrah

History
- Opened: 1885
- Electrified: 1957–58
- Former names: Tarkessur Railway Company

Services
Preceding station	Kolkata Suburban Railway	Following station
Sheoraphuli towards Howrah Junction	Eastern Line Sheoraphuli–Bishnupur branch line	Nasibpur towards Goghat
Route map
Location
- Location within West Bengal Location within India

Diara railway station is a Kolkata Suburban Railway station on the Sheoraphuli–Tarakeswar branch line of Howrah railway division of the Eastern Railway zone. It is situated beside State Highway 2 at Diara in Hooghly district in the Indian state of West Bengal.

== History ==
The Sheoraphuli–Tarakeswar branch line was opened by the Tarkessur Railway Company on 1 January 1885 and was worked by East Indian Railway Company. The Tarkessur company was taken over by the East Indian Railway in 1915. The track was first electrified with 3,000 V DC system in 1957–58. In 1967, this line including Diara railway station was electrified with to 25 kV AC system.
