= Kamarkundu =

- Village
- Location in West Bengal, India Kamarkundu (India)
- Coordinates: 22°50′N 88°12′E
- Country: India
- State: West Bengal
- District: Hooghly

Languages
  - Official: Bengali
- Time zone: UTC+5:30 (IST)
- ISO 3166 code: IN-WB
- Vehicle registration: WB
- Lok Sabha constituency: Arambagh
- Vidhan Sabha constituency: Haripal
- Website: wb.gov.in

Kamarkundu is a village in Kamarkundu Gopalnagar gram panchayat in Singur block in Chandannagore subdivision of Hooghly district in the Indian state of West Bengal.

== Geography ==
Kamarkundu is located at 22°50′N 88°12′E

This is a rich agricultural area with several cold storages.

== Economy ==
Around a total of 32 lakh people from all around the city commute to Kolkata daily for work. In the Howrah-Tarakeswar section there are 48 trains that carry commuters from 21 railway stations. In the Howrah-Bardhaman (chord line) section 48 trains carry commuters from 30 railway stations.

== Transport ==
At Kamarkundu railway station, the Sheoraphuli-Bishnupur branch line goes above the Howrah-Bardhaman chord. Since the lines are at two levels, trains cannot switch routes. Platforms are at two levels.
