= Tarakeswar (community development block) =

- Community development block

- Location in West Bengal, India
- Coordinates: 22.89°N 88.02°E
- Country: India
- State: West Bengal
- District: Hooghly

Government
  - Type: Representative democracy

Area
  - Total: 119.93 km^{2} (46.31 sq mi)
- Elevation: 16 m (52 ft)

Population (2011)
  - Total: 179,148
  - Density: 1,493.8/km^{2} (3,868.9/sq mi)

Languages
  - Official: Bengali, English
- Time zone: UTC+5:30 (IST)
- PIN: 712410 (Tarakeswar); 712401 (Champadanga)
- ISO 3166 code: IN-WB
- Vehicle registration: WB-15, WB-16, WB-18
- Literacy: 79.96%
- Lok Sabha constituency: Arambag
- Vidhan Sabha constituency: Tarakeswar
- Website: hooghly.gov.in

Tarakeshwar is a panchayat samiti (community development block) in Chandannagore subdivision of Hooghly district in the Indian state of West Bengal.

== Overview ==
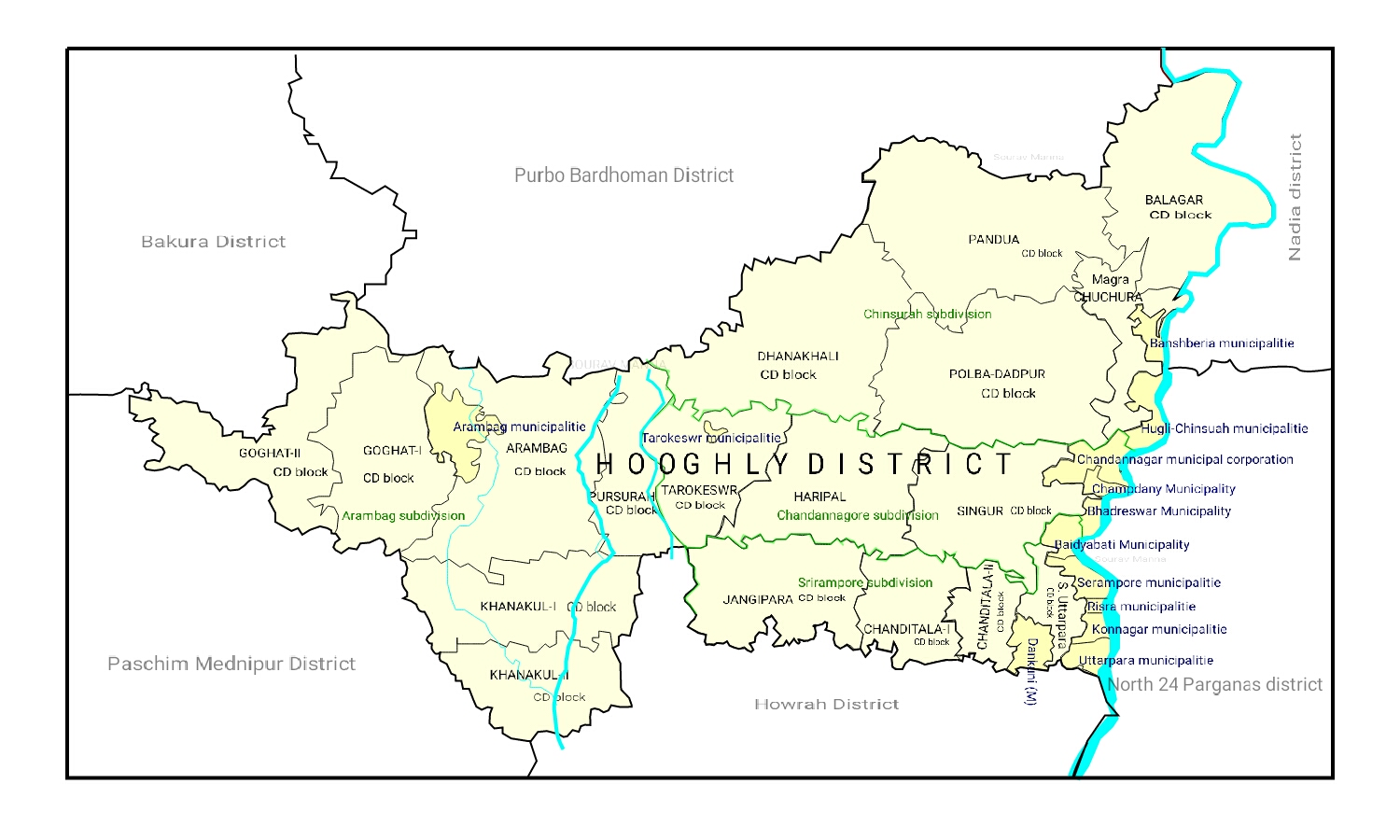
Map of Hooghly district, with CD blocks and municipal areas

Map of Tarakeswar

The CD block is part of the Hooghly-Damodar Plain, one of the district's three natural regions of flat alluvial plains which form part of the Ganges Delta. It has many depressions which receive water from tributaries of the surrounding lands during the rainy season and discharge it in smaller channels.

Tarakeshwar is bordered by Dhaniakhali CD block on the north, Haripal CD block on the east, Jangipara CD block on the south, and Pursurah CD block on the west. It is 45 kilometres (28 mi) from Chinsurah, the district headquarters. The CD block covers an area of 119.93 square kilometres (46.31 sq mi). It has 10 gram panchayats (Astara-Duttapur, Baligori I, Baligori II, Bhanjipur, Champadanga, Keshabchak, Naita-Mal Paharpur, Purba Ramnagar, Santoshpur and Talpur), 144 village councils, 90 mouzas and 89 villages. The Tarakeswar police station serves the block. Headquarters of this CD Block is at Tarakeswar.

== Demographics ==
=== Population ===
Tarakeswar had a population of 162,355 in the 2001 census, of whom 83,141 (51 percent) were males and 79,214 (49 percent) were females. Its population increased by 11.56 percent from 1991 to 2001 decade, and the district's population increased by 15.72 percent. West Bengal's population increased by 17.84 percent during the decade.

In the 2011 census, Tarakeswar's population increased to 179,148 (entirely rural). There were 91,534 males (51 percent) and 87,614 females (49 percent). The population under age six was 17,096. Scheduled Caste members numbered 42,338 (23.63 percent), and Scheduled Tribe members numbered 9,034 (5.04 percent).

Villages with a population of over 4,000 in 2011 were Santoshpur (4,063), Talpur (5,389), Moktarpur (6,364), Bhanjipur (4,433), Purba Ramnagar (7,759), Baligari (5,845), Astara (6,590) and Champadanga (12,518). Smaller villages are Keshabchak (2,569), Malpaharpur (2,116) and Duttapur (1,168).

=== Literacy ===
In 2001, Tarakeswar had a total literacy rate of 56.23 percent; male literacy was 77.61 percent, and female literacy was 54.66 percent. In 2011, the number of literate people was 129,574; males numbered 71,609, and females numbered 57,965. Gender disparity was 13.42 percent.

Literacy in CD blocks of
Hooghly district
Arambagh subdivision
Arambagh – 79.10
Khanakul I – 77.73
Khanakul II – 79.16
Goghat I – 78.70
Goghat II – 77.24
Pursurah – 82.12
Chandannagar subdivision
Haripal – 78.59
Singur – 84.01
Tarakeswar – 79.96
Chinsurah subdivision
Balagarh – 76.94
Chinsurah Mogra – 83.01
Dhaniakhali – 75.66
Pandua – 75.86
Polba Dadpur – 75.14
Srirampore subdivision
Chanditala I – 83.76
Chanditala II – 84.78
Jangipara – 75.34
Sreerampur Uttarpara – 87.33
Source: 2011 Census: CD Block Wise
Primary Census Abstract Data

=== Language and religion ===
Religion in Tarakeswar CD block (2011)
Hinduism	88.94%
Islam	10.20%
Other (tribal religion)	0.67%
Other or not stated	0.19%

As per the 2011 census, majority of the population of the district belong to the Hindu community with a population share of 82.9% followed by Muslims at 15.8%. The percentage of the Hindu population of the district has followed a decreasing trend from 87.1% in 1961 to 82.9% in the latest census 2011. On the other hand, the percentage of Muslim population has increased from 12.7% in 1961 to 15.8% in 2011 census.

In 2011 census Hindus numbered 159,330 and formed 88.94% of the population in Tarakeswar numbered 18,274 and formed 10.20% of the population. Others numbered 1,544 and formed 0.86% of the population.

Languages of Tarakeshwar block (2011)
1. Bengali (96.9%)
2. Santali (2.26%)
3. Others (0.81%)

At the time of the 2011 census, 96.93% of the population spoke Bengali and 2.26% Santali as their first language.

== Economy ==
=== Rural poverty ===
According to estimates obtained from a survey of families living Below Poverty Line in 2005, rural poverty in Tarakeswar was 18.62 percent.

=== Employment ===
Employment in Tarakeswar
1. Farmers (19.6%)
2. Agricultural labourers (38.1%)
3. Household industries (5.19%)
4. Other workers (37.2%)

In 2011, farmers were 19.55 percent of the workforce; agricultural laborers were 38.09 percent, household-industry workers 5.19 percent and other workers 37.17 percent.

=== Infrastructure ===
Tarakeswar has 89 villages, all with electricity. Forty-one villages have more than one source of drinking water (a tap, well, tube well, or hand pump); seven villages have only a tube (or bore well), and 36 have only a hand pump. Eight villages have post offices, 14 have sub-post offices and three have post-and-telegraph offices. Sixty-three villages have landlines, 58 have public call offices, and 82 have mobile-phone coverage. Forty-six villages have roads, and 29 have bus service. Eighteen villages have agricultural credit societies, eight have commercial or co-operative banks, and one village has a bank ATM.

=== Agriculture ===
The agricultural area has several cold-storage facilities. Although rice is the district's main crop, potatoes, jute, vegetables and fruits are also grown.

Land reform has changed patterns of land ownership. In 2013-14, people engaged in agriculture in Tarakeswar consisted of bargadars (10.17 percent), patta (deed) holders (4.73 percent), small farmers—owning 1–2 hectares (2.5–4.9 acres)—8.24 percent, marginal farmers—less than 1 hectare (2.5 acres)—35.20 percent, and agricultural labourers 41.65 percent. Tarakeswar has markets in Baliguri, Champadanga, Santoshpur and Kararia.

The CD block had 95 fertiliser depots, 38 seed stores and 47 fair-price shops in 2013-14. It produced oil seeds, 81,189 tonnes of Aman paddy (the main winter crop) from 27,792 hectares (68,680 acres), 5,229 tonnes of Boro paddy (a spring crop) from 1,668 hectares (4,120 acres), 58,340 tonnes of jute from 2,730 hectares (6,700 acres), and 81,573 tonnes of potatoes from 5,105 hectares (12,610 acres). The total irrigated area was 11,828 hectares (29,230 acres); of this, 7,125 hectares (17,610 acres) were irrigated by canal water, 1,780 hectares (4,400 acres) by tank water, 50 hectares (120 acres) by river lift irrigation, 480 hectares (1,200 acres) by deep tube wells, and 2,393 hectares (5,910 acres) by shallow tube wells.

=== Banking ===
In 2013-14, Tarakeswar 10 commercial-bank offices and one Regional Rural Bank.

== Transport ==
The block has 27 bus routes. The broad-gauge Sheoraphuli–Tarakeswar branch line was opened by the Tarkessur Railway Company on 1 January 1885, and was operated by the East Indian Railway Company.

A Tarakeswar-Bishnupur project was authorised in 1999-2000, and Eastern Railway provided details about the project in 2003. The proposed fully-electrified line was divided into three parts: Tarakeswar-Arambagh—26 kilometres (16 mi), Arambagh-Kodabari—16 kilometres (9.9 mi), and Kodabari-Bishnupur—44 kilometres (27 mi). It will be part of the Kolkata Suburban Railway system. State Highway 2 (running from Bankura to Malancha in North 24 Parganas district) and State Highway 15, running from Dainhat (in Purba Bardhaman district) to Gadiara (in Howrah district), pass through the block.

== Education ==
In 2013-14, Tarakeswar had 114 primary schools with 8,958 students; 10 middle schools, with 737 students; seven high schools, with 3,491 students, and 10 higher secondary schools, with 12,692 students. It had one college with 3,255 students, and 291 institutions for special and non-formal education with 7,846 students. Rabindra Mahavidyalaya, a college, was founded in Champadanga in 1971. Of Tarakeswar's 89 villages, two had no school; 30 had more than one primary school, 66 had at least one primary school, 21 had at least one primary and one middle school, and 15 had at least one middle and one secondary school.

== Healthcare and groundwater ==
Tarakeswar had one rural hospital, two primary health centres and three private nursing homes with a total 105 beds and eight doctors in 2014. It had 31 family welfare sub-centers; all treated 21,028 patients indoors and 215,593 outdoors. Tarakeswar Rural Hospital, in Tarakeswar, had 60 beds; Duttapur Primary Health Centre had four beds, and Talpur PHC had ten.

The block has a low arsenic contamination of groundwater. The WHO guideline for arsenic in drinking water is 10 mg per litre, and the Indian standard is 50 mg. Sixteen blocks in Hooghly district have arsenic levels above WHO guidelines, and 11 have levels above the Indian standard. Tarakeswar's maximum concentration is 37 mg per litre.

== See also ==
- List of West Bengal districts ranked by literacy rate
