= Bajemelia =

- Village
- Location in West Bengal, India Bajemelia (India)
- Coordinates: 22°50′40″N 88°12′26″E
- Country: India
- State: West Bengal
- District: Hooghly

Population (2011)
  - Total: 3,659

Languages
  - Official: Bengali, English
- Time zone: UTC+5:30 (IST)
- ISO 3166 code: IN-WB

Bajemelia is a village in Singur CD Block in Chandannagore subdivision of Hooghly district in the Indian state of West Bengal.

== Geography ==
Bajemelia is located at 22°50′40″N 88°12′26″E.

== Demographics ==
As per the 2011 Census of India Bajemelia had a population of 3,659 of which 1,904 (52%) were males and 1,755 (48%) females. Population below 6 years was 299. The total number of literates in Bajemelia was 2,905 (86.46% of the population over 6 years).

== Economy ==
=== Tata Motors at Singur ===
Singur gained international media attention since Tata Motors started constructing a factory to manufacture their $2,500 car, the Tata Nano at Singur. The small car was scheduled to roll out of the factory by 2008. In October 2008 Tatas announced withdrawal from the project. Six villages – Bajemelia, Beraberi, Gopalnagar, Joymolla, Khaser Bheri and Sinher Bheri – were affected by land acquisition. In 2016, the Supreme Court quashed the West Bengal government's acquisition of 997 acres of agricultural land for Tata Motors and ordered its return to 9,117 landowners.

== Healthcare ==
There is a primary health centre (with 10 beds) at Bajemelia.

== Transport ==
Kamarkundu railway station is the nearest railway station.
