= Balarambati railway station =

Railway Station in West Bengal, India

Balarambati

General information
- Location: Balarambati, Singur, Hooghly, West Bengal; India
- Coordinates: 22°48′29″N 88°12′42″E
- Elevation: 16 metres (52 ft)
- System: Kolkata Suburban Railway
- Owner: Indian Railways
- Operator: Eastern Railway zone
- Line: Howrah–Bardhaman chord
- Platforms: 4

Construction
- Structure type: Standard (on ground station)
- Parking: No
- Cycle facilities: Yes

Other information
- Status: Functioning
- Station code: BLAE
- Zone(s): Eastern Railway zone
- Division(s): Howrah

History
- Opened: 1917; 109 years ago
- Electrified: 1964–66
- Former names: East Indian Railway Company

Services
| Preceding station | Kolkata Suburban Railway | Following station |
|---|---|---|
| Mirzapur-Bankipur towards Howrah Junction | Eastern Line Chord line | Kamarkundu towards Barddhaman Junction |
Route map
Location
- Location within West Bengal Location within India

Balarambati railway station is on the Howrah–Bardhaman chord and is located in Hooghly district in the Indian state of West Bengal. The station is 32 kilometres (20 mi) from Howrah on the Howrah–Bardhaman chord line and is part of the Kolkata Suburban Railway system.
