= Mirzapur-Bankipur railway station =

Railway station in West Bengal, India

Mirzapur-Bankipur

General information
- Location: Mirzapur-Bankipur, Hooghly, West Bengal; India
- Coordinates: 22°47′27″N 88°13′20″E
- Elevation: 15 metres (49 ft)
- System: Kolkata Suburban Railway station
- Owner: Indian Railways
- Operator: Eastern Railway zone
- Line: Howrah–Bardhaman chord
- Platforms: 3

Construction
- Structure type: Standard (on ground station)
- Parking: No
- Cycle facilities: Yes

Other information
- Status: Functioning
- Station code: MBE
- Zone(s): Eastern Railway zone
- Division(s): Howrah

History
- Opened: 1917; 109 years ago
- Electrified: 1964–66
- Former names: East Indian Railway Company

Services
Preceding station	Kolkata Suburban Railway	Following station
Baruipara towards Howrah Junction	Eastern Line Chord line	Balarambati towards Barddhaman Junction
Route map
Location
- Location within West Bengal Location within India

Mirzapur-Bankipur station is in Hooghly district in the Indian state of West Bengal. It is 30 kilometres (19 mi) from Howrah and is part of the Kolkata Suburban Railway system.
