= Beraberi =

- Village
- Location in West Bengal, India Beraberi (India)
- Coordinates: 22°50′46″N 88°12′17″E
- Country: India
- State: West Bengal
- District: Hooghly

Population (2011)
  - Total: 6,810

Languages
  - Official: Bengali, English
- Time zone: UTC+5:30 (IST)
- ISO 3166 code: IN-WB

Beraberi is a village in Singur CD Block in Hooghly district in the Indian state of West Bengal.

== Geography ==
Beraberi is located at 22°50′46″N 88°12′17″E.

== Demographics ==
As per the 2011 Census of India Beraberi had a population of 6,810 of which 3,454 (51%) were males and 3,356 (49%) females. Population below 6 years was 644. The number of literates in Beraberi was 5,173 (83.90% of the population over 6 years).

== Economy ==
=== Tata Motors at Singur ===
Singur gained international media attention since Tata Motors started constructing a factory to manufacture their $2,500 car, the Tata Nano at Singur. The small car was scheduled to roll out of the factory by 2008. In October 2008, Tatas announced withdrawal from the project. Six villages – Bajemelia, Beraberi, Gopalnagar, Joymolla, Khaser Bheri and Sinher Bheri – were affected by land acquisition. In 2016, the Supreme Court quashed the West Bengal government's acquisition of 997 acres of agricultural land for Tata Motors and ordered its return to 9,117 landowners.

== Education ==
Beraberi Suryya Narayan Memorial High School is a coeducational higher secondary school. It has arrangements for teaching Bengali, English, Sanskrit, history, geography, economics, mathematics, physics and chemistry.

== Transport ==
Madhusudanpur railway station on Howrah-Bardhaman chord line is the nearest railway station.
