= Gopalnagar =

Gopal Nagar
- Village
- Location in West Bengal, India Gopal Nagar (India)
- Coordinates: 22°49′44″N 88°12′50″E
- Country: India
- State: West Bengal
- District: Hooghly

Population (2011)
  - Total: 12,232

Languages
  - Official: Bengali, English
- Time zone: UTC+5:30 (IST)
- ISO 3166 code: IN-WB
- Website: http://www.gopalnagar.info

Gopalnagar is a village in Singur CD Block in Hooghly district in the state West Bengal, India.

== Geography ==
Gopalnagar is located at 22°49′44″N 88°12′50″E.

== Demographics ==
As per the 2011 Census of India Gopalnagar had a population of 12,232 of which 6,278 (51%) were males and 5,954 (49%) females. Population below 6 years was 933. The number of literates in Gopalnagar was 9,901 (87.63% of the population over 6 years).

== Economy ==
=== Tata Motors at Singur ===
Singur gained international media attention since Tata Motors started constructing a factory to manufacture their $2,500 car, the Tata Nano at Singur. The small car was scheduled to roll out of the factory by 2008. In October 2008 Tatas announced withdrawal from the project. Six villages – Bajemelia, Beraberi, Gopalnagar, Joymolla, Khaser Bheri and Sinher Bheri – were affected by land acquisition. In 2016, the Supreme Court quashed the West Bengal government’s acquisition of 997 acres of agricultural land for Tata Motors and ordered its return to 9,117 landowners.

== Education ==
Gopalnagar High School is a coeducational higher secondary school, established in 1962 at PO Gopalnagar Harharia. It has arrangements for teaching Bengali, English, history, geography, political science, economics and mathematics.

== Transport ==
Singur railway station is the nearest railway station.
