= Singur railway station =

Railway station in West Bengal, India

Singur

General information
- Location: State Highway 2, Burasanti, Singur, Hooghly district, West Bengal; India
- Coordinates: 22°48′53″N 88°13′40″E
- Elevation: 14 metres (46 ft)
- System: Kolkata Suburban Railway station
- Owner: Indian Railways
- Operator: Eastern Railway
- Line: Sheoraphuli–Tarakeswar branch line
- Platforms: 3
- Tracks: 2

Construction
- Structure type: Standard (on-ground station)
- Cycle facilities: Yes

Other information
- Status: Functioning
- Station code: SIU
- Division(s): Howrah

History
- Opened: 1885
- Electrified: 1957–58
- Former names: Tarkessur Railway Company

Services
| Preceding station | Kolkata Suburban Railway | Following station |
|---|---|---|
| Nasibpur towards Howrah Junction | Eastern Line Sheoraphuli–Bishnupur branch line | Kamarkundu towards Goghat |
Route map
Location
- Location within West Bengal Location within India

Singur railway station is a Kolkata Suburban Railway station on the Sheoraphuli–Tarakeswar branch line of Howrah railway division of the Eastern Railway zone. It is situated beside State Highway 2, Burasanti at Singur in Hooghly district in the Indian state of West Bengal.

== History ==
The Sheoraphuli–Tarakeswar branch line was opened by the Tarkessur Railway Company on 1 January 1885 and was worked by East Indian Railway Company. The Tarkessur company was taken over by the East Indian Railway in 1915. The track was first electrified with 3,000 V DC system in 1957–58. In 1967, this line including Singur railway station was electrified with to 25 kV AC system.
