= Kamarkundu railway station =

Railway station in West Bengal, India

Kamarkundu
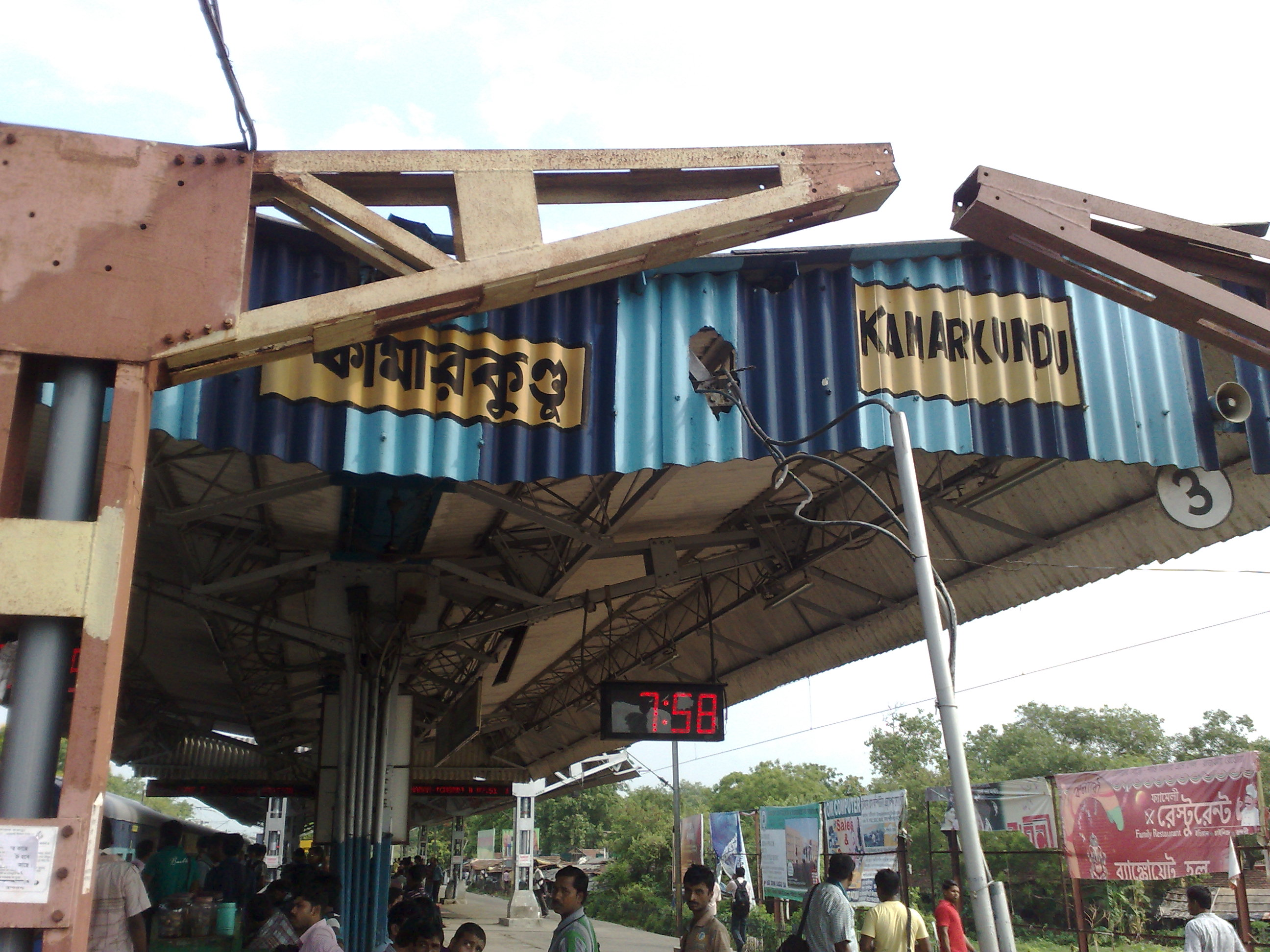

General information
- Location: Kamarkundu, Hooghly, West Bengal; India
- Coordinates: 22°49′18″N 88°12′17″E
- Elevation: 13 metres (43 ft)
- System: Kolkata Suburban Railway junction station
- Owner: Indian Railways
- Operator: Eastern Railway
- Lines: Howrah–Bardhaman chord Sheoraphuli–Bishnupur branch line
- Platforms: 5+2

Construction
- Structure type: At-grade (for Bardhaman chord); Elevated (for Bishnupur branch)
- Parking: Available
- Cycle facilities: Available

Other information
- Status: Functioning
- Station code: KQU
- Division(s): Howrah

History
- Opened: 1885
- Electrified: 1957–1958
- Former names: East Indian Railway Company

Services
Preceding station	Kolkata Suburban Railway	Following station
Balarambati towards Howrah Junction	Eastern Line Chord line	Madhusudanpur towards Barddhaman Junction
Singur towards Howrah Junction	Eastern Line Sheoraphuli–Bishnupur branch line	Nalikul towards Goghat
Route map
Location
- Location within West Bengal Location within India

Kamarkundu is a railway station at the crossing of the Howrah–Bishnupur and the Howrah–Bardhaman chord lines. It serves Kamarkundu in Hooghly district in the Indian state of West Bengal.

== Overview ==
This is a rich agricultural area with several cold storages.

== History ==
The Howrah–Tarakeswar line was opened in 1885 and the Howrah–Bardhaman chord line in 1917. It is part of Kolkata Suburban Railway system. It is 33 kilometres (21 mi) from Howrah via Howrah–Bardhaman chord and 36 kilometres (22 mi) via Howrah–Tarakeswar branch line.

== Station oddity ==
At Kamarkundu, the Sheoraphuli–Bishnupur branch line goes above the Howrah–Bardhaman chord. Since the lines are at two levels, trains cannot switch routes. Platforms are at two levels.

== Major trains ==
- Sealdah - Alipurduar Kanchan Kanya Express
- Howrah–Rampurhat Express
- Kolkata–Jammu Tawi Express
