= Tarakeswar Municipality =

Type
- Type: Municipality

History
- Founded: 1975; 51 years ago

Leadership
- Chairman: Uttam Kundu, AITC
- Vice Chairman: Prabir Chandra, AITC

Structure
- Seats: 15
- Political groups: Government (15): AITC (15)

Elections
- Last election: 2022
- Next election: 2027

Website
- www.tarakeswarmunicipality.in

Tarakeswar Municipality is the civic body that governs Tarakeswar and its surrounding areas in the Chandannagore subdivision of Hooghly district, West Bengal, India.

== History ==
Tarakeswar Municipality was established in 1975.

== Geography ==
Tarakeswar Municipality covers an area of 3.88 km^{2} and has a total population of 31,344 (2011). Tarakeswar Municipality is bounded by Bhanjipur gram panchayat on the north, Baligori I gram panchayat on the east, Ramnagar gram panchayat on the south and Sontoshpur gram panchayat on the west. It is located in the centre of Tarakeswar CD Block.

== Elections ==
In the 2015 municipal elections for Tarakeswar Municipality Trinamool Congress won all the 15 seats.

In the 2010 municipal elections for Tarakeswar Municipality Trinamool Congress won 10 seats and CPI (M) 5 seats.

About the 2010 municipal elections, The Guardian wrote, "Today's municipal elections are unlike any for decades: the Communists, who have held West Bengal's main towns almost without a break since the 1970s, are facing disaster… This time defeat is likely to be definitive and could signal the beginning of the end for the Communist Party of India-Marxist (CPIM)."

In the 2005 municipal elections for Tarakeswar Municipality, CPI (M) won 11 seats and Marxist Forward Bloc 4 seats.
