= Champdani Municipality =

Civic body of Champdani, West Bengal, India

Type
- Type: Municipality

History
- Founded: 1917; 109 years ago

Leadership
- Chairman: Suresh Mishra, AITC
- Vice Chairman: Vinay Kumar, AITC

Structure
- Seats: 22
- Political groups: Government (11): AITC (11); Opposition (1): INC (1); Others (10): IND (10)

Elections
- Last election: 2022
- Next election: 2027

Website
- www.champdanymunicipality.org

Champdani Municipality is the civic body that governs Champdani and its surrounding areas in Chandannagore subdivision of Hooghly district, West Bengal, India.

== History ==
Champdany Municipality was established in 1917.

== Geography ==
Champdany Municipality covers an area of 6.59 sq km and has a total population of 111,251 (2011).

Champdany Municipality is bounded by Bhadreswar Municipality on the north, Hooghly River on the east, Baidyabati Municipality on the south and Singur (community development block) on the west.

In 1981, 31.92% of the total population formed main workers and 68.08% were non-workers in Champdany Municipality and 78.69% of the total main workers were industrial workers. This may be interpreted as follows: although industrial activities are prominent in the municipal areas of the region, the major portion of the population is commuters and migrants find employment in the area.

== Education ==
There are 26 primary, 10 secondary and 12 higher secondary schools (all including municipal schools) in Champdani municipal area. There are a number of schools with facilities for teaching in the Hindi-medium, as for example Champdani Ram Dulari Hindi High School, Jai Hind Hindi School, Angus Hindi Junior High School, Angus Khanpukur Hindi Primary School, Saraswati Sishu Vidyamandir etc. Amongst the Urdu-medium schools are: The Adabi Society High Madrasa, Moulana Abdul Wali School, Champdani BISS Free Primary School, Anees Academy SSK Urdu, Champdani Urdu Girls’ Junior High, Haji Shakur Memorial Primary School, Iqra Model Academy SSK, Mujahid-e-Millat etc. Chamdani Odia GSFP School teaches in the Odiya-medium. There also are Bengali and English medium schools.

== Healthcare ==
Gourhati ESI Hospital, with 216 beds, is located in the Champdany Municipality area.

== Elections ==
In the 2015 municipal elections for Champdany Municipality Trinamool Congress won 13 seats, CPI (M) 1 seat, Congress 2 seats, BJP 2 seats and Independents 4 seats.

In the 2010 municipal elections for Champdany Municipality Trinamool Congress won 11 seats, CPI (M) 4 seats, Congress 3 seats, and Independents 4 seats.

About the 2010 municipal elections, The Guardian wrote, "Today's municipal elections are unlike any for decades: the Communists, who have held West Bengal's main towns almost without a break since the 1970s, are facing disaster… This time defeat is likely to be definitive and could signal the beginning of the end for the Communist Party of India-Marxist (CPIM)."

In the 2005 municipal elections for Champdany Municipality, CPI (M) won 4 seats, CPI 2 seats, Congress 2 seats, Trinamool Congress 6 seats and others 8 seats.
