= Chandernagore Municipal Corporation =

Local civic body in Chandernagore, West Bengal, India

Chandannagore Municipal Corporation

Type
- Type: Municipal Corporation

History
- Founded: 1994; 32 years ago

Leadership
- Mayor: Vacant since 30 May 2026
- Deputy Mayor: Vacant since 30 May 2026

Structure
- Seats: 33
- Political groups: Dissolved

Elections
- Last election: 2022
- Next election: 2027

Meeting place
- Chandannagar, West Bengal

Website
- www.chandernagoremunicipalcorporation.in

Chandannagore Municipal Corporation (CMC) is the local government that governs the city of Chandannagar in Chandannagar Subdivision of Hooghly district, West Bengal, India.

== History ==
Chandannnagore Municipality was established in 1955, as per the Chandannagore Municipal Act, 1955 (WB Act XVIII of 1955). It became Chandannagore Municipal Corporation in 1994 as per the Chandannagore Municipal Corporation Act, 1990 (West Bengal Act XXXII of 1990). From 2006, it has been governed by the West Bengal Municipal Corporation Act, 2006 (West Bengal Act XXXIX of 2006).

There was a French trading post at Chandannagar from 1673. It became a permanent French settlement in 1688. It was a part of French India till 1950, when Government of India took over the administration of Chandannagar. It was merged with the state of West Bengal on 2 October 1954.

== Geography ==
Chandannagore Municipal Corporation covers an area of 22.03 km^{2} and has a total population of 166,771 (2011).

In 1981, 27.20% of the total population formed main workers and 72.80% were non-workers in Chandannagore Municipal Corporation and 44.77% of the total main workers were industrial workers. This may be interpreted as follows: although industrial activities are prominent in the municipal areas of the region, the major portion of the population is commuters and migrants find employment in the area.

== Healthcare ==
Chandannagar Subvisional Hospital, with 250 beds, and Rupalal Nandi Cancer Research Centre, with 30 beds, are located in the Chandannagore Municipal Corporation area.

== Current members ==
Chandannagar Municipal Corporation has a total of 33 members or councillors, who are directly elected after a term of 5 years. The council is led by the Mayor. The latest elections were held in 12 February 2022. The Corporation was dissolved after 31 councillors including the Mayor, Ram Chakraborty of the Trinamool Congress resigned on 30 May 2026.

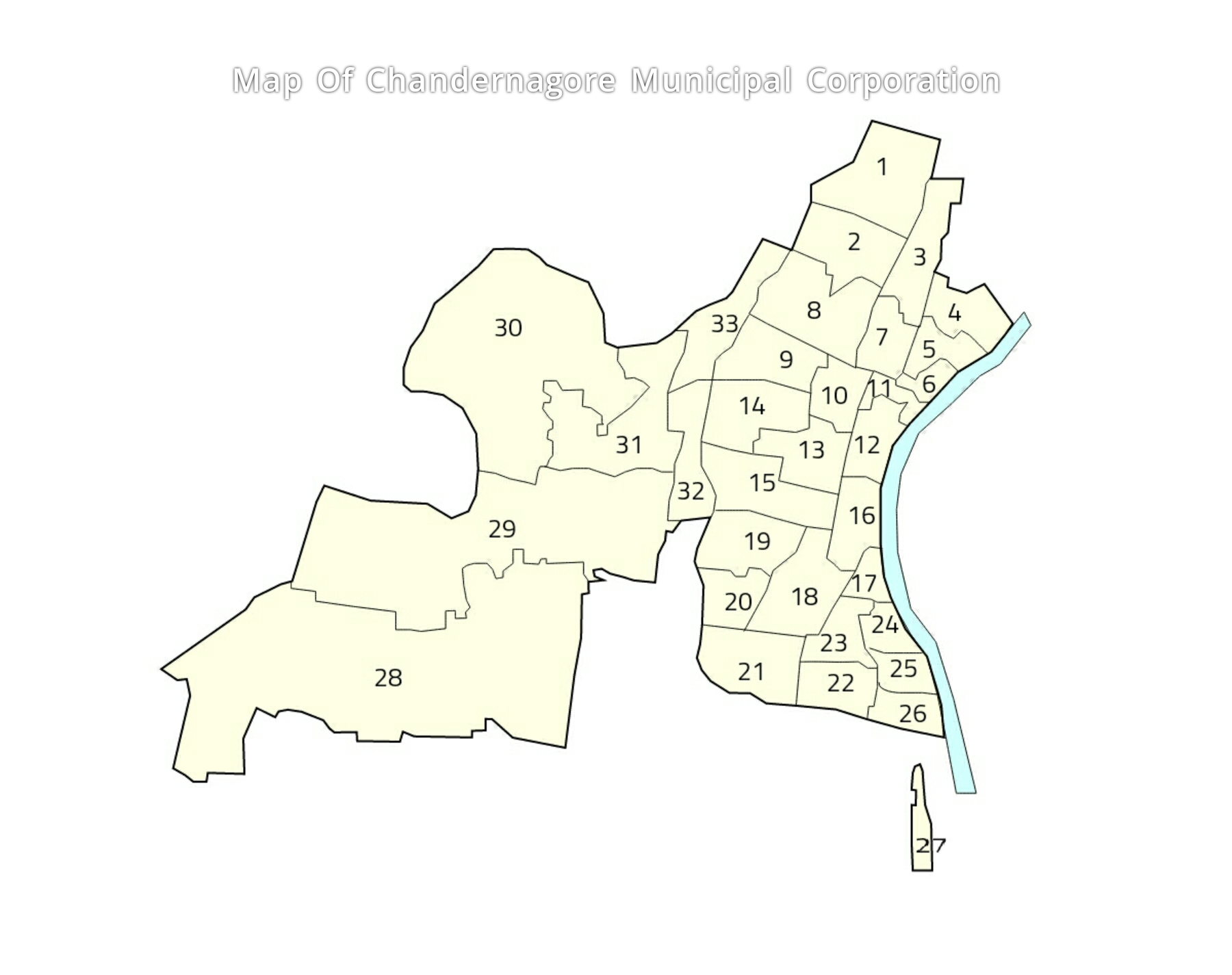
Map of Chandannagore Municipal Corporation

Mayor: Vacant
Deputy Mayor: Vacant
Ward No.	Name of Councillor	Party	Remarks
1			
2			
3			
4			
5			
6			
7			
8			
9			
10			
11			
12			
13			
14			
15			
16			
17			
18			
19			
20			
21			
22			
23			
24			
25			
26			
27			
28			
29			
30			
31			
32			
33			

== Elections ==
=== 2027 ===
S. No.	Party		Councillors	Change
S. No.	Name	Flag	Councillors	Change
1.	AITC		TBA	Steady
2.	INC		TBA	Steady
3.	CPI(M)		TBA	Steady
4.	BJP		TBA	Steady
Wards			33	

=== 2022 ===
S. No.	Party		Councillors	Change
S. No.	Name	Flag	Councillors	Change
1.	AITC		31	▲10
2.	CPI(M)		2	▼5
Wards			33	

=== 2015 ===
S. No.	Party		Councillors	Change
S. No.	Name	Flag	Councillors	Change
1.	AITC		21	▼2
2.	CPI(M)		7	Steady
3.	INC		3	▲3
4.	AIFB		1	Steady
5.	BJP		1	▲1
Wards			33	

=== 2010 ===
S. No.	Party		Councillors	Change
S. No.	Name	Flag	Councillors	Change
1.	AITC		23	▲13
2.	CPI(M)		7	▼13
3.	IND		2	▼1
4.	AIFB		1	▲1
Wards			33	

=== 2005 ===
S. No.	Party		Councillors	Change
S. No.	Name	Flag	Councillors	Change
1.	CPI(M)		20	Steady
2.	AITC		10	Steady
3.	IND		3	Steady
Wards			33	
