= Howrah–Seoraphuli–Bishnupur branch line =

Indian railway line

Sheoraphuli–Bishnupur branch line

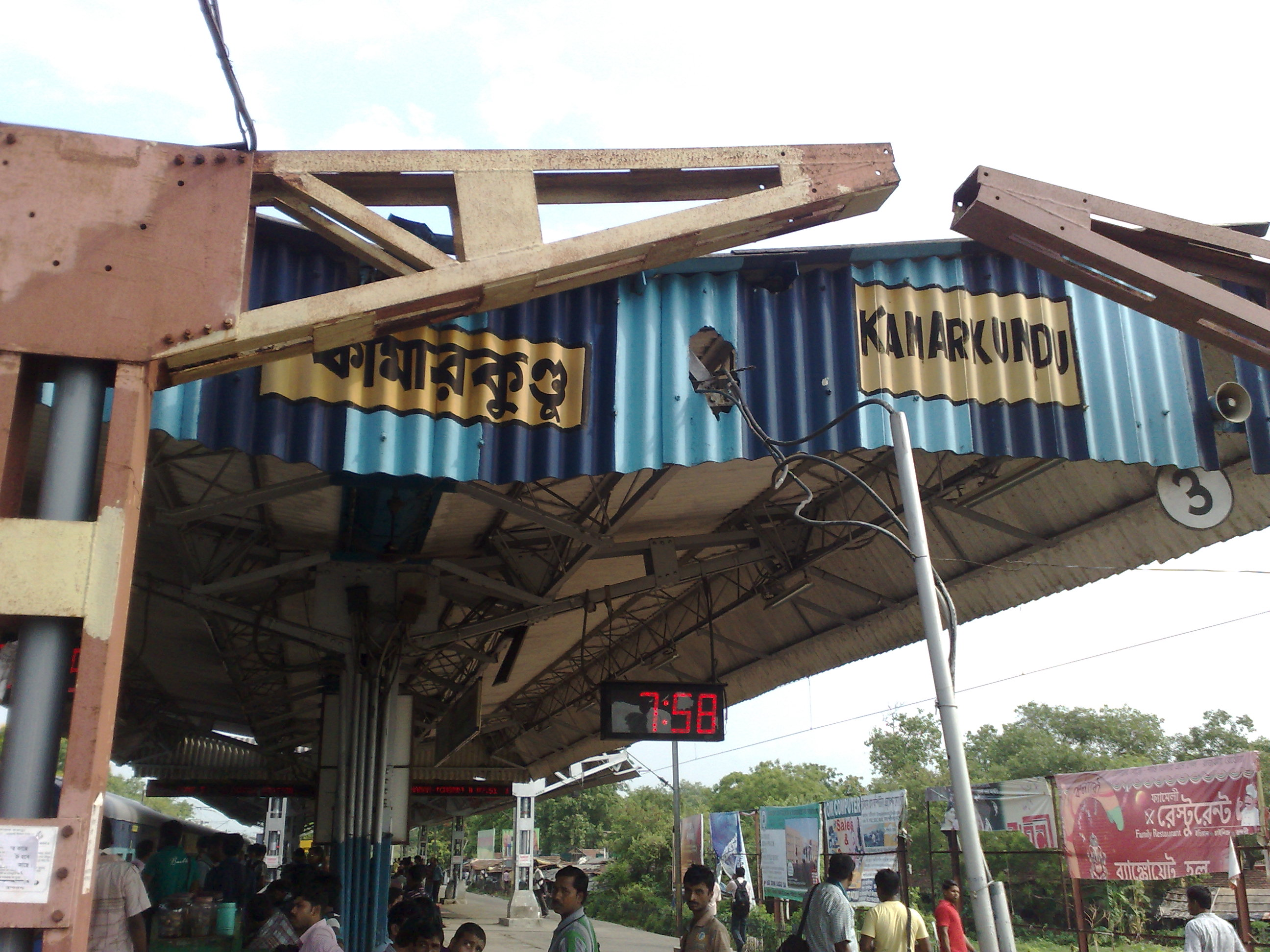
- Kamarkundu railway station lies on Sheoraphuli–Tarakeswar branch line

Overview
- Status: Partially Operational
- Owner: Indian Railways
- Locale: West Bengal
- Termini: Sheoraphuli; Goghat
- Stations: 9

Service
- Type: Heavy rail
- System: Electrified
- Operator(s): Eastern Railway

History
- Opened: 1885; 141 years ago

Technical
- Line length: 39 km (24 mi)
- Track gauge: 5 ft 6 in (1,676 mm) broad gauge
- Operating speed: up to 100 km/h (62 mph)

The Sheoraphuli–Bishnupur branch line also known as Bishnupur—Tarakeshwar Railway line is a railway line connecting Sheoraphuli on the Howrah–Bardhaman main line and Bishnupur. The 39-kilometre-long (24 mi) railway line traverses Hooghly in the Indian state of West Bengal. Sheoraphuli is 23 kilometres (14 mi) from Howrah. It is part of the Kolkata Suburban Railway system.

== History ==
The broad gauge Sheoraphuli–Tarakeswar branch line was opened by the Tarkessur Railway Company on 1 January 1885 and was worked by East Indian Railway Company. The Tarkessur company was taken over by the East Indian Railway in 1915.

The Howrah–Bardhaman chord, which crosses this branch line at Kamarkundu, was opened in 1917. In Railway budget 2010–11, restoration of 51-kilometre-long (32 mi) Tarakeswar-to-Magra section as 5 ft 6 in (1,676 mm) Broad Gauge railway line was proposed. The work is sanctioned in 2010–11. at a cost of 365.17 Cr. Also Tarakeswar–Furfura Sharif 21.8-kilometre-long (13.5 mi) New Line project work was sanctioned in year 2012–13 at a cost of Rs. 162.37 Cr. Final location survey completed. Alignment plan for 20.1 kilometres (12.5 mi) approved. Land plan under finalisation. Formation and bridge work completed in railway land. 219 hectares of land will be required. Formation and bridge work completed in railway land. Work could not be started due to non-availability of land. However, the work has been kept in abeyance by Railway board.

== Electrification ==
The Sheoraphuli–Tarakeswar branch line was first electrified with 3,000 V DC system in 1957. Subsequently, when the Railways decided to adopt the AC system, the branch line was converted to 25 kV AC system in 1967. EMU coaches were introduced on electrification.

== Tarakeswar–Bishnupur extension ==
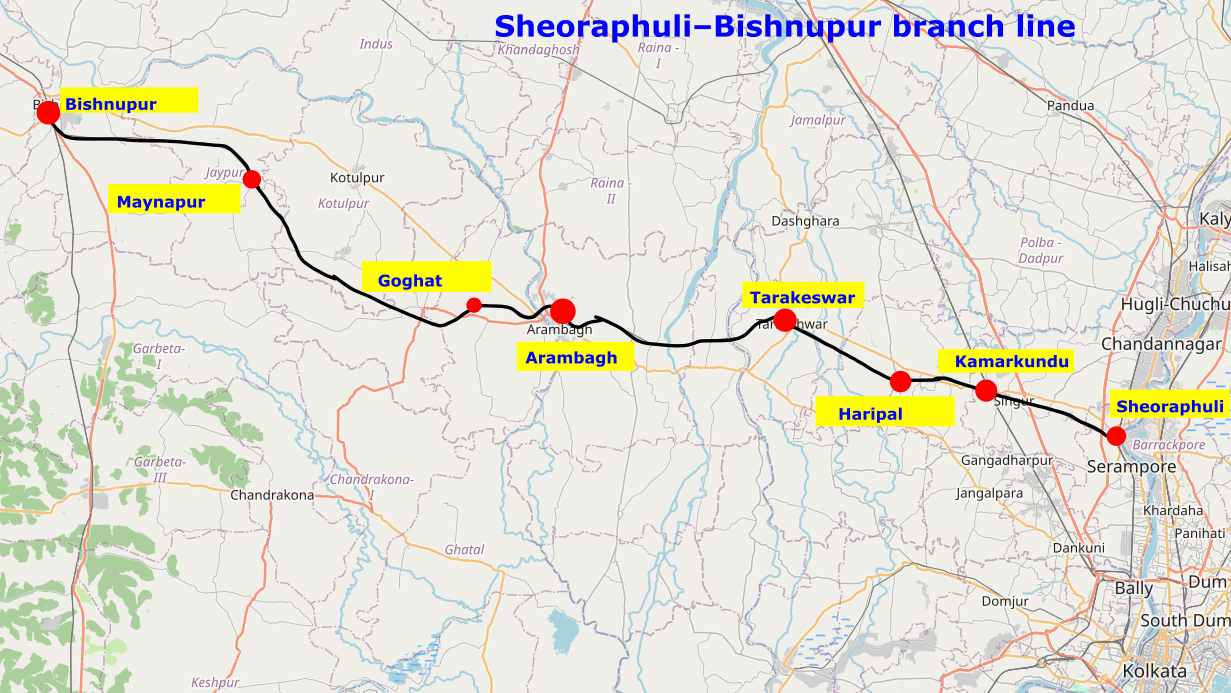
Sheoraphuli–Bishnupur branch line map

The 102-kilometre-long (63 mi) Tarakeswar–Bishnupur project was sanctioned in 1999–2000, but not much work was done for the next decade. After Mamata Banerjee again became railway minister in 2009, work was speeded up. Eastern Railway gave out details of the project in 2003. The proposed fully electrified line was divided into three parts: Tarakeswar–Arambagh 25.6 kilometres (15.9 mi) long, Arambagh–Kodabari 19.6 kilometres (12.2 mi) long, and Kodabari–Bishnupur 56.8 kilometres (35.3 mi) long.

Train services were opened in the Tarakeswar–Talpur section on 25 April 2010. The Talpur–Arambagh sector was opened on 4 June 2012, without electrification and auto signaling.

At the time of inaugurating the line, the Chief Minister had said that the Arambag railway station was to be named after former West Bengal chief minister Prafulla Chandra Sen and the Mayapur railway station was to be named after Raja Rammohan Ray.

Without the overhead electrification the railways had no option but to run diesel-electric multiple unit (DEMU) trains initially. Mukul Roy, railway minister, inaugurated the electrified line to Tarakeswar on 16 September 2012. EMU services have since been introduced.

The completion of the Bishnupur–Gokulnagar sector was announced in the railway budget for 2009–10.

In June 2016, the Tarakeshwar–Goghat section was commissioned for EMU trains with the introduction of three pairs of Howrah–Goghat locals.

In March 2024, construction work between Maynapur & Kamarpukur has started.

=== Status update of the under-construction section of the line ===
Section	Physical Progress	Estimated Commissioning	Total progress
MAYP-BRGNP	100%	commissioned, December 2024	75%
BRGNP-JYRMB	100%	Commissioned, March 2025	75%
JYRMB-KMPKR	44%	Estimated, February 2026	75%
KMPKR-GOGT	65%	Estimated, March 2026	75%

== Stations ==
Sheoraphuli–Bishnupur line
#	Station Name	Station Code	Connections
1	Bishnupur	VSU	Kharagpur–Bankura–Adra line
2	Birsha Munda Halt	BSMH	None
3	Gokulnagar-Joypur	GNJP	None
4	Maynapur	MAYP	None
5	Baragopinathpur	BRGNP	None
6	Jayrambati	JRBI	None
7	Kamarpukur	KMPKR	None
8	Goghat	GOGT	None
9	Arambagh	AMBG	None
10	Tarakeswar	TAK	None
11	Haripal	HPL	None
12	Kamarkundu	KQU	Howrah–Bardhaman chord
13	Sheoraphuli	SHE	Howrah–Bardhaman main line
