= Bhadreswar Municipality =

Municipality in West Bengal, India

Type
- Type: Municipality

History
- Founded: 1869; 157 years ago

Leadership
- Chairman: Proloy Chakroborty, AITC
- Vice Chairman: Firoz Khan, AITC

Structure
- Seats: 22
- Political groups: Government (20): AITC (20); Opposition (1): BJP (1); Other (1): IND (1)

Elections
- Last election: 2022
- Next election: 2027

Website
- bhadreswarmunicipality-gov.in

Bhadreswar Municipality is the civic body that governs Bhadreswar and its surrounding areas in Chandannagore subdivision of Hooghly district, West Bengal, India.

== History ==
Bhadreswar Municipality was established in 1869.

== Geography ==
Bhadreswar Municipality covers an area of 8.28 km^{2} and has a total population of 101,477 (2011).

In 1981, 29.61% of the total population formed main workers and 70.30% were non-workers in Bhadreswar Municipality and 76.75% of the total main workers were industrial workers. This may be interpreted as follows: although industrial activities are prominent in the municipal areas of the region, the major portion of the population is commuters and migrants find employment in the area.

== Education ==
There are around 46 schools (including municipality schools) in Bhadreswar Municipal area. There are a number of schools with facilities for teaching in the Hindi-medium, as for example Telenipara MG Vidyapith, Jawaharlal Nehru Vidyapith, Adarsha Chhatra Sanga Pathsala, Paikpara Sarvoday Vidyamandir, Sree Hanuman Primary School, Victoria Hindi Primary School, etc. Amongst the Urdu-medium schools are: Faiz Ahmed Faiz Urdu High School, Madrasa Mohmmadia Arabia, Jawaharlal Nehru Vidyapith, Madrasah Rizia Habibia, Mohsin Primary School, Muzaffar Ahmed GSFP Primary School, Quasemul Uloom Primary School etc. Andhra Bharatiya Prathamika Vidyalayam is a Telugu-medium school. There also are Bengali and English medium schools.

== Elections ==
In the 2022 Municipal Election for Bhadreswar Municipality Trinamool Congress won 20 out of 22 seats, Independent 1 seat and BJP 1 seat.

In the 2015 municipal elections for Bhadreswar Municipality Trinamool Congress won 11 seats, CPI (M) 5 seats, CPI 1 seat, Congress 1 seat, BJP 2 seats and an independent 1 seat.

In the 2010 municipal elections for Bhadreswar Municipality Trinamool Congress won 13 seats, Congress won 5 seats and CPI (M) 4 seats.

About the 2010 municipal elections, The Guardian wrote, "Today's municipal elections are unlike any for decades: the Communists, who have held West Bengal's main towns almost without a break since the 1970s, are facing disaster… This time defeat is likely to be definitive and could signal the beginning of the end for the Communist Party of India-Marxist (CPIM)."

In the 2005 municipal elections for Bhadreswar Municipality, CPI (M) won 8 seats, CPI 1 seat, Congress 5 seats, Trinamool Congress 5 seats and others 1 seat.
