= Anti-POSCO movement =

Grassroots movement in Odisha against POSCO-India

Anti-POSCO Movement
- Date: c. August 2005 – March 2017
- Location: Jagatsinghpur district, Odisha, India (incl. villages like Dhinkia, Nuagaon, Gobindpur, and Gadakujanga)
- Outcome: POSCO officially announced withdrawal from the project in March 2017.; Acquired land transferred to Odisha government's land bank.
- Deaths: Four individuals killed in a bomb explosion in April 2013. Hundreds were also injured and arrested over the course of the movement.

Anti-POSCO Movement was a prolonged period of grassroots resistance by local communities, primarily farmers and fisherfolk, against the establishment of a massive integrated steel plant by the South Korean company POSCO in the Jagatsinghpur district of Odisha, India. The movement, which began around 2005 following the signing of a Memorandum of Understanding (MoU) between POSCO and the Odisha government, centered on issues of land acquisition, livelihood displacement, environmental protection, and the rights of traditional forest dwellers. After over a decade of sustained protests, legal battles, and state actions resulting in human rights abuse, POSCO officially withdrew from the project in March 2017.

The movement is considered a significant example in India of people's resistance against large-scale industrial projects perceived to be detrimental to local communities and the environment. Indian authorities faced significant backlash over human rights abuse in their attempt to secure land for the deal. It brought to national and international attention the complex issues surrounding development models, land rights, environmental governance, and corporate accountability.

== Background ==
In June 2005, POSCO India, a subsidiary of South Korean steel-making company POSCO, signed a deal with the Government of Odisha to set up a 12 million tons per annum (MTPA) integrated steel plant and a captive port, with a projected investment of $12 billion (around ₹ 65,856 crore). Touted as India's largest foreign direct investment (FDI) at the time, the project required over 4,000 acres of land (overall impact estimated to be over 12,000 acres), largely coastal and fertile, encompassing several villages in the gram panchayats of Dhinkia, Nuagaon, and Gadakujanga near Paradip.

The proposed area was densely populated and supported a local economy based on betel vine cultivation, paddy farming, cashew orchards, and coastal fishing. Estimates suggested that the betel vine economy alone sustained around 20,000 people in the affected villages. The project also involved land classified as forest land, bringing into play the Scheduled Tribes and Other Traditional Forest Dwellers (Recognition of Forest Rights) Act, 2006 of India.

== The Movement ==
Almost immediately after the MoU was signed, local communities began to organize against the project. The 'POSCO Pratirodh Sangram Samiti (PPSS)' was formed in August 2005, becoming the primary organization spearheading the resistance. Other groups like 'Nava Nirmana Samiti' and 'Bhitamati Bachao Andolana' also participated in the protests.

The movement's opposition stemmed from a range of interconnected concerns. Villagers feared the forcible loss of their ancestral lands and homes, with displacement estimates varying widely from POSCO's initial figure of around 450 families to protesters' claims of over 20,000 people facing direct displacement and many more losing their livelihoods. A significant source of anxiety was the potential destruction of the local economy, heavily reliant on the fertile land used for betel vines—a lucrative cash crop—paddy, and other agricultural activities, as well as access to coastal fishing grounds. Furthermore, serious concerns were raised about the project's environmental impact, including potential damage to the coastal ecosystem from the felling of thousands of trees (an estimated 300,000 trees were reportedly felled even in preliminary stages including fruit-bearing trees), effects on local water sources, and the perceived inadequacy of the Environmental Impact Assessment (EIA) reports. Activists and community members also alleged that the government was proceeding with land acquisition without properly recognizing and settling the rights of traditional forest dwellers as mandated by the Forest Rights Act (FRA), 2006, and that Gram Sabha (village council) resolutions rejecting the project were being ignored. The movement also highlighted issues of state repression and human rights violations, reporting heavy police deployment, alleged intimidation, arbitrary arrests, the filing of numerous criminal cases against protesters, and incidents of violence.

To voice their opposition, the Anti-POSCO movement employed various forms of resistance. Villagers, often including women and children, formed human barricades to prevent government officials and POSCO personnel from entering the proposed plant site areas. Peaceful sit-ins, demonstrations, and rallies were regularly organized to draw attention to their plight. Concurrently, the project's environmental clearances faced repeated legal challenges before the National Green Tribunal (NGT) and other courts. A key strategy also involved the assertion of community rights, with Gram Sabhas passing resolutions against the land acquisition, invoking their powers under the FRA.

=== Key phases ===
The resistance unfolded over several years, marked by significant events and escalations. Following the formation of the PPSS in August-September 2005, the movement steadily gained momentum. One notable early incident occurred on November 29, 2007, with allegations of a bombing of peaceful protesters' tents by government forces at Balitutha. This was followed by a major rally on April 1, 2008, at Balitutha, where protesters led by Abhay Sahu defied prohibitory orders.

In 2010, a central government committee, known as the Meena Gupta Committee, reviewed the project and highlighted concerns regarding the implementation of the Forest Rights Act and the project's environmental impact. Despite these concerns, the Ministry of Environment and Forests (MoEF) granted conditional environmental and forest clearances on January 31 and May 2, 2011, respectively. These clearances became subject to legal challenges. A significant turning point came on March 30, 2012, when the National Green Tribunal (NGT) suspended the environmental clearance granted to the project, citing an inadequate assessment of potential environmental impacts.

The situation on the ground remained volatile. In April 2013, violence escalated with reports of a bomb explosion that killed four anti-POSCO protesters during attempts by the administration to acquire land. Subsequently, on May 28, 2013, the NGT again intervened to halt land acquisition activities for POSCO due to the lack of a valid environmental clearance. In an attempt to move forward, POSCO scaled down its planned capacity from 12 MTPA to 8 MTPA in 2013. However, the resistance continued, leading to decision by POSCO to suspend project before scrapping it completely.

=== Key figures ===
Several individuals played prominent roles in leading and supporting the Anti-POSCO movement. Abhay Sahu, as president of the POSCO Pratirodh Sangram Samiti (PPSS), was a central figure in organizing the resistance from its early stages. Prasant Paikray served as a spokesperson for both the Anti-POSCO and later the Anti-Jindal movements, articulating the concerns of the affected communities. Debendra Swain was another key leader of the movement who, along with many others, faced arrest for his activism. Several women activists, including Manorama Khatua, led semi-nude protests against paramilitary action. Shanti Das, a notable woman leader, was actively involved in the protests and also faced arrests, particularly in the later phase of resistance against the JSW project. Other activists such as Nutan Das, Abhaya Mallick, Dillip Kandi, Narayan Muduli, Hrudananda Rout, and Megha Das were also among those who faced arrest during the protracted struggle. The movement also drew support from various national and international human rights organizations and environmental activists who helped to highlight the issues at a broader level.

== Withdrawal of POSCO ==
After years of intense local resistance, persistent legal hurdles, ongoing controversies surrounding environmental clearances and forest rights, significant delays in land acquisition, and changing global market conditions for steel, POSCO officially announced its decision to withdraw from the project. While initial signals of freezing the project came in 2015-2016, the formal exit was communicated to the Odisha government, and by March 2017, the company effectively pulled out. Reasons cited for the withdrawal included the prolonged delay, the failure to acquire the entirety of the required land, and changes in India's Mines and Minerals (Development and Regulation) Act that affected the assurance of captive iron ore mine allocations for the project.

== Aftermath and legacy ==
Following POSCO's withdrawal, the acquired land (approximately 2,700 acres that had been handed over to the company) was returned to the state government's land bank. The failure of deal to materialize had significant impact on environment, loss of livelihoods, and states economy. Subsequently, several projects pulled out of Odisha and foreign-direct investments dropped.

However, the struggle for the local communities did not conclude. In September 2018, the Odisha government allocated a significant portion of this land to JSW Steel for a similar integrated steel plant project. This development led to a resurgence of protests, often referred to as the Anti-Jindal movement, with many of the same leaders and community members at the forefront. They continued to demand the return of their lands and the protection of their livelihoods and environment. The protests against the JSW project also faced state action, with reports of arrests and clashes continuing into the 2020s. Legal battles concerning land rights under the LARR Act, 2013 (Right to Fair Compensation and Transparency in Land Acquisition, Rehabilitation and Resettlement Act) and the FRA also persisted.

== See also ==
- Singur Tata Nano controversy
- Land acquisition in India
