= Land conflict in India =

Land conflict in India is present in 45% of the districts of the country. The conflict is spread over a number of sectors such as infrastructure, power, industry and forestry. 25% of all disputes resolved by the Supreme Court of India are related to land disputes and land acquisition. Inter-state conflict includes those between states in northeast India such as Assam-Mizoram, Assam–Arunachal Pradesh and Assam–Nagaland.

== See also ==
- Northeast India border disputes
- Land reform in India
- Land acquisition in India
- Right to Fair Compensation and Transparency in Land Acquisition, Rehabilitation and Resettlement Act, 2013
- 2011 land acquisition protests in Uttar Pradesh
