= 2011 land acquisition protests in Uttar Pradesh =

In 2011, The Government of Uttar Pradesh in India, faced protests against its proposed forced land acquisition for the building of the Yamuna Expressway. The protests were led by farmers in Gautam Buddha Nagar district including Bhatta and Parsaul villages for low compensation and improper rehabilitation benefits.The protests resulted in sporadic incidents of violence and three deaths.

== Protests ==
In 2009, Yamuna Expressway Industrial Development Authority (YEIDA) attempted to acquire land for 2300 plots. This was opposed by farmers from 14 villages including Bhatta and Parsaul. Farmers filed over 700 writ petitions in Allahabad High Court for low land acquisition rates. The government stated that the 2011 protests were due to "anti-social" elements encouraging the violence.

In 6th May, three officials from the Uttar Pradesh State Road Transport Corporation, a public transport body, were kidnapped by inhabitants of Bhatta village and Parsaul village near Dankaur while in the area to conduct a survey. Violence erupted on 7 May as police moved in to rescue the abducted men, This included a three-hour gun battle between the villagers and police force, which led to the death of two policemen and two civilians, as well as several injured casualties. A number of local farmers were arrested, entry to the village was effectively shut off and Section 144 (a measure to limit unlawful assembly) was imposed in an attempt to quell the troubles. The violence continued on 8 May and the state government deployed 2,000 policemen on 9 May.

In 11th May, Rahul Gandhi, the president of the Indian youth congress reached the village after eluding the police. He conducted a dharna and was subsequently briefly taken into "preventative custody".

Rahul Gandhi claimed that he had seen evidence that many farmers had been murdered and some women raped during the state reaction to the protests. He had seen a heap of ash in the village "with dead bodies inside". There were claims that the situation was now being exploited for political ends by the Congress Party, of which Gandhi and his extended family are prominent members, with elections being due to take place in the state. However, an investigation by the BBC could find nothing to support the allegations, although there was anger regarding the violent beatings and similar actions which had occurred. It was suggested that the numerous farmers who were missing had simply fled the village and not yet returned. Gandhi subsequently attempted to backtrack on his remarks, claiming that he had been misrepresented and then that he had based his comments on conversations with the villagers, but the BBC reporter maintained that he had in fact made the allegations as originally reported. The governing Bahujan Samaj Party subsequently announced that Gandhi's allegations were baseless.

== Aftermath ==
While the bill had been in development for years, the protests highlighted the deficiencies of the colonial Land Acquisition Act of 1894, and underlining the urgency to replace it with the Right to Fair Compensation and Transparency in Land Acquisition, Rehabilitation and Resettlement Act, 2013.

In 2012, Allahabad High Court ordered increasing land compensation by 64%. The court rejected CBI enquiry for alleged rapes and asked state CID for investigation. In 2024, Supreme court upheld the compensation amount. In 2026, the Allahabad High Court dismissed the final set of petitions from farmers, ruling it was already settled in previous court decisions with fair compensation rewarded. The High court allowed the Yamuna Expressway Industrial Development Authority (YEIDA) to proceed with planned residential and industrial development on the disputed land.

== In popular culture ==
This incident was briefly mentioned in the films Matru Ki Bijlee Ka Mandola and Raanjhanaa. The premise of Jolly LLB 3 was inspired by this incident.

In 2013, a documentary named Crushed Dreams containing the interviews of widows of Bhatta, Parsaul and Ghodi Bachheda villages, who were shot dead in police firing during protest against the land acquisition was released.

== See also ==
- Land mafia in India
- Land reform in India
- Land acquisition in India
- Land Acquisition, Rehabilitation and Resettlement Act, 2013
- Tata Nano Singur controversy
