= Northeast India inter-state border disputes =

List of border disputes

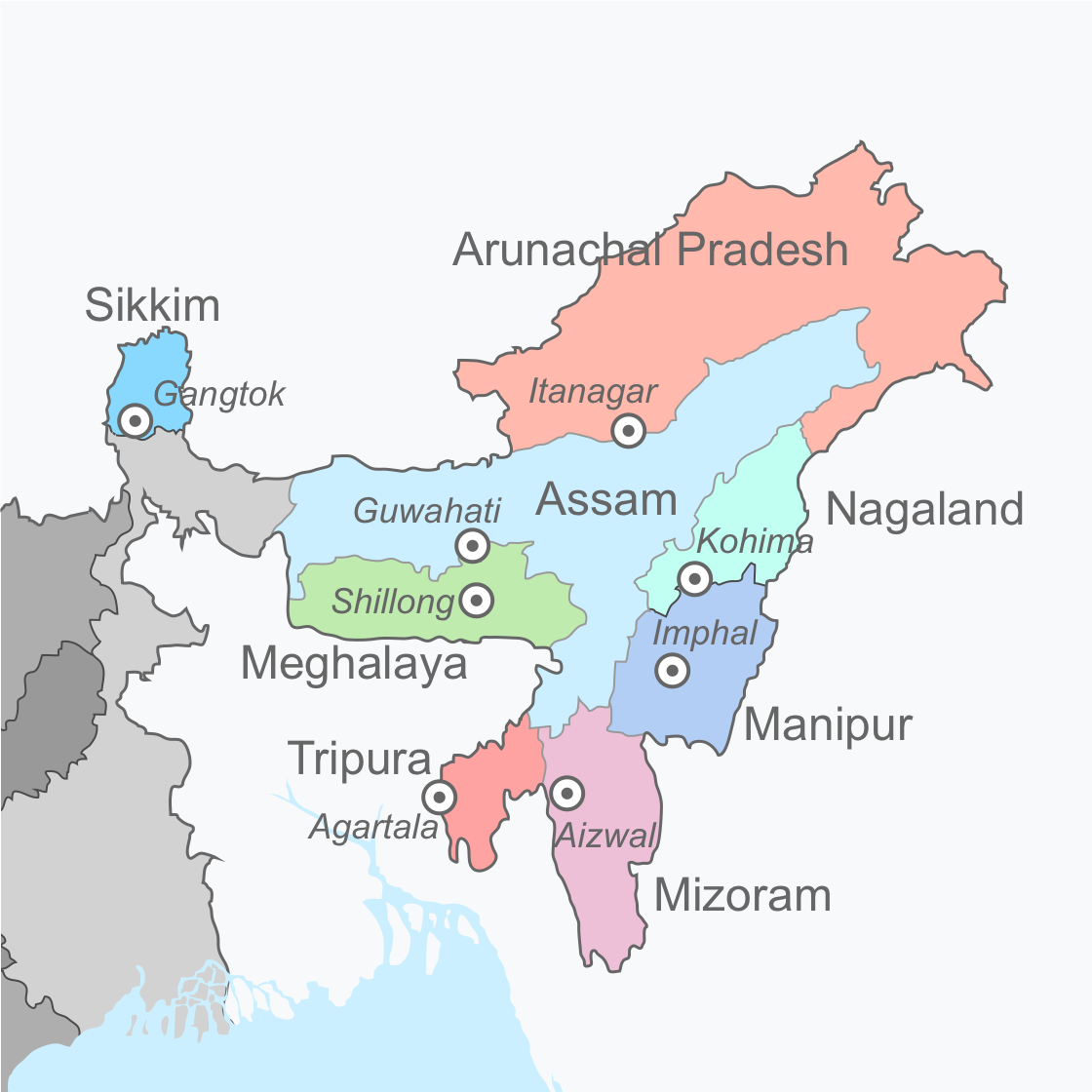
Boundaries are not authoritative

Border disputes of Northeast India mainly include inter-state conflict between Assam–Mizoram, Assam–Arunachal Pradesh, Assam–Nagaland and Assam–Meghalaya. The disputes, including clashes between rival police forces, have resulted in the loss of life, livelihood and property. The border disputes in some cases are part of the larger national (separatist), sub-regional and ethnic conflicts, as well as criminal enterprise fuelled. This internal land conflict in the districts of the northeast are part of the 322 districts affected by ongoing land conflicts out of a total of 703 districts in India.

== Assam–Mizoram ==
Conflict between the British and Lushai Hills (Mizo) tribes caused both sides to feel the need for a boundary. Cachar (Assam) Deputy Commissioner John Ware Edgar signed a treaty/boundary agreement with Lushai (Mizo) Chief Suakpuilala in 1871. Following this the boundary was marked with 46 boundary pillars. One of the first recorded instances of the enforcement of political borders between Assam and Lushai Hills (now Mizoram) was in 1926 when five men, returning from Shillong (then Assam), were arrested by the then Superintendent of Lushai Hills N.E. Parry. In 1933, a notification defined an Inner Line or Boundary Line between then Assam and Lushai Hills district (Mizoram).

Inner Line or Boundary Line of 1933

The 9th March, 1933. No 2106-A.P.

[…] in exercise of the power conferred by section 2 of the Bengal Eastern Frontier Regulation, 1873 (v of 1873), as extended to the Lushai Hills District, the Governor in Council with the previous sanction of the Governor General in Council, is pleased to prescribe the line described below as the 'Inner Line' of the Lushai Hills District.

—

The North-Eastern Areas (Reorganisation) Act, 1971 defines the boundary between Assam and Mizoram in independent India; this is based on the 1933 notification. However, the usage of the 1933 notification in the modern context is disputed. In 1972 Mizoram was carved out of Assam as a union territory, and following the Mizoram Peace Accord, in 1987 it became a state. Initially Mizoram accepted the border with Assam but following encroachment, Mizoram started disputing the border.

1980s onwards, there have been skirmishes, small buildings have been set on fire, economic blockades have been attempted, and in 2021, 6 Assam Police personnel died in a firing incident by Mizoram Police. Both sides blame each for this serious escalation of the conflict which resulted in 80 persons also getting injured. The central government stepped in to assist in de-escalating the immediate situation between the rival state police forces and attempt a future solution.

== Assam–Nagaland ==
Assam-Nagaland borders timeline
1826	Treaty of Yandabo (Naga territory divided between Burma and India without Nagas knowing)
1866	Naga Hills District, British India established
1880	Nagas resist British forces until fall of Khonoma Village
1925	Notification 3102R (25 November), suppresses all previous definitions of Naga Hills District, provides amended definition for the whole boundary
1947	14 August, Nagas declare Independence
1957	Naga Hills-Tuensang Area Act, 1957
1962	State of Nagaland Act, 1962
1972	Sundaram Commission with boundary mandate, initiated 4 interim agreements to maintain status quo
1985	Shastri Commission constituted with boundary mandate
1997	J.K. Pillai Commission with boundary mandate
1998	Assam government goes to Supreme Court with regard to the boundary with Nagaland
2006	Justice Variava Commission, later Justice Tarun Chatterjee, with boundary mandate

As with the case of the Assam–Mizoram, the Assam–Nagaland dispute, has its roots in colonial history which was worsened by the creation of Nagaland as a separate state in 1963. In June 1968, a clash between government forces and militants resulted in the deaths of at least 150. Kalyan Sundaram was appointed on 7 August 1971 to analyse the problem with the specific mandate of looking into the border. This resulted in four interim agreements, however in the long run this did not have much of an effect on the dispute. Following this some major events in the conflict include: 54 killed and 23,500 forced into relief camps in 1979 (between Rengma and Karbi tribes); 41 killed including 28 police personnel in 1985 (Merapani incident) and 17 killed and 10,000 forced into relief camps in 2014.

Territorial claims of Nagaland in Assam include parts of Golaghat district, Jorhat district, and Sibsagar district in the Disputed Area Belt (DAB). Four interim-agreements signed in 1972 put the reserve forests of "Geleki, Abhoypur, Tiru Hills, Dessoi Valley and Doyang" off limits for activity like construction of roads. The interim-agreements remained in place for longer than intended.

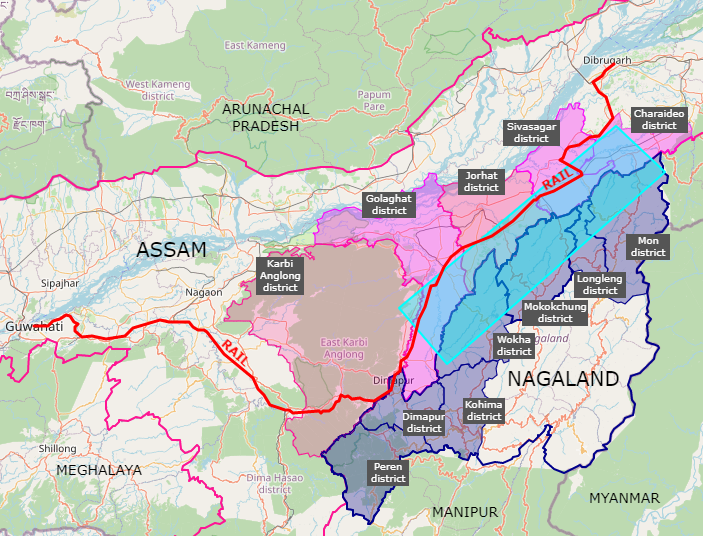
"This deplorable situation was brought to an end by four Interim Agreements. Two of them were signed by the Chief Secretaries on 31-3-1972 (at) Shillong […] These four agreements between them covered the boundary between Assam and Nagaland from the Taukok river to the Doyang river." — Shastri report, 1985. (Represented by the light blue/cyan area). The red line denotes Guwahati-Dibrugarh rail route, the NSCN(IM) claim in the four districts.

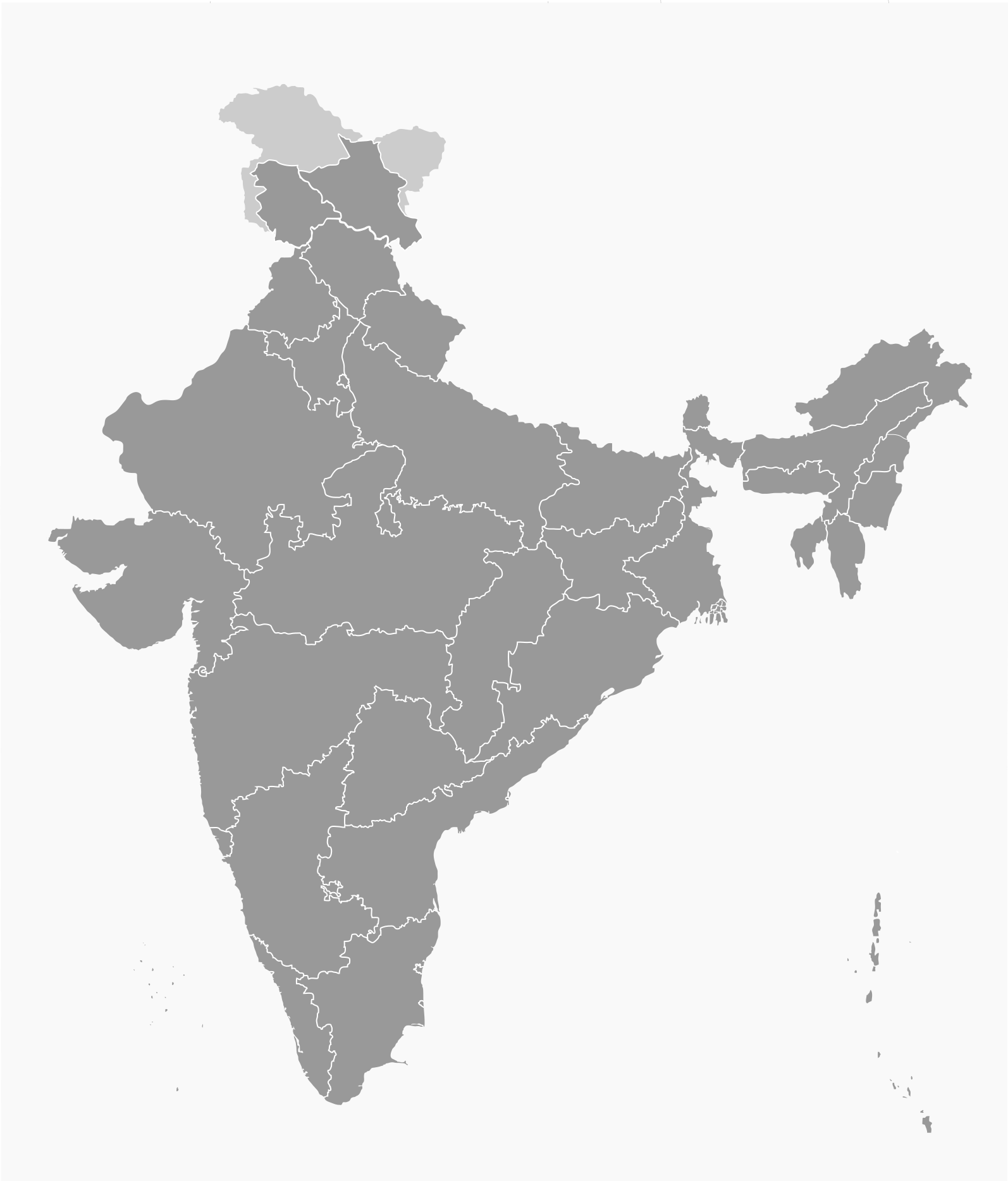
Assam-Nagaland sensitive areas. Major conflict events.

=== Disputed Area Belt ===
The DAB, officially, is forest land (Forest Reserves or reserved forests) and linked with the British Inner Line, "put up to protect the civilized state in the plains from raids and encroachment from the ungoverned Naga areas". Doyang RF designated in 1911 is now no longer a forest, though its official designation remains. DAB has been converted to an agricultural zone from the official protected forest it once was and on paper remains. These encroachments have helped the governments in both Assam and Nagaland, as well as the various factions of separatist NSCN, lay claim to the territory, despite an official status quo is supposed to be in place. And while the status quo is in place, no "regularisation" has taken place. No patta rights or land rights exist, but encroachments are supported. Once these encroached lands were on the edges, but now are at the center of the border dispute.

To further cement their claims both Assam and Nagaland abide by informal practices in the DAB. Supporting encroachment in the 1960s led to population growth in DAB areas, resulting in the need to build schools. Both government and private school have been set up since 1971. Overlapping administrative have been created such as Niuland and Kohobotu. In 1979 the CRPF was called into the DAB as a "neutral" force, following the 1985 Merapani incident DAB was put under the CRPF. State transport bus services are present in DAB. "Insurgent taxation" was a reality in the DAB.

Divisions of the Disputed Area Belt (DAB)
Sector	Size	Location
A	131.12 mi^{2} (339.6 km^{2})	Diphu RF
B	586 mi^{2} (1,520 km^{2})	South Nambor RF
C	2,825.76 mi^{2} (7,318.7 km^{2})	Rengma RF
D	285.76 mi^{2} (740.1 km^{2})	Doyang RF
E		Jorhat
F		Sivasagar
Total	12,882 km^{2} (4,974 mi^{2})	

== Assam–Meghalaya ==
The Assam Meghalaya dispute was further exacerbated by disagreements related to the Assam Reorganisation (Meghalaya) Act of 1969.

== Dispute management and resolution ==
=== Peace accords, autonomous councils and states ===
Autonomous councils in North East India

To address the larger conflict in the northeast which directly affects the situation of the internal borders, the Indian government has signed more than 13 peace accords between 1949 and 2005. Creation of autonomous council, and its upgradation to states, is part of this process. However, after the creation of Arunachal Pradesh and Mizoram in 1986, no new states have been created, only autonomous administrative divisions.

=== Demarcation ===
The task of demarcating the boundaries would be assisted by the North-Eastern Space Applications Centre (set up by the North Eastern Council and Department of Space), thus integrating space technology and satellite imagery into the mapping process.

=== Supreme Court ===
In 1989, Assam filed a case before the Supreme Court of India in relation to the border dispute with Arunachal Pradesh and Nagaland.

=== Commissions and mediators ===
Assam-Nagaland

- Sundaram Commission (1971)
- Shastri Commission (1985)
- Variava/Tarun Chatterjee Commission (2006)
- Mediators Sriram Panchu and Niranjan Bhatt (2010)

=== Border Peace Coordination Committee ===
Border Peace Coordination Committee provides for localised negotiation on the borderlands between Assam and Nagaland, such as when a localised land disputes arise. As ownership is not attached to the state, informal direct negotiations take place, usually in CRPF camp.

== Background ==
Evolution of states and borders

1826

1951

1970

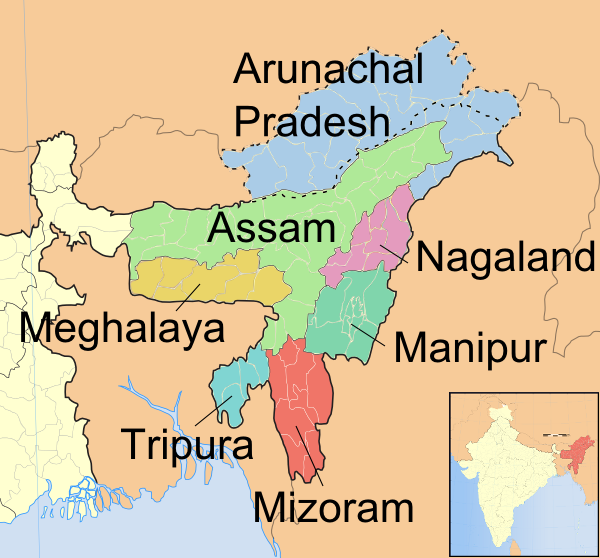
Today
