= Land acquisition in India =

Acquisition of land by the Indian Government

Official gazette of Land and Acquisition Act, 1894

Land acquisition is the power of the union or a state government in India to take private land for public, and to compensate the original owners and other persons affected due to such acquisition.

== Significance ==
The degree of land acquisition by the government in India has manifested itself on a large national scale over time, affecting great proportions of the country. In 2011, the amount of land used for agriculture decreased in greater degrees than in previous years like 1991 and 2000, owing this to government land acquisition. 2011 is the year when land rehabilitation bills combating land acquisition were starting to be proposed, but it is evident that the government has been progressively reducing the resources allocated to agriculture in India. Additionally, there was an almost 2 percent increase in the use of non agricultural land in the decade following 2001. Overall, these land acquisition schemes and urbanizing agendas of the government have resulted in more than 20 million people being forced from their lands in the last 40 years, with 70% not receiving proper compensation and relocation. When considering the amount of displacement since the start of independence in India, this number grows to as high as 50 million afflicted by land acquisition, with 10% of the nation's productive land taken for purposes differing from the original intended use of the land.

== Legislative powers and limits ==
Until 2013, the Land Acquisition Act of 1894 governed land acquisition in India. The 1894 Act provided compensation to landowners but did not provide any form of compensation to other persons affected by the acquisition. The older law did not clearly define public purpose or fair compensation. After a number of attempts, the UPA government was able to replace the 1894 Act with Right to Fair Compensation and Transparency in Land Acquisition, Rehabilitation and Resettlement Act, 2013 (2013 LARR Act).

The 2013 LARR Act focuses on providing not only compensation to the land owners, but also extend rehabilitation and resettlement benefits to livelihood looser from the land, which shall be in addition to the minimum compensation. The minimum compensation to be paid to the land owners is based on a multiple of market value and other factors laid down in the Act. The Act forbids or regulates land acquisition when such acquisition would include multi-crop irrigated area. The Act changed the norms for acquisition of land for use by private companies or in case of public-private partnerships, including compulsory approval of 80% of the landowners. The Act also introduced changes in the land acquisition process, including a compulsory social-impact study, which need to be conducted before an acquisition is made.

The new law, also has some serious shortcomings as regards its provisions for socioeconomic impact assessment and it has also bypassed the constitutional local self governments by not recognizing them as "appropriate governments" in matters of land acquisition.

The 2013 LARR Act becoming applicable across India, from 1 January 2014.

In addition to the 2013 LARR Act, other laws govern the land acquisition process

- the Ancient Monuments and Archaeological Sites and Remains Act, 1958
- the Atomic Energy Act, 1962
- the Damodar Valley Corporation Act, 1948
- the Indian Tramways Act, 1886
- the Land Acquisition (Mines) Act, 1885
- the Metro Railways (Construction of Works) Act, 1978
- the National Highways Act, 1956
- the Petroleum and Minerals Pipelines (Acquisition of Right of User of Land) Act, 1962
- the Requisitioning and Acquisition of Immovable Property Act, 1952
- the Resettlement of Displaced Persons (Land Acquisition) Act, 1948
- the Coal Bearing Areas Acquisition and Development Act, 1957
- the Electricity Act, 2003
- the Railways Act, 1989

On 31 December 2013, the President of India promulgated an ordinance with an official mandate to "meet the twin objectives of farmer welfare; along with expeditiously meeting the strategic and developmental needs of the country". An amendment bill was then introduced in Parliament to endorse the Ordinance. Lok Sabha passed the bill, which awaits passage by the Rajya Sabha. On 30 May 2015, President of India promulgated the amendment ordinance for third time.

The land acquisition in Jammu and Kashmir was governed by the Jammu and Kashmir Land Acquisition Act, 1934 until 31 October 2019, when The Jammu and Kashmir Reorganisation Act, 2019 extended 2013 LARR Act and repealed the state law.

=== Proposed Amendments ===
The current Narendra Modi led National Democratic Alliance government driven Land Acquisition Amendment Bill in the Lok Sabha on 10 March 2015 has seen a tough resistance from key position parties in India who have called the proposed amendments "anti farmer" and "anti poor". The proposed amendments remove requirements for approval from farmers to proceed with land acquisition under five broad categories of projects. While the bill was passed in Lok Sabha, it still needs approval from the Rajya Sabha, where the current government does not have a majority, for the proposed amendments to become effective.

The following were the main disputation points:

- the removal of the consent clause, which requires "approval of the 70% of the land owners for PPP projects and 80% for the private entities", for certain purposes such as industrial corridors, public-private-partnership (PPP) projects, rural infrastructure, affordable housing and defense projects
- the removal of social assessment before land acquisition for the purposes listed above
- the removing the limit of 5 years for return of un-utilised land
- the expansion of land acquisition to other private entities
- the requirement of prior sanction from the government to prosecute wrongdoing by any government official conducts any wrongdoing

The amendment bill was strong opposed by opposition parties, farmers, labour unions and other stakeholders.

== Issues ==
Some of the important issues surrounding the Land Acquisition are discussed below.

=== Eminent Domain ===
The power to take property from the individual is rooted in the idea of eminent domain. The doctrine of eminent domain states, the sovereign can do anything, if the act of sovereign involves public interest. The doctrine empowers the sovereign to acquire private land for a public use, provided the public nature of the usage can be demonstrated beyond doubt. The doctrine is based on the following two Latin maxims, (1) Salus populi suprema lex (Welfare of the People Is the Paramount Law) and (2) Necessitas publica major est quam (Public Necessity Is Greater Than Private Necessity). In the history of modern India, this doctrine was challenged twice (broadly speaking) once when land reform was initiated and another time when Banks were nationalized.

The Constitution of India originally provided the right to property is a legal right under government only (which includes land) under Articles 19 and 31. Article 19 guaranteed that all citizens have the right to acquire, hold and dispose of property. Article 31 stated that "no person shall be deprived of his property save by authority of law." It also indicated that compensation would be paid to a person whose property has been taken for public purposes (often subject to wide range of meaning). The Forty-Fourth Amendment of 1978 deleted the right to property from the list of fundamental rights with an introduction of a new provision, Article 300-A, which provided that "no person shall be deprived of his property save by authority of law" (Constitution 44th Amendment, w.e.f. 10.6.1979). The amendment ensured that the right to property‟ is no longer a fundamental right but rather a constitutional/legal right/as a statutory right and in the event of breach, the remedy available to an aggrieved person is through the High Court under Article 226 of the Indian Constitution and not the Supreme Court under Article 32 of the Constitution. State must pay compensation at the market value for such land, building or structure acquired (Inserted by Constitution, Seventeenth Amendment) Act, 1964, the same can be found in the earlier rulings when property right was a fundamental right (such as 1954 AIR 170, 1954 SCR 558, which propounded that the word "Compensation" deployed in Article 31(2) implied full compensation, that is the market value of the property at the time of the acquisition. The Legislature must "ensure that what is determined as payable must be compensation, that is, a just equivalent of what the owner has been deprived of"). Elsewhere, Justice O Chinnappa Reddy ruled (State Of Maharashtra v. Chandrabhan Tale on 7 July 1983) that the fundamental right to property has been abolished because of its incompatibility with the goals of "justice" social, economic and political and "equality of status and of opportunity" and with the establishment of "a socialist democratic republic, as contemplated by the Constitution. There is no reason why a new concept of property should be introduced in the place of the old so as to bring in its wake the vestiges of the doctrine of Laissez Faire and create, in the name of efficiency, a new oligarchy. Efficiency has many facets and one is yet to discover an infallible test of efficiency to suit the widely differing needs of a developing society such as ours" (1983 AIR 803, 1983 SCR (3) 327). The concept of efficiency has been introduced by Justice O Chinnappa Reddy, coupled with the condition of infallibility.

In India, with this introduction of ‘social’ elements to the property rights, a new phase had begun. K. K. Mathew, justice of Kesavananda Bharati vs State of Kerala (cited in) stated this precisely: "Property in consumable goods or means of production worked by their owners (use aspects of property) were justified as necessary condition of a free and purposeful life; but when property gave power not only over things but through things over persons (power aspect of property) also, it was not justified as it was an instrument of servitude rather than freedom" (See for more on ‘Social’ Element of Property Rights as a Guiding Problem).

=== Monetary compensation ===
Major Indian infrastructure projects such as the Yamuna Expressway have paid about ₹2800 crore (US$500 million) for land, or over US$25,000 per acre between 2007 and 2009. For context purposes, this may be compared with land prices elsewhere in the world:

- According to the Financial Times, in 2008, the farmland prices in France were Euro 6,000 per hectare ($2,430 per acre; ₹1,09,350 per acre).
- According to the United States Department of Agriculture, as of January 2010, the average farmland value in the United States was $2,140 per acre (₹96,300 per acre). The farmland prices in the United States varied between different parts of the country, ranging from $480 per acre to $4,690 per acre. However the earning per acre at other countries and current general peasant life status are to be accounted for in drawing conclusions. Due to unfavourable agricultural conditions in many states of India, peasants are looking for monetisation of their only property, the land to protect their future generations.

A 2010 report by the Government of India, on labor whose livelihood depends on agricultural land, claims that, per 2009 data collected across all states in India, the all-India annual average daily wage rates in agricultural occupations ranged between ₹ 53 and 117 per day for men working in farms (US$354 to 780 per year), and between ₹41 and 72 per day for women working in farms (US$274 to 480 per year). This wage rate in rural India study included the following agricultural operations common in India: ploughing, sowing, weeding, transplanting, harvesting, winnowing, threshing, picking, herdsmen, tractor driver, unskilled help, masonry, etc.

The compensation for the acquired land is based on the value of the agricultural land, however price increases have been ignored. The land value would increase many times, which the current buyer would not benefit from. Secondly, if the prices are left for the market to determine, the small peasants could never influence the big corporate tycoons. Also it is mostly judiciary who has awarded higher compensation then bureaucracy (Singh 2007).

=== Consequences ===
The consequences of land acquisition in India are manifold. The empirical and theoretical studies on displacement through the acquisition of land by the government for development projects have so far focused on the direct and immediate adverse consequences of land acquisition. Most of the analytical as well as the descriptive accounts of the immediate consequences of land acquisition for development projects draws heavily from Michael Cernea's ‘impoverishment risk model’, which broadly enumerated eight ‘risks’ or ‘dimensions’ of development-induced displacement. These eight risks are very much direct and basic in nature which are (i) landlessness, (ii) joblessness, (iii) marginalization, (iv) loss of access to common property resources, (v) increased morbidity and mortality, (vi) food insecurity, (vii) homelessness and (viii) social disarticulation. Recently L.K. Mahapatra has added ‘loss of education’ as another impoverishment risk in situations of displacement (Mahapatra 1999).

But apart from these direct and immediate effects of land acquisition there are more subtle and indirect effects of this coercive and centralized legal procedure, which have a bearing on various decentralised and participatory democratic processes, and institutions of the state power. Land reforms and the Panchayati raj institutions are the two most important areas, which are being vitiated by land acquisition. Of all the states of India, the consequences and controversies around land acquisition in West Bengal has recently gained a lot of national and international attention. The peasant resistances against governmental land expropriation in Singur (a place in the Hoogly district) and Nandigram (a place in the East Medinipur district) has finally led to the fall of the communist party (Marxist) led government in West Bengal, which ruled the state through democratic election for 34 years. The communist led left front government of West Bengal under the economic liberalisation policy adopted by the Central/Union government of the country shifted from its pro-farmer policy and took to the capitalist path of industrial development, which at the micro-levels endangered the food security of the small and marginal farmers as well as sharecroppers who formed the vote bank of the left front government of West Bengal The new anti-communist Trinamul Congress led government of West Bengal which came to power in the state in 2011 through a massive electoral victory is yet to develop any comprehensive resettlement and rehabilitation policy for the thousands of families affected by various development projects. The new government has enacted a law on 14 June 2011, in the West Bengal Assembly named ‘Singur Land Rehabilitation and Development Act, 2011’. With this law, the West Bengal government has reacquired about 1000 acres of farmland from the Tatas which was given to the company for building a small-car manufacturing factory in 2006 by the then Left Front government. The Trinamul government's intention was to return 400 acres of farmland to the ‘unwilling’ farmers around whom the agitation against the Left Front government was organised by the Trinamul Congress party. However, now the whole issue seems to have fallen into a long legal battle between the present state government and the Tatas, as the latter has challenged the ‘Singur Land Rehabilitation and Development Act’ in the court. As a result, the Trinamul government has not yet been able to return the land to those ‘unwilling farmers’ nor have they received any compensation (The Statesman, 12 January 2012).In another case of governmental land acquisition for housing at North 24 Parganas district of West Bengal, the farmers began to cultivate their farmland which were acquired but remained unutilised. According to media report these farmers were assured by the Trinamul Congress party leaders before the election that their land, which is about 1687 acres would be returned to them if the party could come to power. However, now these farmers are turning their backs to the Trinamul Congress, since the party has not kept its pre-election promise (The Statesman, 11 February 2012). Under the above disturbing episodes, it may be worthwhile to narrate the glaring incident of the opposition levelled by Mamata Banerjee, the present chief minister of West Bengal to the draft Land Acquisition (Amendment) Bill 2007 in the Lok Sabha. At that time Miss Mamata Banerjee was the Railway Minister of the Central Government. She opposed to a clause of the bill which empowered private companies to acquire up to 70 per cent land directly from farmers and landowners. The remaining 30 per cent could be acquired by the state government. Miss Banerjee wanted private companies to buy 100 per cent of the land, according to a report (The Statesman, 26 July 2009). It seemed that Miss Banerjee would have allowed the amended Bill to be passed if the Lok Sabha agreed to modify the 70/30 proportion to 100 per cent purchase by the companies under the principleof willing-buyer-willing-seller.

The example of Miss Mamata Banerjee highlights an important aspect of land acquisition that occurs primarily with farmers, called recombinant urbanization. With the Green Revolution, more efficient farming methods, better fertilizers and better equipment were important developments for those in the agrarian industry. However, private Indian sugar corporations would disproportionately distribute these better fertilizers and resources to certain regions of India, leaving other poorer regions grasping for more funds and prosperity. Consequently, these same sugar cooperatives among other companies would target these poorer-funded regions with small-time farmers, and coerce them into pooling their land and meager resources together into real estate companies, becoming shareholders in the new companies on the condition that they conceded land, and attempting to justify such coercion by the concept of eminent domain and greater social benefit.

Eminent domain doctrine has been widely used in India since the era of Independence, with over 21.6 million people in the period of 1951–90. They have been displaced with large-scale projects like dams, canals, thermal plants, sanctuaries, industrial facilities, and mining (Pellissery and Dey Biswas 2012, pp 32–54). These occurrences are generally categorized as "development-induced displacement".

The process of land acquisition in India has proven unpopular with the citizenry. The amount reimbursed is fairly low with regard to the current index of prices prevailing in the economy. Furthermore, due to the low level of human capital of the displaced people, they often fail to find adequate employment.

The draft of the government's National Policy for Rehabilitation states that a figure around 75% of the displaced people since 1951 are still awaiting rehabilitation. However, displacement is only being considered with regard to "Direct Displacement". These rehabilitation policies do not cover fishermen, landless laborers, and artisans. Roughly one in ten Indian tribals is a displaced person. Dam projects have displaced close to a million Adivasis, with similar woe for displaced Dalits. Some estimate suggests 40 percent of displaced people are of tribal origins (Fernandes, 2008).

Political and social protests against land acquisition by various industrialists has risen. They have ranged from Bengal, Karnataka, and Uttar Pradesh. Tata Monors' acquisition of 997 acres in Bengal to set up a factory for the cheapest car in India sparked protests. At least a decade before the Singur episode similar events occurred in West Bengal, although the opposition parties and other civil society organisations remained silent at that time. Similarly, the Sardar Sarovar Dam project on the river Narmada was planned on acquired land, though the World Bank later canceled the project (Bøås and McNeill 2003, pp 121-122, 125, 142-43 and more).

The Land Acquisition Act of 1894 allowed the government to acquire private lands. It is the only legislation pertaining to land acquisition which, though amended several times, has failed to serve its purpose. Under the 1894 Act, displaced people were only liable for monetary compensation linked with market value of the land in question, which was still quite minimal considering circle rates are often misleading (Singh 2007). Land acquisition related conflicts during the post-reform period in India has shown three distinctive tendencies; (1) Technocracy and Bundle of Rights, (2) Power-land Regulation Nexus, and (3) Disappearing Commons.

Displaced Tribals
Project	State	Displaced Population	Tribal Percentage
Karjan	Gujarat	11,600	100
Sardar Sarovar	Gujarat	2,00,000	57.6
Maheshwar	Madhya Pradesh	20,000	60
Bodhghat	Madhya Pradesh	12,700	73.91
Icha	Bihar	30,800	80
Chandil	Jharkhand	37,600	87.92
Koel Karo	Bihar	66,000	88
Mahi Bajaj Sajar	Rajasthan	38,400	76.28
Polavaram	Andhra Pradesh	1,50,000	52.90
Maithon & Panchet	Jharkhand	93,874	56.46
Upper Indravati	Odisha	18,500	89.20
Pong	Himachal Pradesh	80,000	56.25
Ichampalli	Andhra Pradesh	38,100	76.28
Tultuti	Maharashtra	13,600	51.61
Daman Ganga	Gujarat	8,700	48.70
Bhakra	Himachal Pradesh	36,000	34.76
Masan Reservoir	Bihar	3,700	31
Ukai Reservoir	Gujarat	52,000	18.92
Tamnar	Chhattisgarh	59999	

As outlined in the table, numerous indigenous tribes of India have been displaced by method of land acquisition. Among these displaced tribes is a tribe of people not outlined in the table, from the region of Koraput. This land contains which rich deposits of bauxite rock, which are desirable for a variety of reasons. The millions of tons of this material located in such regions is then smelted into alumina ore. The Baphlimali 173 documentary, created in 2001, delves extensively into this bauxite mining crisis and its effects. It talks about the method of processing alumina into aluminum, which is commonly used in popular beverages like soda cans. It outlines the U.S. as the leading consumer of the aluminum produced from the mining occurring in the Koraput region, fueled by a large demand for soda can beverages. One of the largest hills with the most bauxite ore in the Koraput region contains over 173 million tons of bauxite ore, which the government and various private corporations have been party to seizing as part of the land in years past.

== Alternatives ==
One of the alternative proposals to land acquisition is leasing the land from landowners for a certain lease period. Proponents cite how land acquisition policies by Governments unwittingly encourage rampant land speculation making the projects expensive since huge portion of investment would be need to be allocated for land acquisition costs. According to them, policies of land acquisition gave way to political cronyism where land is acquired cheaply by securing favors from local governments and sold to industries at steep markup prices. Leasing land, may also support sustainable project development since the lands need to be returned to the landowners at the end of the lease period in a condition similar to its original form without considerable environmental degradation. When the land is leased then anybody who has to otherwise give up land or livelihood will be compensated for its growing valuation over time. In this model, the landowner lends her land to the government for a steadily-increasing rent, or through an annuity-based system as currently practiced in Haryana and Uttar Pradesh.

Some industries already follow the model of leasing lands instead of acquiring it. Energy development projects such as oil & gas extraction usually lease lands. Renewable energy projects such as Wind Power farms projects often lease the land from land owners instead of trying to acquire the land which could make the projects prohibitively expensive.

Another already established package for any development project is called benefit-sharing, and it is based on Nagoya Protocol on Access to Genetic Resources and the Fair and Equitable Sharing of Benefits Arising from their Utilization to the Convention on Biological Diversity, also known as the Nagoya Protocol on Access and Benefit Sharing (ABS).

== Denotification of land ==
Denotification of land is the cancellation of a notification of intent to acquire land. It is issued by government due to change in plans or following a court order.

An example of denotification of land is, the land notified for Chennai Airport expansion in Tamil Nadu. In May 2007, 1066.99 acres of land was notified from five villages namely Manapakkam, Kolapakkam, Gerugambakkam, Tharapakkam and Kovur (land identified for displacement) for construction of a parallel runway. Due to protests by owners, local residents and other affected persons, Ministry of Environment and Forest cleared acquisition of only 130 acres. Subsequently, the International Civil Aviation Organization stated in their report that there is no further scope for expansion in the present Chennai Airport. Accordingly, the Airports Authority of India informed the Government of Tamil Nadu in November 2011 that they do not require the land and that it can be released. Subsequently, Tamil Nadu Government issued a government order denotifying 852.88 acres of land in the villages mentioned above in January 2014.

== See also ==
- Land reform in India
- Land conflict in India
