= Tata Nano Singur controversy =

Controversy over a proposed Tata Motors auto factory in West Bengal, India

The Tata Nano Singur controversy was a controversy generated by land acquisition for a proposed Tata Motors automobile factory at Singur in Hooghly district, West Bengal, India. The factory would have been used to build the compact car Tata Nano.

The erstwhile state government of West Bengal created the controversy by citing the Land Acquisition Act, 1894 rule to conduct an eminent domain takeover of 997 acres (4.03 km^{2}) of farmland on which Tata Motors was supposed to build its factory. The rule is meant for public improvement projects, and the state government wanted Tata to build in its state. The project was opposed by activists and opposition parties in West Bengal.

Leadership positions within the Singur Krishi Jami Raksha Committee (SKJRC - The Committee to Save the Farmland of Singur) were held by the locally dominant Mahishya community, who are the chasjami malik (landholder) or owner-cultivators of the region.

== Singur plant selection and protests ==
Singur was chosen by the company among six sites offered by the state government. The project faced massive opposition from displaced farmers. The unwilling farmers were given political support by West Bengal's then opposition leader Mamata Banerjee. Banerjee's "Save Farmland" movement was supported by environmental activists like Medha Patkar, Anuradha Talwar and Arundhati Roy. Banerjee's movement against displacement of farmers was also supported by several Kolkata based intellectuals like Aparna Sen, Kaushik Sen, Shaonli Mitra, Mahasweta Devi, Kabir Suman, Miratun Nehar and Subhaprasanna. Leftist activists also shared the platform with Banerjee's Trinamool Congress. The Tatas finally decided to move out of Singur on 3 October 2008. Ratan Tata blamed agitation by Banerjee and her supporters for the pullout decision. On 7 October 2008, the Tatas announced that they would be setting up the Tata Nano plant in Sanand, Gujarat.

== Background ==
The rapid rise in the population of West Bengal has not been accompanied by significant economic growth. Key indicators such as unemployment rates, poverty rates, infant mortality rates, job growth rates, per capita income, mobile phone penetration rates lag the more industrialized states of India. Local politicians gained power by promising agricultural land to landless farmers, but given West Bengal's population density, the land-holdings are small and the yields are insufficient to sustain poor families. While the shift from agriculture to industrial jobs requires re-training, given India's economic growth, it provides an opportunity for earning higher income.

Several other states had offered land to Tata Motors for the project.

The people staying in the proposed land were forced to evacuate by the government. The compensation given was considered inadequate and the new housing facilities offered were delayed. This led to the protest of the peasants backed by opposition political parties.

The company had made substantial promises. According to their claims, Singur would become a mini-auto city and approximately 70 vendors would set up shop along with the factory. The total investment planned is to the tune of Rs 1,000 crore. The project had, however, generated controversy right from the start, particularly on the question of state acquisition of fertile agricultural land for private enterprise.

=== The land acquisition controversy ===
On 23 September 2008, Tatas decided to leave Singur in West Bengal, the decision is reported to have been made by the Tata management and the West Bengal government had been informed. On 3 October it became official that TATA will leave Singur (WB) when Ratan Tata announced it in a press conference in Kolkata.

While the ruling party has gone all out for acquisition of 997 acres (4.03 km^{2}) of multi-crop land required for the car factory, questions have been raised about the party forcible acquisition which was made under the colonial Land Acquisition Act of 1894. Others say the provisions of this act were allegedly not been met.

The law has provisions for state taking over privately held land for public purposes but not for developing private businesses. The illegality of the acquisition has been substantially conceded by the Kolkata High Court.

The Tata Motors site is the most fertile one in the whole of the Singur, and the Singur block, in turn, is among the most highly fertile in West Bengal. Consequently, almost the entire local population depends on agriculture with approximately 15000 making their livelihood directly from it. With the number of direct jobs to be created no more than about 1,000, many of which are expected to go to outsiders, the local populace felt threatened for their livelihood. Environmental degradation is also feared.

Chief protesters include the opposition parties spearheaded by the Trinamool Congress under Mamata Banerjee and Socialist Unity Centre of India. The movement has received widespread support from civil rights and human rights groups, legal bodies, social activists like Medha Patkar and Anuradha Talwar, Booker Prize-winning author Arundhati Roy and Magsaysay and Jnanpith Award-winning author Mahasweta Devi. Other intellectuals, writers like the poet Ruchit Shah, artists like Subhaprasanna, theatre and film personalities like Shaoli Mitra, Aparna Sen etc. have pitched in. The state police force has been used to restrict their access to the area. The Nobel Laureate Amartya Sen supported the idea of factory but he however opposed forcible acquisition of land.

Preliminary surveys by officials of the state and Tata Motors faced protests, and manhandling on one occasion, from the villagers organized under the Save Singur Farmland Committee with Trinamool Congress forming its chief component. It is reported that Naxalite elements hold sway over the direction the agitation takes and the Trinamool Congress chief Mamata Banerjee takes no decisions without consulting them.

The state government imposed the prohibitory Section 144 of the Indian Penal Code for initially a month and then extended it indefinitely. The imposition has been declared illegal by the Kolkata High Court

While landless peasants and sharecroppers fear losing out entirely, sections of the locals, particularly those owing allegiance to the CPI(M) have welcomed the factory. These count chiefly among the owners of bigger portions of the land even as discrimination in the compensation has been alleged.

A section of those promised jobs at the factory have boycotted classes while training in protest against the alleged going back on the promise.

In the 2011 state assembly elections, while the sitting Trinamool Congress MLA, Rabindranath Bhattacharya retained the Singur seat, Becharam Manna, the convener of Krishi Jami Raksha Samiti, won the adjoining Haripal seat.

=== Fencing off the land ===
The land earmarked for the project was taken control of by the state administration amidst protests and fencing off commenced on 1 December 2006. Mamata Banerjee, who was prevented from entering Singur by the state police, called a statewide bandh in protest while legislators belonging to her party turned violent in the legislative assembly causing damage to furniture. Later, she went on a 26-day hunger strike . During this period she presented affidavits of farmers apparently unwilling to part with their land. On 4 December, Banerjee began the historic 26-day hunger strike in Kolkata protesting the forcible acquisition of farmland by the government. The then-President A. P. J. Abdul Kalam, who was concerned about her health, spoke to the then-Prime Minister Manmohan Singh to resolve the issue. Kalam also appealed to Ms Banerjee to withdraw her fast as "life is precious". A letter from Manmohan Singh was faxed to Gopalkrishna Gandhi, the then-Governor of West Bengal, and then it was immediately delivered to Mamata. After receiving the letter Mamata finally broke her fast at midnight on 29 December.

The fenced off area has been regularly guarded, besides large contingents of policemen, by cadres of the CPI(M) party. They were accused of the multiple rape followed by burning to death of teenage villager Tapasi Malik who was active in the protests, on 18 December 2006. Negligence and political interference in the probe into her death have been alleged. Later, CPI(M) activist Debu Malik and based on his statement, CPI(M) zonal committee secretary Suhrid Dutta were arrested by the Central Bureau of Investigation in connection with the crime.

Intermittent attacks by villagers have since continued on the fence. However, continuing agitations against the project appeared to have proved ineffective and a farmer who lost land committed suicide.

On the other hand, the pro-factory villagers siding with the CPI(M) have made accusations against the Naxalite faction of the 'Save Singur Farmland Committee' of threats and violence against them.

=== Construction of plant ===
Tatas ceremonially initiated the construction of the plant on 21 January 2007. The Tata Group announced on 3 October 2008 that they are pulling out of Singur due to the political unrest and agitation.

=== Procedural lacunae ===
Other aspects of the process of setting up the factory that had come under severe criticism are the government's secrecy on the details of the deal and the chief minister's furnishing of false information, including in the legislative assembly Vidhan Sabha. In particular, the concessions being given to Tata Motors have not been publicly revealed. The falsehoods of the chief minister chiefly pertain to claims made by him of having acquired 912 acres (3.69 km^{2}) through voluntary consent of the owners without the use of force.

The Kolkata High Court declared the acquisition prima facie illegal. The air seemed to have cleared somewhat when the High Court ordered the state government to submit correct figures following which an affidavit but was not satisfied with the result. In an affidavit filed later in June 2007, the government admitted to 30 per cent of the land was acquired from farmers without consent. The affidavit remains unclear on whether the lack of consent is based on insufficiency of the compensation or refusal to sell altogether.

== Project relocation to Gujarat ==
On 3 October 2008, after a meeting with West Bengal Chief Minister Buddhadeb Bhattacharjee, Tata Group chairman Ratan Tata announced the decision to relocate the Nano project from Singur, West Bengal, citing ongoing protests and political opposition led by the Trinamool Congress under Mamata Banerjee, who called for the return of land to displaced farmers.

Following the announcement, the then Chief Minister of Gujarat, Narendra Modi, invited Tata Motors to establish the plant in the state. Modi reportedly sent a message to Ratan Tata reading "Suswagatham" (meaning "welcome"), to encourage the relocation to Gujarat.

Tata Motors subsequently built a new factory in Sanand, Gujarat, completing construction in 14 months, compared to the 28 months taken for the Singur facility.

== Supreme Court verdict and land restoration ==
On 31 August 2016, the Supreme Court of India set aside the West Bengal government's acquisition of 997 acres of agricultural land in Singur for Tata Motors' Nano project, declaring the acquisition illegal.

The Court directed the state government to take possession of the land and return it to 9,117 landowners. Following the verdict, the West Bengal government reclaimed the land and initiated its redistribution to the original owners.

== Arbitration and compensation award ==
In early 2017, Tata Motors sought compensation of ₹934 crore from the West Bengal Industrial Development Corporation (WBIDC) for losses incurred after relocating the Nano project to Sanand, Gujarat in 2008, citing sunk costs and accrued interest.

On 30 October 2023, a three-member arbitral tribunal unanimously awarded Tata Motors ₹766 crore (approximately US$103 million) plus 11% annual interest in compensation for its losses related to the abandoned Singur facility. The tribunal found in favour of Tata Motors after reviewing the company’s investment of over ₹1,800 crore in establishing the Singur plant before the project’s cancellation.

== See also ==
- Tata Motors
- Tata Group
