= POSCO India =

Korean subsidiary in India

POSCO India Private Limited
- Type: Subsidiary of POSCO
- Industry: Steel
- Founded: Bhubaneswar, Odisha, India (25 August 2005)
- Headquarters: Bhubaneswar, Odisha, India
- Key people: Yong Won Yoon, Chairman & managing director
- Parent: POSCO

POSCO India Private Limited (commonly POSCO India or Posco-India) is an Indian subsidiary of Korean conglomerate POSCO.

Its parent company POSCO signed a memorandum of understanding in June 2005 with the state government of Odisha to construct a $12 billion steel plant. Various regulatory delays and controversies prevented the company from starting construction. The memorandum expired in June 2011, and as of April 2012, it has not been renewed. Apart from Odisha, POSCO India has project sites in the Karnataka and Maharashtra states.

== History ==
POSCO signed a memorandum of understanding (MoU) in June 2005, to incorporate an Indian subsidiary and build a steel plant in Odisha. Posco India was incorporated by POSCO in August 2005 with the Registrar of Companies, Odisha, under India's Companies Act, 1956.

=== Odisha ===
According to the MoU of 2005, POSCO agreed to invest in the Jagatsinghpur district of Odisha to establish an integrated plant to manufacture steel, mine iron ore and other ores, as well as the infrastructure necessary for its operation in Odisha. The MoU listed the following understanding between POSCO and the state of Odisha:

- Establish a FINEX/BF plant in phases. The first phase would be completed in two modules, together attracting a total of Rs. 218 billion ($5.1 billion) investment. The first phase would produce 6 million tons per year of crude steel, and 5.64 million tons per year of finished steel. The MoU mentioned a second phase, also to be completed in steps of two modules, together attracting a total of Rs. 215 billion ($5 billion) investment. The second phase would double the plant's capacity to 12 million tons per year of crude steel, and 11.28 million tons per year of finished steel.
- The state of Odisha promised to be a partner in development. The state agreed to acquire and provide three land parcels to POSCO: about 25 acres (10 ha) of land in Bhubaneswar for POSCO India to establish its Indian headquarters; about 4,000 acres (1,600 ha) in the state of Odisha to set up a steel plant, build port infrastructure, establish a storage yard for coking coal, and other associated facilities; and, about 2000 acres of land for POSCO to develop a township, recreational activities and all related social infrastructure – of which approximately 1,500 acres (610 ha) would be identified adjacent/near to the Steel project and remaining 500 acres (200 ha) near the mining location.
- The state of Odisha agreed to work with the central government of India to arrange necessary supplies and infrastructure for steel production by POSCO India. These supplies included water, electrical power, drainage and sewerage, licenses and permits to obtain coal and iron ore, rail links, and a highway road connection.
- POSCO India agreed to conduct a rapid Environment Impact Assessment (EIA) and prepare a detailed EIA Report and an Environment Management Plan (EMP) for the Project. The Government of Odisha agreed to provide any assistance requested by the company during the time the EIA is conducted and the EMP is prepared. The state of Odisha also agreed in the MoU to use its best efforts to procure the grant of all environmental approvals and forest clearances from the central government of India within the minimum possible time for the project.

From June 2012, controversies and regulatory delays have prevented Posco India's Odisha project to proceed beyond the concept. Posco India has no mining or manufacturing operations in Odisha

=== Karnataka ===
In addition to its attempt to establish a steel plant Odisha, Posco-India considered alternate sites for a steel plant. In June 2010, Posco signed a memorandum of understanding with the state of Karnataka at the Global Investors Meet in Bangalore. This memorandum envisions a 6 MMT per year steel plant based on Posco's high efficiency, low environment impact FINEX technology. In May 2011, under mandated stock exchange disclosurer rules, Posco confirmed the memorandum of understanding for the steel works in the state of Karnataka; with a cautionary note that POSCO has not made any decisive plans to implement the Project due to the fact that the Government of Karnataka has yet to confirm certain investment plans for the Project.

The government of Karnataka took a different approach to land acquisition for Posco project than the government of Odisha. The state of Karnataka announced that it will not acquire land on a lot-by-lot basis, rather the land acquisition will be on complete consensus, on all-or-none, and will involve simultaneous negotiations at multiple locations in different parts of the state of Karnataka. In July 2011, the state of Karnataka announced that it is currently working on land acquisition for Posco-India project in the following districts: Gadag, Bagalkot, Bijapur, Raichur and Yadgir.

== Controversies ==
Posco India expected to start steel plant construction promptly after signing the 2005 MoU. However, the company was unable to start construction because of social and environmental controversies.

A year after the 2005 MoU was signed, India's parliament passed a new law, which directly affected Posco-India. This law, The Scheduled Tribes and Other Traditional Forest Dwellers (Recognition of Forest Rights) Act, 2006, is also commonly called as the Forests Rights Act. The law granted certain rights to forest-dwelling communities in India, including the use of forest land and other resources. This law has been controversial and is opposed by environmentalists and wildlife conservationists, who petition that the law makes it impossible to protect forests from human presence and use, and for the purposes of ecological and wildlife conservation. The Forests Rights Act was published in 2007, and became effective in 2008. This law was retroactively applied to the Posco-India project.

India's Supreme Court examined the facts related to the state government of Odisha's initiatives to enter into MoU to encourage economic growth in the state, and whether such development meets the intent of ecological and environmental laws of India. On 8 August 2008, the Supreme Court ruled in favour of the state of Odisha, in Case Law I.A. number 2134 of 2007, titled T.N. Godavaraman Thirumulpad vs. Union of India, State of Odisha and others. In their ruling, the Supreme Court justices wrote, "the State of Odisha [is] to be associated with Special Purpose Vehicle in order to ensure implementation of proper schemes for the development of the tribal area and in our Order it has not been suggested for incorporation of the Special Purpose Vehicle to take over the mines which have been leased out by State of Odisha to the lessee. The reason is obvious. We cannot change leases/MoUs/joint venture agreements signed between the parties at earlier point of time which have been approved by the Ministry of Mines, Government of India, and other Authorities. The object for passing the order was to strike a balance between development and environmental protection. The Lanjigarh tehsil in Kalahandi district, as stated in our Order dated 23.11.07, faces abject poverty. At the same time the area is eco-sensitive area. We have tried to strike a balance in order to subserve the principle of Sustainable Development."

The August 2008 ruling by Supreme Court of India also instructed the Ministry of Environment and Forests (MoEF) of India to examine, and then if appropriate, grant approval under the law. The Ministry of Environment and Forests of India accepted the ruling and examined the facts and reviewed the facts under Indian laws, including the Forests Rights Act. The review process included a committee that visited Odisha many times, including the Posco-India's planned site, the villages, the Forests covering the proposed plant site and iron ore mining area, environmentalists, ecologists, social activists, farmers, and families that may be affected by the proposed Posco-India initiative. The review process by Ministry of Environment and Forests of India took over 2.5 years.

=== N. C. Saxena committee ===
In July 2010, a nineteen-member NC Saxena committee visited Odisha and made a very public denouncement about the non-recognition of forest rights by the Government of Odisha and violation of the Forest Rights Act, in the forest areas proposed to be diverted for the POSCO India project. The committee urged that Ministry of Environment and Forests of Government of India to withdraw the clearance given to the State Government for diversion of the forest land. In August 2010, the Ministry of Environment and Forests of the Government of India, in response to the claims of NC Saxena committee, issued a stop work order. The order directed that all land acquisition and transfer for Posco India project, including handing over of the forest and non-forest land be stopped forthwith, and details submitted to the Ministry. The state government of Odisha and Posco India respected the stop work order from the central government of India.

=== Meena Gupta committee ===
Later, a four-member Meena Gupta committee was appointed by the Government of India. This committee claimed to have conducted intensive enquiry by consulting a large number of documents, field visits and meeting a large number of people (including officials of Odisha government, local affected inhabitants, NGOs and civil society and experts in concerned fields). The committee after examining various social, ecological and environmental issues, returned a split report to the government of India in October 2010:

- Meena Gupta, the committee chairperson, acknowledged that the Scheduled Tribes enjoy an important Constitutional status in India, and disturbing or displacing them stands on a different footing from displacement of other people. She claimed Posco India plant, is planned to be located in a coastal district which is not a Scheduled Area and has virtually no Scheduled Tribe people. The people to be displaced are mostly agricultural and fishermen families (about 700 families). In the report, she claimed that while Posco India is to be located on land classified as forest land, this area recorded as forest is mainly sandy waste, with some scrub forest, apart from the casuarina plantations in the area.
- The other three members of the committee claimed that past satellite imagery data suggested current areas under casuarina plantation in the coastal areas were, in past, covered with mangroves. These forests were destroyed either during super cyclones or by illegal cutting. The members also claimed that 21 names from voter list of 2006, from the land proposed for Posco India, belonged to Scheduled Tribe protected by the Forests Rights Act of 2008.

After the government of Odisha and Posco India announced the MoU and its planned location in 2005, the opposition to the POSCO project was widespread in all the eight villages where it was supposed to be sited. Subsequently, a number of the villagers changed their opinion, according to the Meena Gupta report. The report claimed that the reason for change in opinion were: the realisation that not all eight villages but only two hamlets would be fully displaced, and a small part of Gadakujang; they also realised that most of the land that would be given was government land, not private land; the fairly liberal compensation package, and the possibility of jobs for their children in the future. As of October 2010, the report claimed, in almost every village, except one, the villagers are almost equally divided between supporters of the POSCO project and opponents of the project. One village, Dhinkia, however, has remained steadfastly opposed to the project; so much so that the villagers drove out of the village the few families that were favourably inclined towards the project. The villagers of Dhinkia also started, the report claimed, a blockade of the village to prevent government or POSCO officials from entering the village.

The Meena Gupta committee report claimed political controversy is part of the scene: the Communist Party of India (CPI) strongly opposes the project, the Communist Party of India – Marxist (CPM) is not opposed to the project if it is shifted a little and if Paradeep port is used instead of a separate captive port. Several other parties, across the spectrum, were not opposed to Posco India, in fact they said they welcomed it, but the present location of Posco, the lack of consultation with other political parties, the issues of water to the plant were cited as some of the reasons for their objection. The Meena Gupta committee also report claimed the POSCO project is an integrated project encompassing different components like the township, pipeline, road and transportation etc. These, the committee claimed, have been left out of the scope of its initial environment impact analysis. Such partial environment impact analysis was insufficient, the full environmental impact of the entire project is necessary. One of the committee members, Dr. Suresh. sought a clarification from Posco India and the government of Odisha. Both of these parties along regional office of Ministry of Environment – Government of India cooperated and delivered a copy of comprehensive environmental impact analysis for steel plant, captive port and related infrastructure, to the Meena Gupta committee, as completed by July 2007. Some members of the committee note that this comprehensive environment impact analysis should have been completed in 2005, not in 2007. Three committee members claim that clearances granted in past should have been limited to the scope of the initial environment impact analysis of 2005 for 4 million tonne plant. The clearances for the entire 12 MMT plant and port, the committee suggests, should be based on the 2007 comprehensive environment impact analysis.

In October 2010, Posco India issued a press release in response to media coverage of Meena Gupta Committee report. The company categorically stated that it never violated any law or procedure for obtaining any governmental clearance whatsoever required for the project. Posco India further stated it has experienced an unexpected delay in initiating project work because certain circumstances, laws and legal procedures within India have been changing between 2005 and 2010. The company claimed that since the time of signing of the memorandum of understanding in 2005, it has set and followed high standards of environment protection and corporate governance, while involving all stakeholders.

=== 2011–2012 developments ===
On 31 January 2011, the Ministry of Environment and Forests of India gave final clearance to the Posco-India project, subject to the state of Odisha and Posco-India meeting additional conditions. The clearance document included the findings of its review. The Ministry of Environment and Forests, claiming the need to protect the environment, forests and those affected by Posco-India, included 60 new conditions on the project – 28 for the steel plant and 32 for the captive port.

The June 2005 MoU expired in June 2011. The state government of Odisha stated that it intends to replace the expired MoU, and sign a new and revised MoU with POSCO. As of September 2011, the MOU renewal remains a subject of negotiation between POSCO India and the state government of Odisha, because the state has proposed changes and new conditions to the original MOU signed in June 2005.

On 14 June 2011 Odisha government paused land acquisition at the proposed steel plant of Posco in Dhinkia gram panchayat (village). On 8 September 2011 Odisha High Court ruled that land acquisition is in public interest, allowed non-private land acquisition by state government for POSCO India to proceed, and ordered a continued pause on the acquisition of private land till further ruling.

On 25 November 2011 Abhay Sahu, the leader of the anti-Posco movement in Odisha, was arrested over his alleged involvement in several criminal cases. Sahu was the head of Posco Pratirodh Sangram Samiti (PPSS), a Communist Party of India backed organisation, that had been convincing villagers in Odisha and organising opposition to the Posco investment in Odisha. Police officials claimed Sahu was arrested over the death of a woman allegedly due to dowry demands. The police also claimed that there were additional criminal charges against Sahu. He was a member of Communist Party of India's state politburo, and in his direction PPSS was claimed to be the main hurdle to Posco India project in Odisha.

In 2012, POSCO India and Paradip Port Trust studied possibilities for using the existing Paradip Port facilities for steel export from the planned steel mill.

== Benefits from POSCO India project ==
India's National Council of Applied Economic Research completed and published in January 2007, its report on the social cost benefit analysis of Posco India project. This research team considered two alternatives: producing steel within the state of Odisha versus mining the iron ore, exporting it and importing the steel. The report claimed mining iron ore and producing steel locally in the state of Odisha is a

significantly better option for India, over the option of India exporting lower cost iron ore overseas, encouraging other countries to produce the steel, and then India importing the higher cost produced steel. The report also claims:

- an economic internal rate of return to India from the POSCO project to be 16.6%
- sensitivity analysis indicates that even in the worst-case scenario – sales 10 per cent lower than estimated – the economic return to India to be 13.9%.
- the economic impact of the Posco India steel plant alone, to India's population, to be Rs. 112 billion ($2.5 billion) assuming a discount rate of 12%.
- the project additionally will contribute direct and indirect taxes as the iron ore is mined, steel is produced, the metal is converted into products by Indian economy, and these steel products are consumed in various sectors of Indian economy. The report claims the Posco India project will produce an average of Rs. 249 billion per year ($5.44 billion per year) of steel for India's economy, contribute an average of Rs. 49.9 billion per year ($1.1 billion per year) of domestic sales taxes, capital goods taxes, value added taxes (VAT), iron ore duties, and employee income taxes, annually for 35 years, for the social programs of the central government of India and state government of Odisha. The report admits that its analysis is based on nominal numbers using 2007 basis, that it assumes constant steel prices at $450 per tonne through the year 2040, and ignores the effect of inflation in steel prices or in Indian economy. The carbon steel prices between January and July 2011 ranged between $815 and $910 per tonne.
- the POSCO India project's FINEX process, the report claims will be superior in preventing air pollution in India. It will be 10 times less polluting in sulphur oxides (SOx) emissions than currently used BF process in India. The POSCO process, the report claims, will also be 25 times less polluting in nitrogen oxides (NOx) and 5 times less polluting in particulate dust terms than the process currently used by steel plants of India.

These claimed benefits are disputed as incomplete. For example, activists claim that land acquisition for Posco India will adversely affect betel farmers who in recent decades encroached upon government land to farm betel leaves and claim to earn INR 10 to 1750,000 (US$30,000) per hectare per year from growing betel leaves for paan.
