= Patta (land deed) =

Legal term used in South Asia

Patta (Hindi: पट्टा) is a type of land deed issued by the government to an individual or organization. The term is used in India and certain other parts of South Asia for a small piece of land, granted by the government to an approved cultivator with a land revenue exemption. The period of exemption is what is required to bring the land under cultivation. These land deeds were associated with the process of land reform in India, after the colonial period. A person holding a patta is known as a pattadar.
