= Right to Fair Compensation and Transparency in Land Acquisition, Rehabilitation and Resettlement Act, 2013 =

Act of Indian Parliament

Parliament of India
- Long title: An Act to ensure, in consultation with institutions of local self-government and Gram Sabhas established under the Constitution, a humane, participative, informed and transparent process for land acquisition for industrialisation, development of essential infrastructural facilities and urbanisation with the least disturbance to the owners of the land and other affected families and provide just and fair compensation to the affected families whose land has been acquired or proposed to be acquired or are affected by such acquisition and make adequate provisions for such affected persons for their rehabilitation and resettlement and for ensuring that the cumulative outcome of compulsory acquisition should be that affected persons become partners in development leading to an improvement in their post–acquisition social and economic status and for matters connected therewith or incidental thereto.
- Citation: No. 30 of 2013
- Territorial extent: Whole of India
- Enacted by: Parliament of India
- Enacted: 29 August 2013 and 5 September 2013(Lok Sabha); 4 September 2013 (Rajya Sabha)
- Assented to: 27 September 2013
- Signed: 27 September 2013
- Commenced: 1 January 2014
- Bill citation: No. 77-C of 2011
- Committee report: 17 May 2012

Repeals
- Land Acquisition Act, 1894
- Status: In force

The Right to Fair Compensation and Transparency in Land Acquisition, Rehabilitation and Resettlement Act, 2013 (also Land Acquisition Act, 2013 or LARR Act or RFCTLARR Act) is an Act of Indian Parliament that regulates land acquisition and lays down the procedure and rules for granting compensation, rehabilitation and resettlement to the affected persons in India. The Act has provisions regarding fair compensation to those whose land is being acquired, brings transparency to the process of acquisition of land to set up factories or buildings, infrastructural projects and assures rehabilitation of those affected. The Act replaced the Land Acquisition Act, 1894 enacted during British rule.

The Land Acquisition, Rehabilitation and Resettlement Bill, 2011 was introduced in the Lok Sabha on 7 September 2011, which was passed by it on 29 August 2013 and by the Rajya Sabha on 4 September 2013. The bill then received the assent of the President of India on 27 September 2013. The Act came into force from 1 January 2014.

In December 2014 the Land Acquisition Ordinance 2014 was issued. An amendment bill was then introduced in Parliament. The Lok Sabha passed the amendment bill but not the Rajya Sabha. On 30 May 2015, President of India promulgated the amendment as an ordinance for third time. The Supreme Court refused to stay the ordinance following a public interest litigation. The amendment bill was referred to a joint parliamentary committee. The committee was not able to attain a consensus. The amendment bill lapsed.

== Background ==
=== History ===
The Land Acquisition Act, 1894 was a law passed by the Imperial Legislative Council, that governed the process of land acquisition in India until 2013 and continues to do so in Pakistan and Myanmar. It allows the acquisition of land for some public purpose by a government agency from individual landowners after paying a government-determined compensation to cover losses incurred by landowners from surrendering their land to the agency.

=== Need ===
The Government of India believed there was a heightened public concern on land acquisition issues in India. Of particular concern was that despite many amendments, over the years, to India's Land Acquisition Act of 1894, there was an absence of a cohesive national law that addressed fair compensation when private land is acquired for public use, and fair rehabilitation of land owners and those directly affected from loss of livelihoods. The Government of India believed that a combined law was necessary, one that legally requires rehabilitation and resettlement necessarily and simultaneously follow government acquisition of land for public purposes.

Forty-Fourth Amendment Act of 1978 omitted Art 19(1) (f) with the net result being:-

1. The right not to be deprived of one's property save by authority of law has since been no longer a fundamental right. "No person shall be deprived of his property saved by authority of law" (Constitution 44th Amendment, w.e.f. 10.6.1979). The amendment ensured that the right to property‟ is no more a fundamental right but rather a constitutional/legal right/as a statutory right and in the event of breach, the remedy available to an aggrieved person is through the High Court under Article 226 of the Indian Constitution and not the Supreme Court under Article 32 of the Constitution. .
2. Moreover, no one can challenge the reasonableness of the restriction imposed by any law the legislature made to deprive the person of his property.

State must pay compensation at the market value for such land, building or structure acquired (Inserted by Constitution, Seventeenth Amendment Act, 1964), the same can be found in the earlier rulings when property right was a fundamental right (such as 1954 AIR 170, 1954 SCR 558, which propounded that the word "Compensation" deployed in Article 31(2) implied full compensation, that is the market value of the property at the time of the acquisition. The Legislature must "ensure that what is determined as payable must be compensation, that is, a just equivalent of what the owner has been deprived of"). Elsewhere, Justice O Chinnappa Reddy ruled (State of Maharashtra v. Chandrabhan Tale on 7 July 1983) that the fundamental right to property has been abolished because of its incompatibility with the goals of "justice" social, economic and political and "equality of status and of opportunity" and with the establishment of "a socialist democratic republic, as contemplated by the Constitution. There is no reason why a new concept of property should be introduced in the place of the old so as to bring in its wake the vestiges of the doctrine of Laissez Faire and create, in the name of efficiency, a new oligarchy. Efficiency has many facets and one is yet to discover an infallible test of efficiency to suit the widely differing needs of a developing society such as ours" (1983 AIR 803, 1983 SCR (3) 327) (Dey Biswas 2014, 14-15 footnote).

The Land Acquisition, Rehabilitation and Resettlement Bill, 2011 was introduced in Lok Sabha. Two bills on similar lines were introduced in Lok Sabha in 2007. These Bills lapsed with the dissolution of the 14th Lok Sabha.

== Discussion of bill ==
=== Provisions ===
==== Definition of public purpose ====
Section 2(1) of the Act defines the following as public purpose for land acquisition within India:

- For strategic purposes relating to naval, military, air force, and armed forces of the Union, including central paramilitary forces or any work vital to national security or defence of India or State police, safety of the people; or *For corridor purpose railway
- For infrastructure projects, which includes the following, namely:
  - All activities or items listed in the notification of the Government of India in the Department of Economic Affairs (Infrastructure Section) number 13/6/2009-INF, dated 27 March 2012, excluding private hospitals, private educational institutions and private hotels;
  - Projects involving agro-processing, supply of inputs to agriculture, warehousing, cold storage facilities, marketing infrastructure for agriculture and allied activities such as dairy, fisheries, and meat processing, set up or owned by the appropriate Government or by a farmers' cooperative or by an institution set up under a statute;
  - Project for industrial corridors or mining activities, national investment and manufacturing zones, as designated in the National Manufacturing Policy;
  - Project for water harvesting and water conservation structures, sanitation;
  - Project for Government administered, Government aided educational and research schemes or institutions;
  - Project for sports, health care, tourism, transportation of space programme;
  - Any infrastructure facility as may be notified in this regard by the Central Government and after tabling of such notification in Parliament;
- Project for project affected families;
- Project for housing, or such income groups, as may be specified from time to time by the appropriate Government;
- Project for planned development or the improvement of village sites or any site in the urban areas or provision of land for residential purposes for the weaker sections in rural and urban areas;
- Project for residential purposes to the poor or landless or to persons residing in areas affected by natural calamities, or to persons displaced or affected by reason of the implementation of any scheme undertaken by the Government, any local authority or a corporation owned or controlled by the State.

When government declares public purpose and shall control the land directly, consent of the land owner shall not be required. However, when the government acquires the land for private companies, the consent of at least 80% of the project affected families shall be obtained through a prior informed process before government uses its power under the Act to acquire the remaining land for public good, and in case of a public-private project at least 70% of the affected families should consent to the acquisition process.

The Act includes an urgency clause for expedited land acquisition. The urgency clause may only be invoked for national defense, security and in the event of rehabilitation of affected people from natural disasters or emergencies.

==== Definition of 'land owner' ====
The Act defines the following as land owner:

1. person whose name is recorded as the owner of the land or building or part thereof, in the records of the authority concerned; or
2. person who is granted forest rights under The Scheduled Tribes and Other Traditional Forest Dwellers (Recognition of Forest Rights) Act, 2006 or under any other law for the time being in force; or
3. person who is entitled to be granted Patta rights on the land under any law of the State including assigned lands; or
4. any person who has been declared as such by an order of the court or Authority;

==== Limits on acquisition ====
The Act forbids land acquisition when such acquisition would include multi-crop irrigated area. However such acquisition may be permitted on demonstrable last resort, which will be subjected to an aggregated upper limit for all the projects in a District or State as notified by the State Government. In addition to the above condition, wherever multi-crop irrigated land is acquired an equivalent area of cultivable wasteland shall be developed by the state for agricultural purposes. In other type of agricultural land, the total acquisition shall not exceed the limit for all the projects in a District or State as notified by the Appropriate Authority. These limits shall not apply to linear projects which includes projects for railways, highways, major district roads, power lines, and irrigation canals.

=== Compensation ===
Compensation under this Act provides for resettlement and rehabilitation of people affected by displacement and acquisition of land under the act.

==== Rehabilitation and resettlement ====
For land owners, the Bill provides:

- an additional subsistence allowance of ₹38,000 (US$800) for the first year - may be
- an additional entitlement of a job to the family member, or a payment of ₹5,00,000 (US$11,000) up front, or a monthly annuity totaling ₹24,000 (US$550) per year for 20 years with adjustment for inflation – the option from these three choices shall be the legal right of the affected land owner family, not the land acquirer
- an additional upfront compensation of ₹50,000 (US$1,100) for transportation
- an additional upfront resettlement allowance of ₹50,000(US$1,100)
- if the land owner loses a home in a rural area, then an additional entitlement of a house with no less than 50 square meters in plinth area
- if the land is acquired for urbanization, 20% of the developed land will be reserved and offered to land owning families, in proportion to their land acquired and at a price equal to cost of acquisition plus cost of subsequent development
- if acquired land is resold without development, 20% of the appreciated land value shall be mandatorily shared with the original owner whose land was acquired

In addition to the above compensation and entitlements under the proposed LARR 2011, scheduled caste and schedule tribe (SC/ST) families will be entitled to several other additional benefits per Schedule II of the proposed bill. India has over 250 million people protected and classified as SC/ST, about 22% of its total population. The proposed additional benefits to these families include:

- an additional land grant of 2.5 acres per affected family
- an additional assistance of ₹50,000 (US$1,100)
- free land for community and social gatherings, and special Schedule V and VI benefits

Schedule III of LARR 2011 proposes additional amenities over and beyond those outlined above. Schedule III proposes that the land acquirer shall provide 25 additional services to families affected by the land acquisition. Some examples of the 25 additional services include schools, health centres, roads, safe drinking water, child support services, places of worship, burial and cremation grounds, post offices, fair price shops, and storage facilities.

LARR Bill 2011 proposes that Schedule II through VI shall apply even when private companies willingly buy land from willing sellers, without any involvement of the government.

The Bill as drafted mandates compensation and entitlements without limit to number of claimants. Thus, for clarity and as an example, if 1000 acres of rural land is to be acquired for a project, with market price of ₹2,25,000 per acre (US$5000 per acre), 100 families claim to be land owners, and 5 families per acre claim their rights as livelihood losers under the proposed LARR 2011 Bill, the total cost to acquire the 1000 acre would be

- Land compensation = ₹90,00,00,000 (US$20,000,000)
- Land owner entitlements = ₹6,30,00,000 (US$1,400,000) + 100 replacement homes
- Livelihood loser entitlements = ₹365,00,00,000 (US$70,000,000) + 5000 replacement homes

The average effective cost of land, in the above example will be at least ₹41,00,000 (US$91,400) per acre plus replacement homes and additional services per Schedule III to VI of the proposed bill. Even if the pre-acquisition average market price for land were just ₹22,500 per acre (US$500 per acre) in the above example, the proposed R&R, other entitlements and Schedule III to VI would raise the effective cost of land to at least ₹33,03,000 (US$73,400) per acre.

The LARR Bill of 2011 proposes the above benchmarks as minimum. The state governments of India, or private companies, may choose to set and implement a policy that pays more than the minimum proposed by LARR 2011.

For context purposes, the proposed land prices because of compensation and R&R LARR 2011 may be compared with land prices elsewhere in the world:

- According to The Financial Times, in 2008, the farmland prices in France were Euro 6,000 per hectare ($2,430 per acre; ₹1,09,350 per acre).
- According to the United States Department of Agriculture, as of January 2010, the average farmland value in the United States was $2,140 per acre (₹96,300 per acre). The farmland prices in the United States varied between different parts of the country, ranging from $480 per acre to $4,690 per acre.

A 2010 report by the Government of India, on labour whose livelihood depends on agricultural land, claims that, per 2009 data collected across all states in India, the all-India annual average daily wage rates in agricultural occupations ranged between ₹53 and 117 per day for men working in farms (US$354 to 780 per year), and between ₹41 and 72 per day for women working in farms (US$274 to 480 per year). This wage rate in rural India study included the following agricultural operations common in India: ploughing, sowing, weeding, transplanting, harvesting, winnowing, threshing, picking, herdsmen, tractor driver, unskilled help, mason, etc.

==== Issues and expectations regarding compensation ====
===== Issues =====
1. Compensation criteria are not understandable/clear
2. Compensation prices variation place to place
3. Compensation as per newly amended bill is not distributed (Under below mentioned circumstances)

===== Example =====
1. Land acquired in the period bill is under discussion in parliament.
2. Not many changes are done in bill after parliamentary discussions and LARR 2011 bill passed with marginal changes.
3. Large land acquisition are done by government/others during the period bill is under discussion in parliament.
4. During this period LARR 2011 bill under discussion, Compensation is as per previous Land acquisition bill (Poor farmers lost their lands in unfair/ unfavorable condition)
5. Multiplication factors in rural and urban area are added rather than increasing the base Land cost (Land is most essential component for any infrastructure geographically, socially, economically, as per terrain available with/without resources)

===== Expectations =====
1. Bill recommendation to be implemented as dated bill appeared in parliament.(2011)
2. Compensation should be time bound and to amount to be released with is a time frame / as per bill recommendations.
3. Fair compensation including life time productive income from land to Farmer/land owner (Till date he/she or family holding land)
4. Land Holding & maintenance cost to farmers/Land owners (as per current date land situation) till land acquired by government/others (As crop price are also not favorable to farmers in compression to other item in economy)

=== Benefits and effects ===
The 2013 Act is expected to affect rural families in India whose primary livelihood is derived from farms. The Act will also affect urban households in India whose land or property is acquired.

Per an April 2010 report, over 50% of Indian population (about 60 crore people) derived its livelihood from farm lands. With an average rural household size of 5.5, LARR Bill 2011 R&R entitlement benefits may apply to about 10.9 crore rural households in India.

According to Government of India, the contribution of agriculture to Indian economy's gross domestic product has been steadily dropping with every decade since its independence. As of 2009, about 15.7% of India's GDP is derived from agriculture. Act will mandate higher payments for land as well as guaranteed entitlements from India's non-agriculture-derived GDP to the people supported by agriculture-derived GDP. It is expected that the Act will directly affect 13.2 crore hectares (32.6 crore acres) of rural land in India, over 10 crore land owners, with an average land holding of about 3 acres per land owner. Families whose livelihood depends on farming land, the number of livelihood-dependent families per acre varies widely from season to season, demands of the land, and the nature of crop.

Act provides to compensate rural households – both land owners and livelihood losers. The Act goes beyond compensation, it mandates guaranteed series of entitlements to rural households affected. According to a July 2011 report from the Government of India, the average rural household per capita expenditure/income in 2010, was ₹928 per month (US$252 per year).

For a typical rural household that owns the average of 3 acres of land, the Act will replace the loss of annual average per capita income of ₹11,136 for the rural household, with:

- four times the market value of the land, and
- an upfront payment of ₹1,36,000 (US$3,000) for subsistence, transportation and resettlement allowances, and
- an additional entitlement of a job to the family member, or a payment of ₹5,00,000 (US$11,000) up front, or a monthly annuity totaling ₹24,000 (US$550) per year for 20 years with adjustment for inflation – the option from these three choices shall be the legal right of the affected land owner family, not the land acquirer, and
- a house with no less than 50 square meters in plinth area, and
- additional benefits may apply if the land is resold without development, used for urbanization, or if the land owner belongs to SC/ST or other protected groups per rules of the Government of India

If the affected families on the above rural land demand 100% upfront compensation from the land acquirer, and the market value of land is ₹1,00,000 per acre, the Act mandates the land acquirer to offset the loss of an average per capita 2010 income of ₹11,136 per year created by this 3 acre of rural land, with the following:

- ₹18,36,000 (US$41,727) to the rural land owner; which is the total of R&R allowances of ₹6,36,000 plus ₹12,00,000 – which is four times the market value of the land, plus
- a house with no less than 50 square metres in plinth area and benefits from Schedule III-VI as applicable to the rural land owner, plus
- additional payments of ₹6,36,000 each to any additional families claiming to have lost its livelihood because of the acquisition, even if they do not own the land

The effects of LARR Bill 2011, in certain cases, will apply retroactively to pending and incomplete projects. land acquisition for all linear projects such as highways, irrigation canals, railways, ports and others.

=== Criticisms ===
The proposed Bill, LARR 2011, is being criticized on a number of fronts:

- Some criticize the Act citing that it is heavily loaded in favour of land owners and ignores the needs of poor Indians who need affordable housing, impoverished families who need affordable hospitals, schools, employment opportunities and infrastructure and industries.
- Some economists suggest that it attaches an arbitrary mark-up to the historical market price to determine compensation amounts, along with its numerous entitlements to potentially unlimited number of claimants. This according to them shall guarantee neither social justice nor the efficient use of resources.
- LARR 2011 as proposed mandates that compensation and rehabilitation payments to land owners and livelihood losers be upfront. This misaligns the interests of land acquirer and those affected. Once the payment is made, one or more of the affected families may seek to delay the progress of the project to extract additional compensation, thereby adversely affecting those who chose long term employment in the affected families. The Bill, these economists suggest, should link compensation and entitlements to the progress and success of the project, such as through partial compensation in form of land bonds. These success-linked infrastructure bonds may also help poor states reduce the upfront cost of land acquisition for essential public projects such as hospitals, schools, universities, affordable housing, clean drinking water treatment plants, electricity power generation plants, sewage treatment plants, flood control reservoirs, and highways necessary to bring relief to affected public during fires, epidemics, earthquakes, floods and other natural disasters. The state of Kerala has decided to pursue the use of infrastructure bonds as a form of payment to land owners.
- LARR 2011 places no limit on total compensation or number of claimants; nor does it place any statute of limitations on claims or claimants. The beneficiaries of the Bill, with guaranteed jobs for 26 years, will have no incentive to be productive. The Bill should place a limit on total value of entitlement benefits that can be annually claimed per acre, this entitlement pool should then be divided between the affected families, and the government should run this program if it is considered to be fair.
- LARR 2011 as proposed severely curtails free market transactions between willing sellers and willing buyers. For example, DLF Limited – India's largest real estate developer – claims that the current bill may limit private companies such as DLF from developing affordable housing for millions of Indians. DLF suggests that direct land transactions with owners on a willing voluntary basis, at market-determined rate, should be kept out of the purview of the bill. There should be no conditions imposed on free market transactions between willing sellers and willing buyers.
- An article in The Wall Street Journal claims that the proposed LARR 2011 rules will apply even when any private company acquires 100 acres of land or more. For context, POSCO India seeks about 4000 acres for its US$12 billion proposed steel manufacturing plant in the Indian state of Orissa. In most cases, even small companies planning US$10-US$300 million investment, seeking 100 or more acres will be affected by the compensation plus rehabilitation effort and expenses of LARR 2011. The WSJ article further claims that the proposed LARR 2011 bill doesn't actually define the word "acquisition," and leaves open a loophole that could allow government agencies to continue banking land indefinitely.
- The Observer Research Foundation's Sahoo argues that the bill fails to adequately define "public purpose". The current definition, he claims, can be interpreted vaguely. In leaving public purpose too vague and porous, it would ensure that land acquisition will remain hostage to politics and all kinds of disputes. More clarity is needed, perhaps with the option that each state have the right to hold a referendum, whereby the voters in the state can vote to approve or disapprove proposed public purpose land acquisitions through the referendum, as is done through local elections in the United States for certain public acquisition of private or agricultural land.
- The Confederation of Real Estate Developers' Association of India claims that the proposed LARR 2011 bill is kind of one-sided, its ill-thought-out entitlements may sound very altruistic and pro-poor, but these are unsustainable and will kill the goose that lays the golden egg. This group further claims that the bill, if passed, will increase the cost of acquisition of land to unrealistic level. It will be almost impossible to acquire 50-acre or 100-acre land at one place for planned development. They suggest that if India does not facilitate urbanization in an organized manner, all the incremental population will be housed in disorganized housing developments such as slums with dire consequences for Indian economy. In the long run, even farmers will suffer as fringe development of urban centres will largely be in the form of unauthorized developments and they will not realize the true economic potential of their lands.
- The bill inflates the cost of land to help a small minority of Indians at the cost of the vast majority of Indian citizens, as less than 10% of Indian population owns rural or urban land., The LARR Bill 2011 favours a privileged minority of land owners as the Bill mandates above market prices for their land plus an expensive rehabilitation package. The Bill does not mandate a process by which the time involved in land acquisition is reduced from current levels of years. Nor does the Bill consider the effect of excessive costs upfront, and expensive rehabilitation mandate over time, on the financial feasibility of large-scale, socially necessary infrastructure projects needed by 90%+ of Indians who are not landowners. In an editorial, Vidya Bala writes that the most important weakness in the Bill is bringing non-government transactions too under its purview. Private players buying 50+ acres of urban land tracts or 100+ acres of rural areas would be required to comply with the R&R package stated in the Bill.
- LARR 2011 Bill's sections 97, 98 and 99 are incongruous with other laws of India in details and intent. Section 98, for example, says that the provisions of the Bill shall not apply to the enactments relating to land acquisition specified in the Fourth Schedule of the Bill. According to Indian Legal Code, the Fourth Schedule referred to by LARR 2011 Bill, consists of 16 bills, including the ancient monuments and archaeological sites and remains Act, 1958, the atomic energy Act, 1962, the special economic zones Act, 2005, the cantonments Act, 2006, the railways Act, 1989 amongst others. Laws can not be in conflict with each other. LARR Bill carve outs through Sections 97, 98 and 99 add confusion, offering a means for numerous citizen petitions, lawsuits and judicial activism. The LARR 2011 Bill thus fails to deliver on the goals motivating it.

== See also ==
- Eminent domain
- Public use
- Land bonds
- 2011 land acquisition protests in Uttar Pradesh
- POSCO India
