= Lakshman Kumar Mahapatra =

Indian anthropologist (1929–2020)

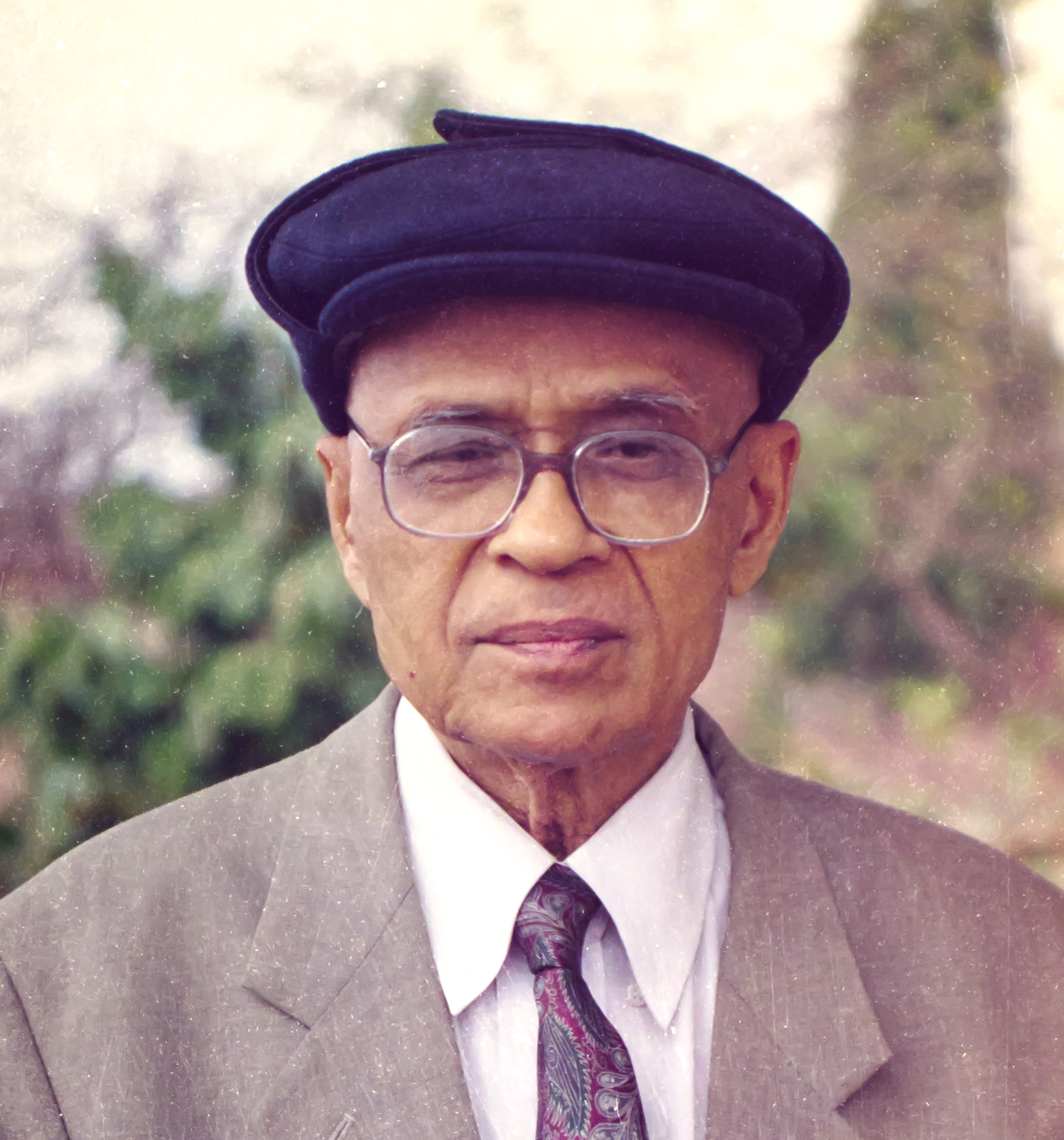
- Lakshman Kumar Mahapatra
- Born: 29 October 1929; Nilagiri, Balasore district, Odisha, India
- Died: 1 June 2020 (aged 90); Bhubaneswar
- Citizenship: Indian
- Occupations: Anthropologist, Educator
- Spouse: Hiran Prava Mahapatra
- Children: Sheela Mahapatra (daughter), Sujit Mahapatra (son)

Academic background
- Education: University of Hamburg, University of Calcutta

Lakshman Kumar Mahapatra (29 October 1929 – 1 June 2020) was an Indian anthropologist born in Odisha. He graduated in anthropology from the University of Calcutta and received a doctorate from the University of Hamburg. He was Vice-Chancellor of Utkal University in 1986 and Sambalpur University in 1989. While heading the anthropology department at Utkal University, he was the first academic in India to start a course on Southeast Asia in the regular curriculum at the university level in India.

He became the first person from Odisha to receive the highest award for social sciences from the Indian University Grant Commission. Mahapatra served as a consultant to the World Bank from 1985 to 1988 and again from 1995 to 1996 on rehabilitation of displaced populations of India. He served as the director of the Nabakrushna Choudhury Centre for Development Studies in Bhubaneswar, a social science research study centre set up by the Government of Odisha in collaboration with the Indian Council of Social Science Research (ICSSR) from 2003 to 2006. He has been vice president of the Indian National Confederation and Academy of Anthropology, vice president of the Anthropological Association of India, and founder president of the Association for Friendship and Cultural Corporation With Indonesia. He was awarded the gold medal by the Indian Anthropology Society in 2004 for his lifelong contribution to anthropology. He was honoured by the Indian National Confederation and Academy of Anthropology in 2015.

He died in Bhubaneswar on 1 June 2020 at the age of 90.

== Life ==
=== Childhood ===
Mahapatra was born on 29 October 1929 in Nilagiri, a Notified Area Council in Balasore district in the Indian state of Odisha.

=== Education ===
He studied at the Maharaja Krushna Chandra High School in Baripada.

=== University ===
He went to Ravenshaw College for his intermediate studies and later to the University of Calcutta for his BA and MA in Anthropology. He received a PhD magna cum laude from the University of Hamburg in 1960.

=== Career ===
Mahapatra joined the Utkal University in 1964 where he headed the anthropology department from 1967 to 1989. He started teaching about Southeast Asia as a regular course in collaboration with the Department of Geography and History. This was the first time for a course on Southeast Asia to be taught at an Indian university. He also introduced specialities such as "Development Anthropology" and "Demographic Anthropology" at Utkal University which was also the first for an anthropology department in India.

He was appointed as the vice-chancellor of Utkal University in 1986. He was later the vice-chancellor at Sambalpur University from 1989 to 1990. He served as a Consultant to the World Bank for rehabilitation of displaced populations in India during 1985-1988 and later during 1995–96.

== Bibliography ==
- Folklore of Orissa, National Library of the Netherlands Sudoc [ABES], France Library of Congress/NACO
- Gods, kings and the caste system in India & other essays, Library of Congress/NACO (2013)
- Knowledge for actions: a treatise in anthropology, National Library of France
- People and cultural traditions of Orissa : civilization, society & worldview, NII (Japan)
- Resettlement, impoverishment, and reconstruction in India : development for the deprived, Sudoc [ABES], France Library of Congress/NACO
- Science, culture, and development: Prof. L.K. Mahapatra felicitation volume, NII (Japan) National Library of Israel Library of Congress/NACO
- State, society and religion: cultural historical comparative perspectives of Southeast Asia, Sudoc [ABES], France
- The contours of social welfare, National Library of Israel Library of Congress/NACO (1974)
- Towards rethinking strategy of tribal development, Library of Congress/NACO
- Tribal development in India: myth and reality
- Tribal transformation and cultural integration: India and Odisha
