= Land bonds =

Compensation for compulsory acquisition

Land bonds are financial bonds used in many countries to satisfy, in whole or in part, the compensation payable by the government for compulsory acquisition of any land from private landowners.

Land bonds are normally issued under the provisions of land bonds act of a state government or the central government. The bonds define the terms and conditions for the issuance of the bonds, negotiability of such bonds, principal amount per bond, payment of interest, ability to trade the bonds in open market, tax exemptions granted if any, and redemption of such bonds.

== By country ==
=== Brazil ===
The constitution of Brazil has several articles covering the use of bonds to compensate for land acquisition. Some of these articles are:

- Article 182, which states that a municipal government may, for an area included in its master plan, according to Brazil's federal law, expropriate land. The municipal government may pay for the land in public debt bonds, redeemable within up to ten years, in equal and successive annual installments, ensuring the real value of the compensation and the legal interest.
- Article 184, which states that it is within the power of the state to acquire, on account of social interest, a rural property against prior and fair compensation in agrarian bonds with a clause providing for maintenance of the real value, redeemable within a period of up to twenty years computed as from the second year of issue, and the use of which shall be defined in the law.

=== Guyana ===
Guyana passed a Land Bonds Act in 1959. The act allows the Government of Guyana to acquire land from any person or entity who owns the land or to whom compensation is payable in respect to the purchase or acquisition of the land. The payment for the land may be made in land bonds with the consent of the person or entity, and at the discretion of the government.

The land bonds have the following features:

- They are issued by the state authority responsible for finance.
- The denomination of the land bonds are uniform.
- The bonds are one of three types - fixed date bonds, drawing bonds, annuity bonds.
- The land bonds are usually of a maturity between 5 and 10 years.
- The interest payable on the bond is described by the bond. The interest may be fixed at the time of issuance, or it may be a floating rate that changes with prevailing interest rates or inflation rates.
- The interest is payable every quarter or semi-annually.

=== Ireland ===
Ireland has several statutes relating to land bonds. Ireland's Land Commission may, under its Land Acts, acquire land and pay vendors (landowners) for the acquired land with new land bonds equal in nominal amount to the purchase money and carrying interest as from the date on which the land purchased. The law mandates that new land bonds issued to a vendor for the acquired land, be accepted by such vendor as the equivalent of the corresponding amount of purchase money, and any person having power to sell, may enter into a subsequent purchase agreement notwithstanding that the purchase money under the laws of Ireland is paid in new land bonds instead of cash.

=== Jamaica ===
Jamaica passed its Land Bonds Act in 1955. The act allows the Government of Jamaica to pay with bonds any land acquired from any person or entity who owns the land or to whom compensation is payable.

The land bonds have the following features:

- They are issued by the state authority responsible for finance.
- The bonds are one of two types - Series A or Series B.
- The land bonds may be used, to pay in whole or in part, solely at the discretion of the government.
- The terms of the bond are described by the bond. It includes principal, interest and maturity.

=== South Korea ===
South Korea enacted its Land Reform Act in 1949. Under this Act, the government acquired land from landlords, and compensated them in government bonds worth 1.5 times the annual output on the land.

=== Taiwan ===
In Taiwan, the Equalization of Land Rights Act explains the use of bonds for land acquisition. The Taiwan law provides the following:

- Article 5 of the Act provides that the central government and the competent municipal authorities may issue land bonds to pay for the purchase of private lands at their declared values.
- Article 6 states that the prices of the lands acquired for public purposes, according to their declared values, shall be paid all in cash if below a certain minimum value, after the deduction of any taxes due. However, if the amount to be paid to a landowner is above this minimum value, the portion in excess of that government set minimum value, shall be paid with land bonds for a minimum of 50 percent or in a percentage amount specified by the government.

== See also ==
- Eminent domain
- Confiscation
- Government bond
- Government auction
- Municipal bond
- Bond market
