= Eminent domain =

Legal power of a government to take private property for public use

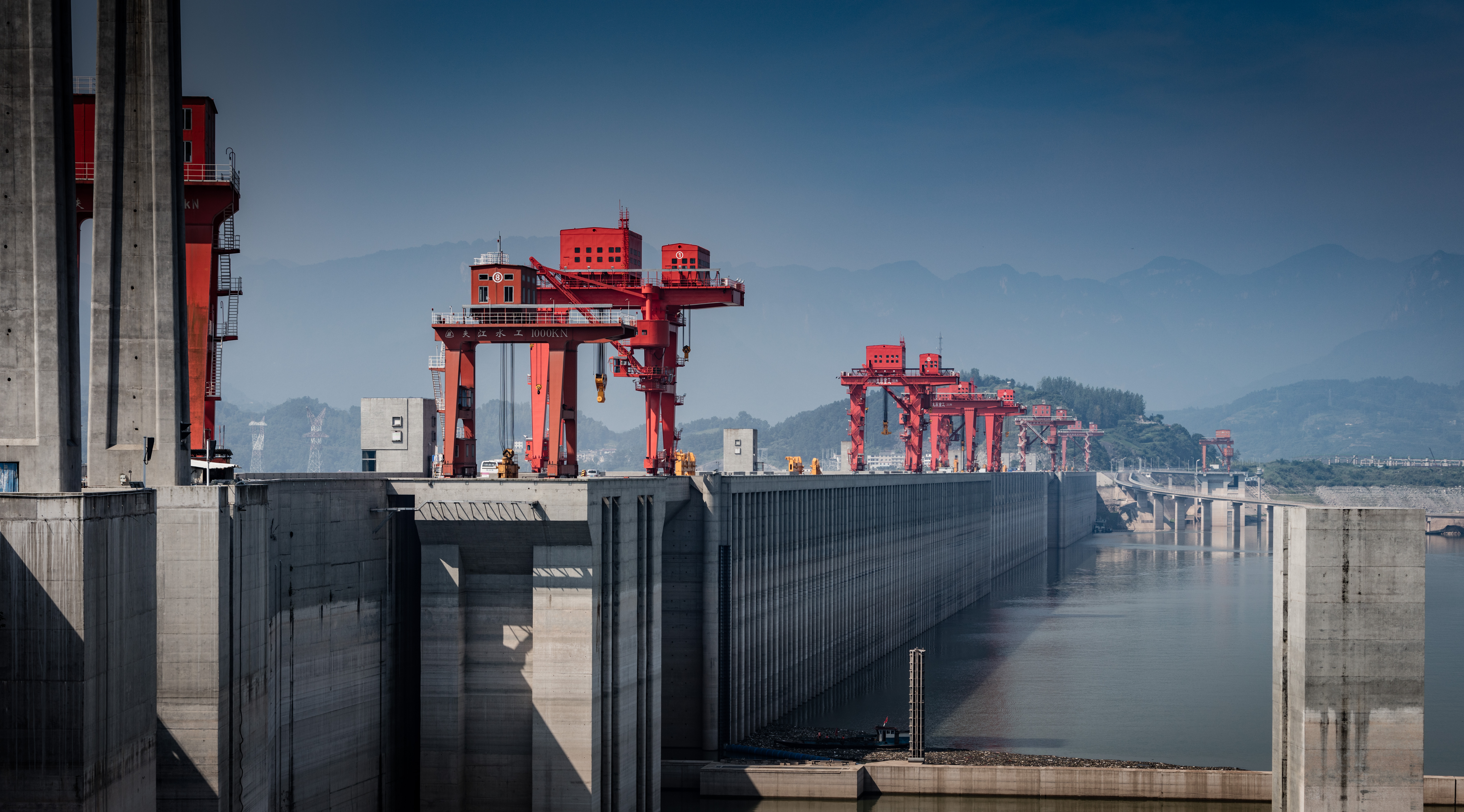
The construction of the Three Gorges Dam in China led to the displacement of over 1.3 million people, highlighting the potential social and environmental costs of large-scale development projects using eminent domain.

Eminent domain, (Note: United States, Philippines, Liberia) also known as land acquisition, (Note: India, Malaysia, Singapore) compulsory purchase, (Note: United Kingdom) resumption, (Note: Hong Kong and Uganda) compulsory acquisition, (Note: Australia, Barbados, New Zealand, Ireland) or expropriation, (Note: Canada, Japan and South Africa) is the compulsory acquisition of private property for public use. It does not include the power to take and transfer ownership of private property from one property owner to another private property owner without a valid public purpose and the payment of just compensation. This power can be legislatively delegated by the state to municipalities, government subdivisions, or even to private persons or corporations, when they are authorized to exercise the functions of a public character.

The most common uses of property taken by eminent domain have been for roads, government buildings and public utilities. Many railroads were given the right of eminent domain to obtain land or easements in order to build and connect rail networks. In the mid-20th century, a new application of eminent domain was pioneered, in which the government could take the property and transfer it to a private third party for redevelopment. This was initially done only on properties that had been deemed "blighted" or a "development impediment", on the principle that such properties had a negative impact upon surrounding property owners, but was later expanded to allow the taking of any private property when the new third-party owner could develop the property in such a way as to bring in increased tax revenues.

Some jurisdictions require that the taker make an offer to purchase the subject property before resorting to the use of eminent domain. However, once the property is taken and the judgment is final, the condemnor owns it in fee simple, and may put it to uses other than those specified in the eminent domain action.

Takings may be of the subject property in its entirety (total take) or in part (partial take), either quantitatively or qualitatively (either partially in fee simple or, commonly, an easement, or any other interest less than the full fee simple title).

== Meaning ==
The term "eminent domain" was taken from the legal treatise De jure belli ac pacis (On the Law of War and Peace), written in 1625 by the Dutch jurist Hugo Grotius, which used the term dominium eminens (Latin for "supreme ownership") and described the power as follows:

The property of subjects is under the eminent domain of the state, so that the state or those who act for it may use and even alienate and destroy such property, not only in the case of extreme necessity, in which even private persons have a right over the property of others, but for ends of public utility, to which ends those who founded civil society must be supposed to have intended that private ends should give way. But, when this is done, the state is bound to make good the loss to those who lose their property.

The exercise of eminent domain is not limited to real property. Condemnors may also take personal property, even intangible property such as contract rights, patents, trade secrets, and copyrights. Even the taking of a professional sports team's franchise has been held by the California Supreme Court to be within the purview of the "public use" constitutional limitation; although eventually, that taking (of the Oakland Raiders' NFL franchise) was not permitted because it was deemed to violate the Interstate Commerce Clause of the U.S. Constitution.

A taking of property must be accompanied by payment of "just compensation" to the [former] owner. In theory, this is supposed to put the owner in the same position pecuniarily that he would have been in had his property not been taken. But in practice U.S. Courts have limited compensation to the property's fair market value, considering its highest and best use. But though rarely granted, this is not the exclusive measure of compensation; see Kimball Laundry Co. v. United States (business losses in temporary takings) and United States v. Pewee Coal Co. (operating losses caused by government operations of a mine seized during World War II). In most takings owners are not compensated for a variety of incidental losses caused by the taking of their property that, though incurred and readily demonstrable in other cases, are deemed by U.S. courts to be noncompensable in eminent domain. The same is true of attorneys' and appraisers' fees. However, as a matter of legislative grace rather than constitutional requirement, some of these losses (e.g., business goodwill) have been made compensable by state legislative enactments, and in the U.S. may be partially covered by provisions of the federal Uniform Relocation Assistance Act.

== Africa ==
=== Zimbabwe ===
In the 1980s, 4,400 white Rhodesians owned 51% of the country's land while 4.3 million black Rhodesians owned 42%, with the remainder being non-agricultural land. Since the 1990s, the Zimbabwean government under Robert Mugabe has compulsorily purchased a great deal of land and homes of mainly white farmers in the course of the land reform movement in Zimbabwe. The government argued that such land reform was necessary to redistribute the land to Zimbabweans dispossessed of their lands during colonialism. Compensation has been delayed, though in 2022 the Zimbabwean government agreed to pay US$3.5 billion in compensation to farmers who lost their land during land reform.

== Asia ==
=== China ===
In China, "requisitions", the Chinese form of eminent domain, are constitutionally permitted as necessary for the public interest, and if compensation is provided. The 2019 Amendment of the Land Administration Law of China spells out detailed guidelines, guaranteeing farmers and those displaced greater financial security.

=== India ===
The Constitution of India originally provided for the Fundamental Right to property under Articles 19 and 31. Article 19 guaranteed to all citizens the right to "acquire, hold and dispose of property". Article 31 provided that "No person shall be deprived of his property save by authority of law." It also provided that compensation would be paid to a person whose property had been "taken possession of or acquired" for public purposes. In addition, both the state government and the Union (federal) government were empowered to enact laws for the "acquisition or requisition of property" (Schedule VII, Entry 42, List III). It is this provision that has been interpreted as being the source of the State's "eminent domain" powers.

The provisions relating to the right to property were changed a number of times. The 44th amendment of 1978 deleted the right to property from the list of Fundamental Rights. A new article, Article 300-A, was added to the Constitution to provide, "No person shall be deprived of his property save by authority of law." Thus, if a legislature makes a law depriving a person of his property, it will not be unconstitutional. The aggrieved person shall have no right to move the court under Article 32. Thus, the right to property is no longer a fundamental right, though it is still a constitutional right. If the government acts in violation of the law, the action can be challenged in a court of law by citizens.

Land acquisition in India is currently governed by the Right to Fair Compensation and Transparency in Land Acquisition, Rehabilitation and Resettlement Act, 2013, which came into force on 1 January 2014. Until 2013, land acquisition in India was governed by Land Acquisition Act of 1894. However, the new LARR (amendment) ordinance of 31 December 2014 diluted many clauses of the original act. The liberalisation of the economy and the Government's initiative to set up special economic zones have led to many protests by farmers and have opened up a debate on the reinstatement of the fundamental right to private property.

== Europe ==
In many European nations, the European Convention on Human Rights provides protection from an appropriation of private property by the state. Article 8 of the Convention provides that "Everyone has the right to respect for his private and family life, his home, and his correspondence" and prohibits interference with this right by the state, unless the interference is in accordance with law and necessary in the interests of national security, public safety, economic well-being of the country, prevention of disorder or crime, protection of health or morals, or protection of the rights and freedoms of others. This right is expanded by Article 1 of the First Protocol to the Convention, which states that "Every natural person or legal person is entitled to the peaceful enjoyment of his possessions." Again, this is subject to exceptions where state deprivation of private possessions is in the general or public interest, is in accordance with law, and, in particular, to secure payment of taxes. Settled case-law of the European Court of Human Rights (ECtHR) provides that just compensation must be paid in cases of expropriation.

=== France ===
In France, the Declaration of the Rights of Man and of the Citizen similarly mandates just and preliminary compensation before expropriation and a déclaration d'utilité publique is commonly required, to demonstrate a public benefit.

Notably, in 1945, by decree of General Charles de Gaulle based on unproven accusations of collaboration with the Nazi occupier, the Renault company was expropriated from Louis Renault posthumously and nationalised as Régie Nationale des Usines Renault, without compensation.

=== Germany ===
The Basic Law for the Federal Republic of Germany states in its Article 14 (3) that "an expropriation is only allowed for the public good" and just compensation must be made. It also provides for the right to have the amount of the compensation checked by a court.

=== Italy ===
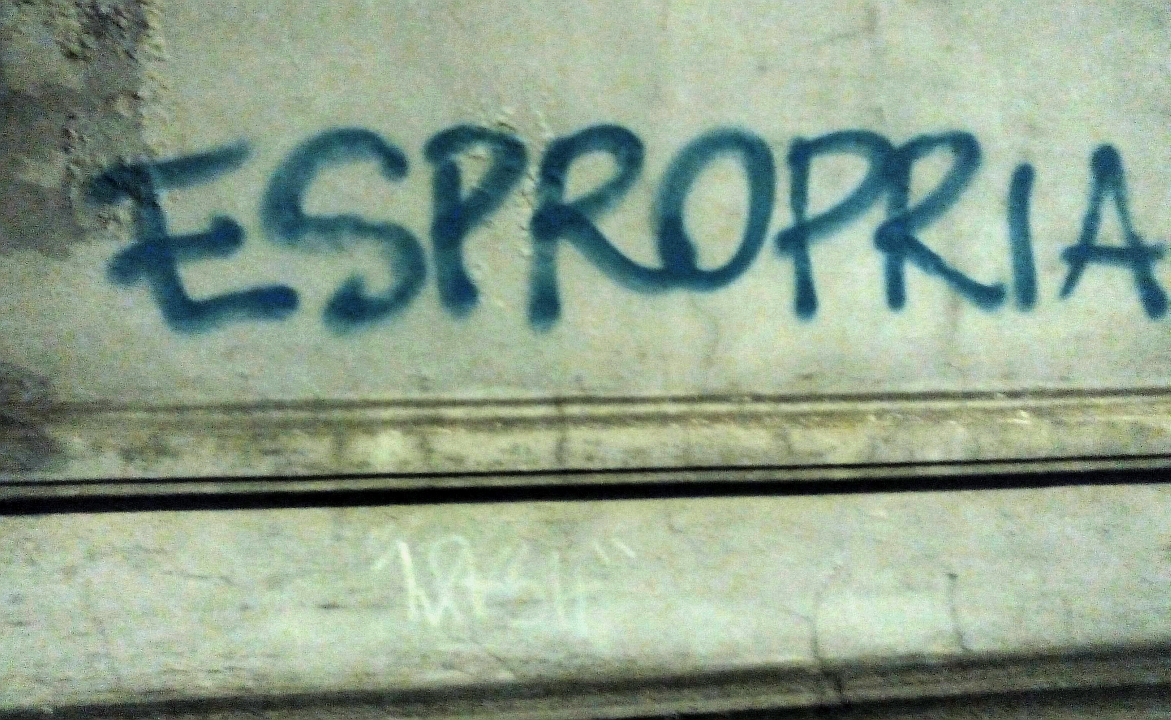
Espropria, "expropriate", protest graffiti in Turin

Esproprio – or more formally espropriazione per pubblica utilità ("expropriation for public utility") – in Italy takes place within the frame of civil law, as an expression of the potere ablatorio (ablative power). The law regulating expropriation is the D.P.R. n.327 of 2001, amended by D.Lgs. n.302 of 2002; it supersedes the old expropriation law, the Royal Decree n.2359 of 1865. Other national and regional laws may apply, not always giving full compensation to the owner. Expropriation can be total (the whole property is expropriated) or partial; permanent or temporary.

Article 42 of the Italian Constitution and article 834 of the Italian Civil Code state that any private goods can be expropriated for public utility. Furthermore, the article 2 of the Constitution binds Italian citizens to respect their "mandatory duties of political, economic and social solidarity".

The implementation of eminent domain follows two principles:

- legality: a public institution can expropriate private goods only in the cases law allows it and respecting its procedures (following article 23 of the Italian Constitution);
- compensation: (art. 42/III) the State must provide a certain amount of money as compensation, which is determined by law. According to the Italian Constitutional Court, this compensation is not required to be equal to the market value of the expropriated good, although this sum must not be merely symbolic.

Nazionalizzazione ("nationalization"), instead, is provided for by article 43 of the Constitution. It transfers to governmental authority and property a whole industrial sector, if it is deemed to be a natural or 'de facto' monopoly, and an essential service of public utility. The most famous nationalization in Italy was the 1962 nationalization of the electrical power sector.

=== Spain ===
Article 33.3 of the Spanish Constitution of 1978 allows forced expropriation (expropiación forzosa) only where justified on the grounds of public utility or social interest and subject to the payment of appropriate compensation as provided for by law.

=== Sweden ===
The right of the state or a municipality to buy property when it is determined to be of "particular public interest" is regulated in Expropriationslagen (1972:719). The government purchases the property at an estimated market value plus a 25% premium. The law also states that the property owner shall not suffer economic harm because of the expropriation.

=== United Kingdom ===
==== England and Wales ====
After his victory in 1066, William the Conqueror seized virtually all land in England. Although he maintained absolute power over the land, he granted fiefs to landholders who served as stewards, paying fees and providing military services. During the Hundred Years' War in the 14th century, Edward III used the Crown's right of purveyance for massive expropriations. Chapter 28 of Magna Carta required that immediate cash payment be made for expropriations. As the king's power was broken down in the ensuing centuries, tenants were regarded as holding ownership rights rather than merely possessory rights over their land. In 1427, a statute was passed granting Commission of sewers in Lincolnshire the power to take land without compensation. After the early 16th century, however, Parliamentary takings of land for roads, bridges, and other infrastructure generally did require compensation. The common practice was to pay 10% more than the assessed value. However, as the voting franchise was expanded to include more non-landowners, the bonus was eliminated. Despite contrary statements found in some American law, in the United Kingdom, compulsory purchase valuation cases were tried by juries well into the 20th century, such as Attorney-General v De Keyser's Royal Hotel Ltd (1919).

In England and Wales, and other jurisdictions that follow the principles of English law, the related term compulsory purchase is used. The landowner is compensated with a price agreed or stipulated by an appropriate person; where agreement on price cannot be achieved, the value of the taken land is determined by the Upper Tribunal. The operative law is a patchwork of statues and case law. The principal acts are the Lands Clauses Consolidation Act 1845 (8 & 9 Vict. c. 18), the Land Compensation Act 1961, the Compulsory Purchase Act 1965, the Land Compensation Act 1973, the Acquisition of Land Act 1981, part IX of the Town and Country Planning Act 1990, the Planning and Compensation Act 1991, and the Planning and Compulsory Purchase Act 2004.

==== Scotland ====
In Scotland, eminent domain is known as compulsory purchase. The development of powers of compulsory purchase originated in the railway mania of the Victorian period. Compensation is available to the landowner, with the Lands Tribunal for Scotland dealing with any disputes arising from the value of compensation. As in England and Wales, the law of compulsory purchase in Scotland is complex. The current statutes regulating compulsory purchase include: the Lands Clauses Consolidation (Scotland) Act 1845 (8 & 9 Vict. c. 19); the Acquisition of Land (Authorisation Procedure) (Scotland) Act 1947; and the Land Compensation (Scotland) Act 1963. The Scottish Law Commission considered the current state of the law of compulsory purchase and advocated reforms in its Discussion Paper on Compulsory Purchase. Such reforms have yet to be made by the Scottish Parliament.

== Oceania ==
=== Australia ===
The term resumption is used in Australia for compulsory acquisition, reflecting the fact that, as a matter of Australian law, all land was originally owned by the Crown before it was sold, leased or granted. Through an act of compulsory acquisition, the Crown is therefore seen to be "resuming" possession. In Australia, section 51 (xxxi) of the Australian Constitution permits the Commonwealth Parliament to make laws with respect to "the acquisition of property on just terms from any State or person for any purpose in respect of which the Parliament has power to make laws". This has been construed as meaning that just compensation may not always include monetary or proprietary recompense, rather it is for the court to determine what is just. It may be necessary to imply a need for compensation in the interests of justice, lest the law be invalidated.

Property subject to resumption is not restricted to real estate, as authority from the Federal Court has extended the States' power to resume property to any form of physical property. For the purposes of section 51 (xxxi), money is not property that may be compulsorily acquired.

The Commonwealth must also derive some benefit from the property acquired, that is, the Commonwealth can "only legislate for the acquisition of Property for particular purposes". Accordingly, the power does not extend to allow legislation designed merely to seek to extinguish the previous owner's title. The states and territories' powers of resumption on the other hand are not so limited. Section 43(1) of the Lands Acquisition Act 1998 (NT) grants the Minister the power to acquire land 'for any purpose whatever'. The High Court of Australia interpreted this provision literally, relieving the Territory government of any public purpose limitation on the power. This finding permitted the Territory government to acquire land subject to Native Title, effectively extinguishing the Native Title interest in the land. Kirby J in dissent, along with a number of commentators, viewed this as a missed opportunity to comment on the exceptional nature of powers of resumption exercised in the absence of a public purpose limitation.

=== New Zealand ===
In New Zealand, the Public Works Act 1981 outlines the powers of the state in relation to land used for public purposes. Under Section 16 of the Public Works Act 1981, the Minister is "empowered to acquire under this Act any land required for a Government work". Local government authorities (such as City or District councils) are also empowered under the same section to acquire land for "local work for which it has financial responsibility".

== North America ==
=== The Bahamas ===
In the Bahamas, the Acquisition of Land Act operates to permit the acquisition of land where it is deemed likely to be required for a public purpose. The land can be acquired by private agreement or compulsory purchase (s7 of the Act). Under section 24 of the Acquisition of Land Act, the purchaser may purchase the interest of the mortgagee of any land acquired under the Act. To do so, the purchaser must pay the principal sum and interest, together with costs and charges plus six months' additional interest.

=== Canada ===
In Canada, expropriation is governed by federal or provincial statutes. Under these statutory regimes, public authorities have the right to acquire private property for public purposes, so long as the acquisition is approved by the appropriate government body. Once a property is taken, an owner is entitled to "be made whole" by compensation for: the market value of the expropriated property, injurious affection to the remainder of the property (if any), disturbance damages, business loss, and special difficulty relocating. Owners can advance claims for compensation above that initially provided by the expropriating authority by bringing a claim before the court or an administrative body appointed by the governing legislation.

=== Panama ===
In Panama, the government must pay a fair amount of money to the owner of the property to be expropriated.

=== United States ===
Most states use the term eminent domain, but some U.S. states use the term appropriation or expropriation (Louisiana) as synonyms for the exercise of eminent domain powers. The term condemnation is used to describe the formal act of exercising the power to transfer title or some lesser interest in the subject property.

The constitutionally required "just compensation" in partial takings is usually measured by fair market value of the part taken, plus severance damages (the diminution in value of the property retained by the owner [remainder] when only a part of the subject property is taken). Where a partial taking provides economic benefits specific to the remainder, those must be deducted, typically from severance damages. Some elements of value, such as a business's connection to the location and the goodwill of the public, are only compensable in a few jurisdictions; where they are not, fair market value may be less than the value of the location to the current user.

The practice of condemnation came to the American colonies with the common law. When it came time to draft the United States Constitution, differing views on eminent domain were voiced. The Fifth Amendment to the Constitution requires that the taking be for a "public use" and mandates payment of "just compensation" to the owner.

In federal law, Congress can take private property directly (without recourse to the courts) by passing an Act transferring title of the subject property directly to the government. In such cases, the property owner seeking compensation must sue the United States for compensation in the U.S. Court of Federal Claims. The legislature may also delegate the power to private entities like public utilities or railroads, and even to individuals. The U.S. Supreme Court has consistently deferred to the right of states to make their own determinations of "public use".

Since the 1950s, the U.S. Supreme Court has issued three major rulings expanding the government's power of eminent domain; they are: Berman v. Parker (1954), Hawaii Housing Authority v. Midkiff (1984), and Kelo v. City of New London (2005).

== South America ==
=== Argentina ===
In Argentina expropriations are governed by federal law 21.499 of January 17, 1977. It has been used in many locations throughout the country's history most recently during the renationalization of YPF. which resulted in the expropriation of 51% of the energy company's shares.

=== Brazil ===
Brazil's expropriation laws are governed by the Presidential Decree No. 3365 of June 21, 1941.

=== Chile ===
Art. 19, No. 24, of the Chilean Constitution says in part, "In no case may anyone be deprived of his property, of the assets affected or any of the essential faculties or powers of ownership, except by virtue of a general or a special law which authorizes expropriation for the public benefit or the national interest, duly qualified by the legislator. The expropriated party may protest the legality of the expropriation action before the ordinary courts of justice and shall, at all times, have the right to indemnification for patrimonial harm actually caused, to be fixed by mutual agreement or by a sentence pronounced by said courts in accordance with the law."

== Religion ==
=== Catholicism ===
Since 1967, the encyclical Populorum progressio, an encyclical on Catholic social teaching by Pope Paul VI, allows the expropriation of land estates for common good needs.

== See also ==
- Angary: during wars
- Confiscation
- Individual reclamation
- Inverse condemnation
- Land bonds
- Law of the land (Jewish)
- Legal plunder
- Navigable servitude: waterways regulation
- Water law
- Manifest destiny
- Compulsory purchase order
- Georgism
