= Forest Rights Act (India) =

2006 legislation in India

Scheduled Tribes and Other Traditional Forest Dwellers (Recognition of Forest Rights) Act, 2006

Parliament of India
- Long title: An Act to recognise and vest the forest rights and occupation in forest land in forest dwelling Scheduled Tribes and other traditional forest dwellers who have been residing in such forests for generations but whose rights could not be recorded; to provide for a framework for recording the forest rights so vested and the nature of evidence required for such recognition and vesting in respect of forest land.
- Citation: Act No. 2 of 2007
- Enacted by: Parliament of India
- Enacted: 29 December 2006
- Assented to: 29 December 2006
- Commenced: 31 December 2007
- Status: In force

The Scheduled Tribes and Other Traditional Forest Dwellers (Recognition of Forest Rights) Act, 2006 is a key piece of forest legislation passed in India on 18 December 2006. It has also been called the Forest Rights Act, the Tribal Rights Act, the Tribal Bill, and the Tribal Land Act. The law concerns the rights of forest-dwelling communities to land and other resources, denied to them over decades as a result of the continuance of colonial forest laws in India.

Before this Act, forest-dependent communities, especially Scheduled Tribes (STs) and Other Traditional Forest Dwellers (OTFDs), did not have official recognition of their rights to access or manage forest land and resources. After independence, forest conservation policies largely overlooked their presence, often considering them as encroachers.

Supporters of the Act claim that it will redress the "historical injustice" committed against forest dwellers, while including provisions for making conservation more effective and more transparent. The demand for the law has seen massive national demonstrations involving hundreds of thousands of people.

However, the law has also been the subject of considerable controversy in India. Opponents of the law claim it will lead to massive forest destruction and should be repealed.

A little over one year after it was passed, the Act was notified into force on 31 December 2007. On 1 January 2008, this was followed by the notification of the Rules framed by the Ministry of Tribal Affairs to supplement the procedural aspects of the Act.

== Background ==
India's forests are home to hundreds of millions of people, including many Scheduled Tribes, who live in or near the forest areas of the country. Nearly 250 million people live in and around forests in India, of which the estimated indigenous Adivasi or tribal population stands at about 100 million. To put these numbers in perspective, if considered a nation by themselves, they would form the 13th largest country in the world, even though they do not represent any singular, monolithic culture. Forests provide sustenance in the form of minor forest produce, water, grazing grounds and habitat for shifting cultivation. Moreover, vast areas of land that may or may not be forests are classified as "forest" under India's forest laws, and those cultivating these lands are technically cultivating "forest land". Forest Rights Act is also known as Community Forest Management (CFM) in Telangana.

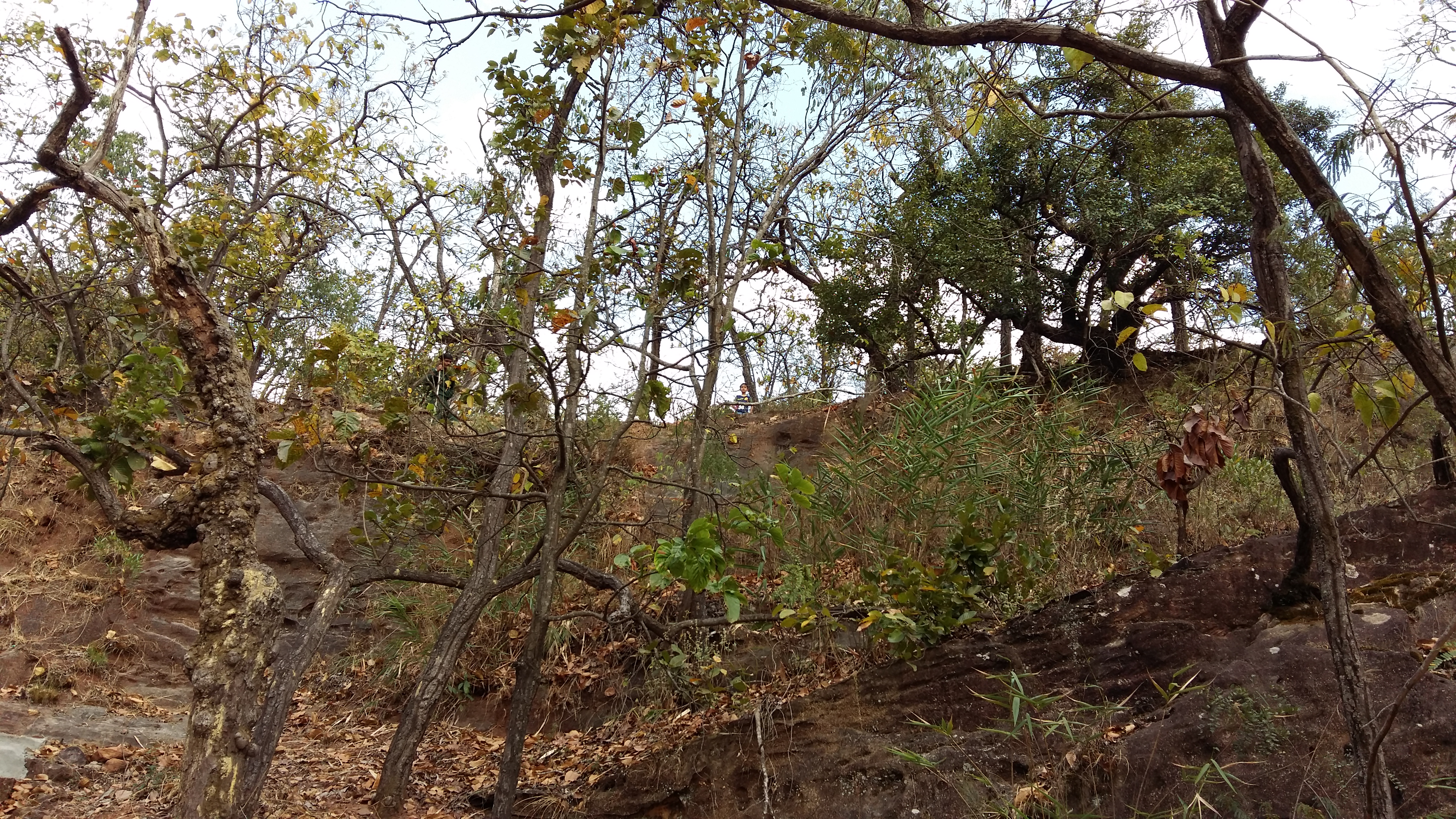
A forest in India

Since time immemorial, the tribal communities of India have had an integral and close relationship with the forests and have been dependent on the forests for livelihoods and existence. The relationship was mutually beneficial. However, rights were rarely recognized by the authorities and in the absence of real ownership of the land, the already marginalized local dwellers suffered.

The reason for this latter phenomenon is India's forest laws. India's forests are governed by two main laws, the Indian Forest Act, 1927 and the Wild life (Protection) Act, 1972. The former empowers the government to declare any area to be a reserved forest, protected forest or village forest. The latter allows any area to be constituted as a "protected area", namely a national park, wildlife sanctuary, tiger reserve or community conservation area.

Under these laws, the rights of people living in or depending on the area to be declared as a forest or protected area are to be "settled" by a "forest settlement officer." This basically requires that officer to enquire into the claims of people to the land, minor forest produce, etc., and, in the case of claims found to be valid, to allow them to continue or to extinguish them by paying compensation.

Studies have shown that in many areas this process either did not take place at all or took place in a highly faulty manner. Thus, 82.9% of the forest blocks in undivided Madhya Pradesh had not been settled as of December 2003, while all the hilly tracts of Odisha were declared government forests without any survey. In Odisha, around 40% of the government forests are "deemed reserved forests" which have not been surveyed.

Those whose rights are not recorded during the settlement process are susceptible to eviction at any time. This "legal twilight zone" leads to harassment, evictions, extortion of money and sexual molestation of forest dwellers by forest officials, who wield absolute authority over forest dwellers' livelihoods and daily lives.

The Statement of Objects and Reasons of the Forest Rights Act describes it as a law intended to correct the "historical injustice" done to forest dwellers by the failure to recognise their rights.

"The Scheduled Tribes and Other Traditional Forest Dwellers (Recognition of Forest Rights) Act, 2006" was enacted by the Parliament of India in December 2006. On 28 June 2022, the Ministry of Environment, Forest and Climate Change (MoEFCC) introduced an amendment that enabled state governments to de-reserve or divert forest lands.

== Provisions ==
The Act as passed in 2006 has the following basic points-

=== Types of rights ===
The rights which are included in section 3(1) of the Act are:

1. Right to hold and live in the forest land under the individual or common occupation for habitation or for self-cultivation for livelihood by a member or members of a forest dwelling Scheduled Tribe or other traditional forest dwellers;
2. Community rights such as nistar, by whatever name called, including those used in erstwhile Princely states, Zamindari or such intermediary regimes;
3. Right of ownership, access to collect, use, and dispose of minor forest produce( includes all non-timber forest produce of plant origin) which has been traditionally collected within or outside village boundaries;
4. Other community rights of uses of entitlements such as fish and other products of water bodies, grazing (both settled or transhumant) and traditional seasonal resource access of nomadic or pastoralist communities;
5. Rights including community tenures of habitat and habitation for primitive tribal groups and pre-agriculture communities;
6. Rights in or over disputed lands under any nomenclature in any State where claims are disputed;
7. Rights for conversion of Pattas or leases or grants issued by any local council or any State Govt. on forest lands to titles;
8. Rights of settlement and conversion of all forest villages, old habitation, unsurveyed villages, and other villages in the forest, whether recorded, notified or not into revenue villages;
9. Right to protect, regenerate or conserve or manage any community forest resource which they have been traditionally protecting and conserving for sustainable use;
10. Rights which are recognized under any State law or laws of any Autonomous Dist. Council or Autonomous Regional Council or which are accepted as rights of tribals under any traditional or customary law of the concerned tribes of any State;
11. Right of access to biodiversity and community right to intellectual property and traditional knowledge related to biodiversity and cultural diversity;
12. Any other traditional right customarily enjoyed by the forest dwelling Scheduled Tribes or other traditional forest dwellers, as the case may be, which are not mentioned in clauses-1 to 11, but excluding the traditional right of hunting or trapping extracting a part of the body of any species of wild animal.

These can be summarised as:

- Title rights – i.e. ownership – to land that is being farmed by tribals or forest dwellers as on 13 December 2005, subject to a maximum of 4 hectares; ownership is only for land that is actually being cultivated by the concerned family as on that date, meaning that no new lands are granted
- Use rights – to minor forest produce (also including ownership), to grazing areas, to pastoralist routes, etc.
- Relief and development rights – to rehabilitation in case of illegal eviction or forced displacement; and to basic amenities, subject to restrictions for forest protection
- Forest management rights – to protect forests and wildlife

=== Eligibility criteria ===
According to Section 2(c) of the Forest Rights Act (FRA), to qualify as Forest Dwelling Scheduled Tribe (FDST) and be eligible for recognition of rights under FRA, three conditions must be satisfied by the applicant/s, who could be "members or community":

1. Must be a Scheduled Tribe in the area where the right is claimed; and

2. Primarily resided in forest or forests land prior to 13-12-2005; and

3. Depend on the forest or forests land for bonafide livelihood needs.

According to Section 2(o) of Forest Rights Act (FRA), to qualify as Other Traditional Forest Dweller (OTFD) and be eligible for recognition of rights under FRA, two conditions need to be fulfilled:

1. Primarily resided in forest or forests land for three generations (75 years) prior to 13-12-2005, and

2. Depend on the forest or forest land for bonafide livelihood needs.

Section 2(o) refers to "any member or community" for this purpose, and hence if an OTFD village establishes its eligibility under the Act, there is no need for every individual to do so separately.

=== Process of recognition of rights ===
Section 6(1) of the Act provides that the gram sabha, or village assembly, will initially pass a resolution recommending whose rights to which resources should be recognized (i.e. which lands belong to whom, how much land was under the cultivation of each person as on 13 Dec 2005, etc.). This resolution is then screened and approved at the level of the sub-division (or taluka) and subsequently at the district level. The screening committees consist of three government officials (Forest, Revenue, and Tribal Welfare departments) and three elected members of the local body at that level. These committees also hear appeals.

=== Resettlement for wildlife conservation ===
Section 4(2) of the Act lays out a procedure by which people can be resettled from areas if it is found to be necessary for wildlife conservation. The first step is to show that relocation is scientifically necessary and no other alternative is available; this has to be done through a process of public consultation. The second step is that the local community must consent to the resettlement. Finally, the resettlement must provide not only compensation but a secure livelihood.

New 2022 Forest Conservation Amendment

In the new 2022 Forest Conservation Rules, the Ministry of Environment, Forest and Climate Change (MoEFCC) introduced an amendment to the Forest Conservation Act of 1980 which violates the Forest Rights Act of 2006. This amendment transferred the rights of forests from tribal communities to large corporations such as private mining and pharmaceutical companies. The amendment allows district collectors to override the approval of Gram Sabhas and transfer the forest land to private entities. In doing so, the amendment revokes the participatory rights of the forest dwellers by making them bystanders to actions that directly impact their livelihood. Instead, it provides corporations with unlimited rights to develop the land for exploitative uses such as underground mining.

The Union Government's rationale for enacting the new 2022 Rules was to simplify the forest clearance process by streamlining the process and eliminating elements that were thought to hinder the approval of land transfers under the Forest Act.

The new 2022 Rules are seen as emblematic of the Modi administration's pro-business focus at the expense of environmental protection and the rights of indigenous communities. Such an approach has raised serious concerns about the potential exploitation of forest resources and the harm inflicted upon forest-dependent communities. Many have called for the government to repeal the amendment and ensure that the Forest Rights Act is implemented in a way that protects the rights of forest-dwelling communities and the environment.

== Misunderstanding the Act as a land distribution scheme ==
A great deal of the debate is fuelled by misunderstandings of the purpose of the Act. The most common is that the purpose of the law is to distribute forest land to forest dwellers or tribals, often claimed to be at the rate of 4 hectares per family. The Act is intended to recognise lands that are already under cultivation as on 13 December 2005, not to grant title to any new lands.

== Opposition ==
The Act has been met with much concern and opposition from environmentalists and wildlife conservationists. Some of this opposition has been motivated by those who see the law as a land distribution scheme that will lead to the handing over of forests to tribals and forest dwellers. But the strongest opposition to the Act has come from wildlife conservationists who fear that the law will make it impossible to create "inviolate spaces", or areas free of human presence, for the purposes of wildlife conservation. Tiger conservation in particular has been an object of concern.

Interpretation regarding Deadline cut-off-date: M.Sai Sampath, Founder-President ECO FAWN Society had actively engaged in environment and wildlife conservation who also appeared before Hon'ble Parliamentary Committee suggested for incorporation of "Deadline cut-off-date" to complete whole process of identification, verification and recognition of Forest Rights to genuine tribals and other traditional forest dwellers in the country. Also importantly Sampath had correlated decline/encroachment of forest land with the implementation of FRA 2006 in the country where the Hon'ble Parliamentary Committee has agreed the submission made and pointed an extent of 16.21 Lakh Ha of forest land encroached after implementation of the Forest Rights Act 2006, subsequently various measures were suggested by the Parliamentary Committee. (9th and 18th Report of the Parliamentary Committee on Petitions, 16th Lok Sabha).

Supporters of the Act take the position that the Act is not a land distribution measure, and further that the Act is more transparent than existing law and so can help stop land grabbing. Regarding wildlife conservation, they have argued that the Act actually provides a clear and explicit procedure for resettling people where necessary for wildlife protection, but also provides safeguards to prevent this being done arbitrarily.

Indeed, while concerned at some of the provisions, some environmentalists have also argued that "Conservationists who have stated that the Forest Bill will be the death-knell of India's forests are indulging in unsubstantiated exaggeration".

Supporters of the Act and others also argue that the provisions in the Act for community conservation will in fact strengthen forest protection in the country. This is said to be because it will provide a legal right for communities themselves to protect the forest, as thousands of villages are already doing in the face of official opposition.

=== Television advertisements ===
In October 2003, Vanashakti, a group based in Mumbai, ran television advertisements against the Act. This is the first time any Indian legislation has been attacked through a television campaign.

Six advertisements were run by the organisation across major Indian news and television channels, ads which continue to be available on their website. The group criticised the Forest Rights Act as having the potential to cause huge floods, droughts, and to increase global warming. They also decried it as an effort to keep "tribals in the forest" instead of assisting their "development."

In response to questions from a newspaper, Vanashakti claimed to have been formed over "a dinner table conversation" as a result of deep concern about the Forest Rights Act and the lack of media attention to it.

The television ad campaign was met with angry responses from forest rights organisations. The Campaign for Survival and Dignity, a federation of tribal and forest dwellers' organisations from several States of India, wrote an Open Letter to Vanashakti, criticising them for "attacking the Forest Rights Act through distortions and untruths that do nothing to reinforce forest protection, and a great deal to undermine it." The Campaign also put up a website entitled "Vanashakti's Distortions and Untruths". An exchange of correspondence followed, which can be found both at the Vanashakti website and at the website on the Scheduled Tribes and Other Traditional Forest Dwellers (Recognition of Forest Rights) Act" put up by the Campaign .

== Criticism by forest rights supporters ==
While supporting the principles of the law, forest rights supporters are not entirely satisfied with the law as finally passed. The recommendations of a Joint Parliamentary Committee on the law were partly rejected, and supporters of forest rights have claimed that some of the rejected clauses were important. In particular, the final form of the law is said to make it easier to exclude some categories of both tribal and non-tribal forest dwellers, to have undermined the democratic nature of the processes in the Act and to have placed additional hindrances and bureaucratic restrictions on people's rights. The Campaign for Survival and Dignity described the final form of the law as "both a victory and a betrayal" in their official statement on the occasion.

== Notification ==
The one-year delay in the notification of the Act and the Rules was the subject of considerable Parliamentary and political uproar in the winter session of the Indian Parliament in 2007. There was also mass protests across India demanding that the Act be notified in October 2007, and in November 2007 a week-long sit down protest took place in Delhi with the same demand.

On 31 December, the Act was notified into force, and on 1 January the Rules for the Act – which provide the procedures for implementing its provisions – were also notified. The Campaign for Survival and Dignity welcomed the notification but sharply criticised a number of provisions in the Rules, claiming that they undermined democracy and the spirit of the Act.

== Implementation ==
There have been numerous complaints regarding the manner in which the Act has been implemented after its notification. For instance, in September 2010, the Council for Social Development, a New Delhi-based think tank, released a "Summary Report on Implementation of the Forest Rights Act" which stated that:

All of the key features of this legislation have been undermined by a combination of apathy and sabotage during the process of implementation. In the current situation the rights of the majority of tribals and other traditional forest dwellers are being denied and the purpose of the legislation is being defeated. Unless immediate remedial measures are taken, instead of undoing the historical injustice to tribal and other traditional forest dwellers, the Act will have the opposite outcome of making them even more vulnerable to eviction and denial of their customary access to forests... both the Central and the State governments have actively pursued policies that are in direct violation of the spirit and letter of the Act."

The Ministry of Tribal Affairs releases monthly reports on the status of implementation of the Act. These can be obtained from the Ministry's website.

== Judgements ==
Recently, Sc in Wildlife first vs Moefcc has ordered eviction of encroachers on forest land, in which majority of tribal and forest dwellers were also ordered to be evicted. This order invited challenges from various quarters as in many cases request was cancelled on non availability of documents by district level committee under the act. Therefore, court agreed to review its judgement and give time of 4 months to state governments to complete the process again.
