= Second Banerjee ministry =

2016–2021 government of West Bengal, India

- 20th Ministry of West Bengal

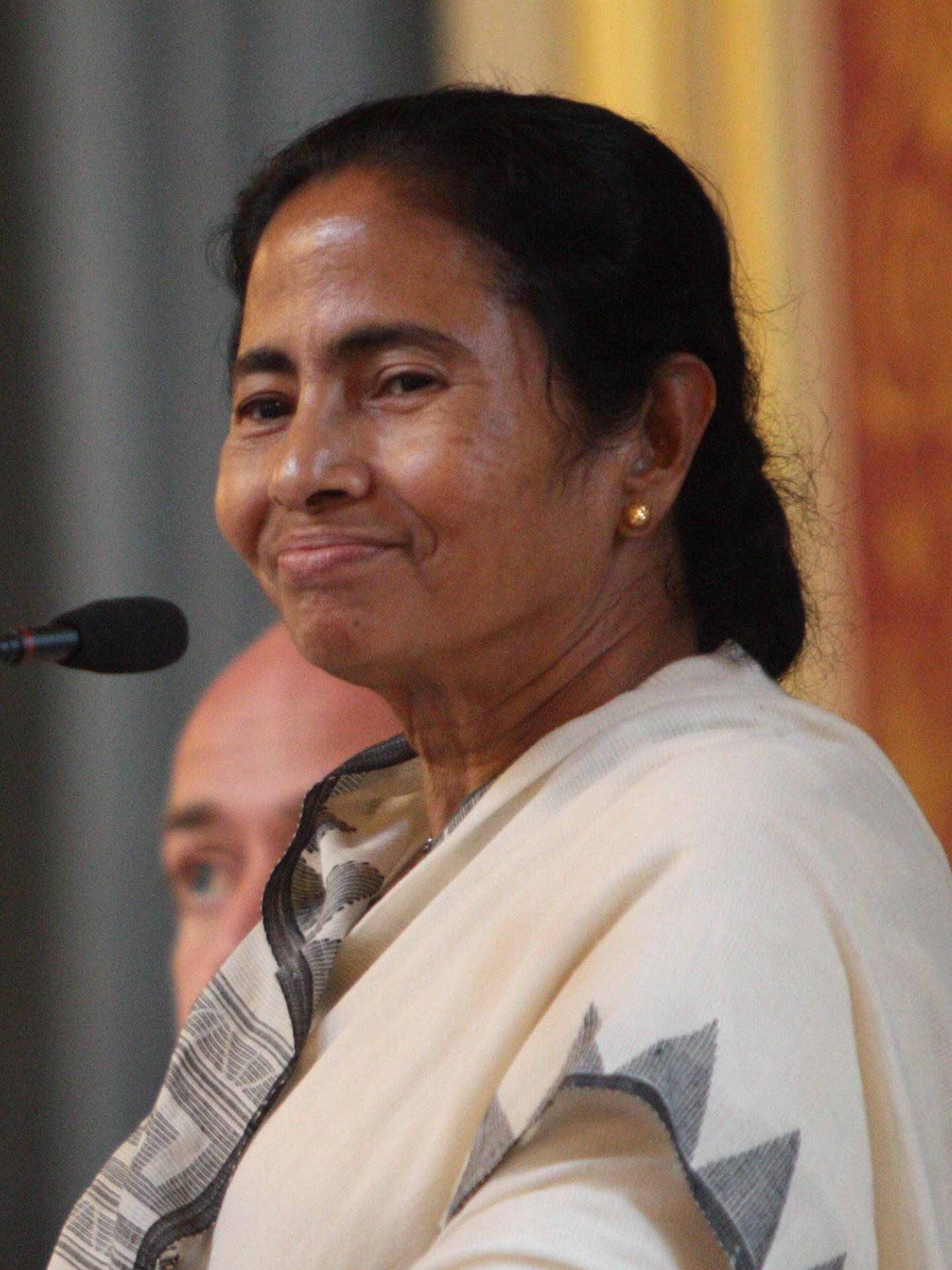
- Mamata Banerjee, Chief Minister of West Bengal
- Date established: 26 May 2016
- Date dissolved: 4 May 2021

Leadership and composition
- Head of state: Keshari Nath Tripathi; Jagdeep Dhankhar (as Governor of West Bengal)
- Head of government: Mamata Banerjee
- No. of ministers: 39
- Member parties: AITC
- Status in legislature: Majority
- Opposition party: INC
- Opposition leader: Abdul Mannan

Formation and history
- Election: 2016
- Legislature term: 5 years
- Predecessor: First Mamata Banerjee ministry
- Successor: Third Mamata Banerjee ministry

Mamata Banerjee was sworn in as Chief Minister of West Bengal on 27 May 2016. Here is the list of ministers.

== Council of Ministers ==
Sl No.	Name	Constituency	Ministry in Charge	Party
1	Mamata Banerjee, Chief Minister	Bhabanipur	Ministry of Home Affairs, Ministry of Health & Family Welfare, Ministry of Land & Land Reforms, Ministry of Information & Cultural Affairs, Hill Affairs, Micro and Small Scale Enterprises, Ministry of Personnel & Administrative Reforms, Ministry of Transport, Ministry of Minority Affairs & Madrassah Education	AITC
2	Amit Mitra	Khardaha	Minister of Finance; Minister of Excise, Commerce & Industries, Industrial Reconstruction, Public Enterprise	AITC
3	Partha Chatterjee	Behala Paschim	Ministry of Parliamentary Affairs; Minister for Education, Minister of Science & Technology and Biotechnology	AITC
4	Subrata Mukherjee	Ballygunge	Minister of Panchayat & Rural Development, Public Health Engineering	AITC
5	Sovandeb Chattopadhyay	Rashbehari	Minister of Power & Non-Conventional Energy Sources	AITC
6	Goutam Deb	Dabgram-Phulbari	Ministry of Tourism	AITC
7	Abani Mohan Joardar	Krishnanagar Uttar	Minister of Correctional Administration, Minister of Refugee Relief & Rehabilitation	AITC
8	Bratya Basu	Dum Dum	Minister of Information Technology & Electronics	AITC
9	Abdur Razzak Molla	Bhangar	Minister of Food Procurement and Horticulture	AITC
10	Jyotipriyo Mullick	Habra	Minister of Food & Supplies	AITC
11	Firhad Hakim	Kolkata Port	Minister of Urban Development and Municipal Affairs	AITC
12	Aroop Biswas	Tollygung	Minister of Public Works Department, Minister of Youth Affairs, Sports	AITC
13	Javed Khan	Kasba	Minister of Disaster Management	AITC
14	Moloy Ghatak	Asansol North	Ministry of Labour, Minister of Law & Judicial Services	AITC
15	Purnendo Bose	Rajarhat Gopalpur	Ministry of Agriculture	AITC
16	Arup Roy	Howrah Central	Minister of Co-operation	AITC
17	Rajib Banerjee	Domjur	Minister of Irrigation and Waterways	AITC
18	Chandranath Sinha	Bolpur	Ministry of Fisheries	AITC
19	Tapan Dasgupta	Saptagram	Minister of Agriculture Marketing	AITC
20	Somen Mahapatra	Pingla	Ministry of Water Resources	AITC
21	James Kujur	Kumargram	Minister of Tribal Development	AITC
22	Binay Krishna Barman	Mathabhanga	Minister of Forest	AITC
23	Rabindra Nath Ghosh	Natabari	Minister of North Bengal Development	AITC
24	Sadhan Pande	Maniktala	Ministry of Consumer Affairs, Food and Public Distribution; Minister of Self Help Groups	AITC
25	Santiram Mahato	Balarampur	Minister of Paschimanchal Unnayan	AITC
27	Churamani Mahato	Kumargram	Minister of Backward Classes Welfare	AITC
28	Asish Banerjee	Rampurhat	Minister of Biotechnology, Ministry of Statistics & Programme Implementation	AITC

=== Minister of State (Independent charge) ===
Sl No.	Name	Constituency	Ministry in Charge	Party
1	Shashi Panja (Note: Also in the charge of Minister of State.)	Shyampukur	Minister of Women Development & Social Welfare, Child Development, MoS–Health and Family Welfare	AITC
2	Siddiqullah Chowdhury (Note: Also in the charge of Minister of State.)	Mangalkote	Minister of Mass Education, Library, MoS-Parliamentary Affairs	AITC
3	Ashima Patra	Dhanikhali	Minister of Technical Education	AITC
4	Manturam Pakhira	Kakdwip	Minister of Sunderbans Development	AITC
5	Swapan Debnath	Purbasthali South	Minister of MSME, Minister of Land & Land Reforms	AITC

=== Minister of State ===
Sl No.	Name	Constituency	Ministry in Charge	Party
1	Bachhu Hansda	Tapan	Minister of State for North Bengal Development	AITC
2	Ghulam Rabbani	Goalpokhar	Minister of State for Tourism	AITC
3	Zakir Hossain	Jangipur	Minister of State for Labour	AITC
4	Vacant	Howrah North	Ministry of Youth Affairs and Sports	-
5	Indranil Sen	Chandannagar	Ministry of Information & Cultural Affairs	AITC
6	Shyamal Santra	Kotulpur	Minister of State for Panchayat & Rural Development, Ministry of PHE	AITC
7	Sandharani Tudu	Manbazar	Minister of Backward Classes Welfare	AITC
8	Giasuddin Mollah	Magrahat Paschim	Minister of Minority Affairs and Madrasah Education	AITC
