= Ashima Patra =

Indian politician

Deputy Leader of the Opposition in West Bengal
- In office 9 May 2026 – 2 June 2026 Serving with Nayna Bandyopadhyay
- Preceded by: Manas Bhunia
- Succeeded by: Sandipan Saha; Javed Ahmed Khan; Sabina Yeasmin; Seuli Saha

Member of the West Bengal Legislative Assembly
- Incumbent
- Assumed office 13 May 2011
- Preceded by: Ajit Patra
- Constituency: Dhanekhali

Minister of State (Independent Charge) Government of West Bengal
- In office 2016–2021
- Governor: Keshari Nath Tripathi; Jagdeep Dhankhar
- Chief Minister: Mamata Banerjee

Personal details
- Born: January 7, 1968 (age 58) India
- Party: Trinamool Congress (until 2026); Mamata All India Trinamool Congress (from 2026)
- Occupation: Politician

Ashima Patra (born 7 January, 1968) is an Indian politician from West Bengal. She served as Minister of State (Independent Charge) for Technical Education in the Government of West Bengal from 2016 to 2021 and since 2016 is Member of West Bengal Legislative Assembly for Dhaniakhali.

== Career ==
=== MLA ===
She was elected as the Member of the Legislative Assembly from Dhanekhali (Vidhan Sabha constituency) since year 2016.

=== Minister in West Bengal ===
She served as the Minister of State of the Department of Technical Education, Training and Skill Development (Independent charge) of West Bengal Government in Mamata Banerjee ministry (2016–2021) in the years between 2016 – 2017.

Between 2017 and 2018, she also served as the Minister of State of the Department of Planning, Statistics and Programme Monitoring (Independent charge) Welfare of West Bengal Government in Mamata Banerjee ministry.

Since 2017, she has been the Minister of State of the Department of Backward Classes of West Bengal Government in Mamata Banerjee ministry (2016–2021).

Since 2016, she has been the Minister of State of the Department of Fisheries of West Bengal Government in Mamata Banerjee ministry (2016–2021).

== Portfolios ==
Political offices
Preceded by Purnendo Bose	Minister of State of the Department Technical Education, Training and Skill Development department (Independent charge) West Bengal Government in Mamata Banerjee ministry (2016–2021); 2016 – 2017	Succeeded by Purnendo Bose
Preceded by Churamani Mahato	Minister of State of the Department of Backward Classes Welfare West Bengal Government in Mamata Banerjee ministry (2016–2021); 2017 – 2021	Succeeded by Bulu Chik Baraik
Preceded by Rachhpal Singh	Minister of State of the Department of Planning, Statistics and Programme Monitoring (Independent charge) of West Bengal Government in Mamata Banerjee ministry (2016–2021); 2017 – 2018	Succeeded by Tapas Roy
Preceded by Vacant	Minister of State for Fisheries Government of West Bengal; 2016 - 2021	Succeeded by Akhil Giri
State Legislative Assembly
Preceded by Ajit Patra	Member of the West Bengal Legislative Assembly from Dhanekhali Assembly constituency 2011 –	Incumbent
