= Asansol Uttar Assembly constituency =

West Bengal Legislative Assembly constituency

Asansol Uttar
- Constituency No. 281 for the West Bengal Legislative Assembly
- Interactive Map Outlining Asansol Uttar Assembly Constituency

Constituency details
- Country: India
- Region: East India
- State: West Bengal
- District: Paschim Bardhaman
- Lok Sabha constituency: Asansol
- Established: 1951
- Total electors: 2,36,858 (2026)
- Reservation: None

Member of Legislative Assembly
- 18th West Bengal Legislative Assembly
- Incumbent Krishnendu Mukherjee
- Party: BJP
- Alliance: NDA
- Elected year: 2026

Asansol Uttar Assembly constituency is an assembly constituency in Paschim Bardhaman district in the Indian state of West Bengal.

== Overview ==
As per orders of the Delimitation Commission, No. 281 Asansol Uttar Assembly constituency covers Ward Nos. 13-15, 20-31, 40-55, 76 of Asansol Municipal Corporation.

Asansol Uttar assembly segment is part of No. 40 Asansol (Lok Sabha constituency).

== Members of the Legislative Assembly ==
Year	Name	Party
Asansol
1951	Atindra Nath Bose	Forward Bloc
1957	Shibdas Ghatak	Indian National Congress
1962	Bijoy Pal	Communist Party of India
1967	Dr. Gopika Ranjan Mitra	Indian National Congress
1969	Lokesh Ghosh	Communist Party of India
1971	Lokesh Ghosh	Communist Party of India
1972	Niranjan Dihidar	Communist Party of India
1977	Haradhan Roy	Communist Party of India
1982	Bijoy Pal	Communist Party of India
1987	Prabuddha Laha	Indian National Congress
1991	Goutam Roy Choudhury	Communist Party of India
1996	Tapas Banerjee	Indian National Congress
2001	Kalyan Banerjee	All India Trinamool Congress
2006	Prativa Ranjan Mukherjee	Communist Party of India
Asansol Uttar
2011	Moloy Ghatak	All India Trinamool Congress
2016	Moloy Ghatak	All India Trinamool Congress
2021	Moloy Ghatak	All India Trinamool Congress
2026	Krishnendu Mukherjee	Bharatiya Janata Party

== Election results ==
=== 2026 ===
2026 West Bengal Legislative Assembly election: Asansol Uttar
Party	Candidate	Votes	%	±%
BJP	Krishnendu Mukherjee	104,516	49.63	+8.25
AITC	Moloy Ghatak	92,901	44.11	−8.21
CPI	Akhilesh Kumar Singh	4,779	2.27	
INC	Prasenjit Puitandy	1,980	0.94	
NOTA	None of the above	2,755	1.31	−0.43
Majority		11,615	5.52	−5.42
Turnout		210,607	88.83	+18.88
BJP gain from AITC		Swing		

=== 2021 ===
2021 West Bengal Legislative Assembly election: Asansol Uttar
Party	Candidate	Votes	%	±%
AITC	Ghatak Moloy	100,931	52.32	
BJP	Krishnendu Mukherjee	79,821	41.38	
ISF	Mohammad Mustaquim	4,471	2.32	
NOTA	None of the above	3,348	1.74	
Majority		21,110	10.94	
Turnout		192,907	69.95	
AITC hold		Swing		

=== 2016 ===
2016 West Bengal Legislative Assembly election: Asansol Uttar
Party	Candidate	Votes	%	±%
AITC	Moloy Ghatak	84,715	46.12	−16.02
BJP	Nirmal Karmakar	60,818	33.11	+28.74
INC	Indrani Mishra	31,892	17.36	−13.85#
BMP	Dipali Ruidas	2,178	1.18	N/A
ABHM	Shyama Charan Dutta	1,268	0.69	N/A
NOTA	None of the above	2,795	1.52	N/A
Majority		23,897	13.01	−17.92
Turnout		1,83,844	73.68	
AITC hold		Swing	-22.38	

1. #Joint candidate of CPI(M), CPI, JD(U), RJD, NCP and INC. As the CPI(M) contested the previous election, the performance of this candidate is based on the previous election

=== 2011 ===
2011 West Bengal Legislative Assembly election: Asansol Uttar
Party	Candidate	Votes	%	±%
AITC	Moloy Ghatak	96,011	62.14	+11.26#
CPI(M)	Ranu Roychowdhury	48,218	31.21	−17.91
BJP	Madan Mohan Choubey	6,750	4.37	
JD(U)	Bijay Prasad Singh	3,536	2.29	
Majority		47,793	30.93	
Turnout		1,54,631	76.86	
AITC gain from CPI(M)		Swing	+29.17	

.# Swing calculated on Congress+Trinamool Congress vote percentages in 2006 taken together.

=== 2006 ===
In the 2006 state assembly elections, Prativa Ranjan Mukherjee of the Communist Party of India (Marxist) (CPI (M)) won the Asansol seat, defeating his nearest rival Kalyan Banerjee of the Trinamool Congress. Contests in most years were multi cornered but only winners and runners-up are being mentioned. In 2001, Kalyan Banerjee had defeated Goutam Roy Choudhuri of CPI (M). In 1996, Tapas Banerjee of Congress had defeated Goutam Roy Choudhury. In 1991, Goutam Roy Choudhury had won the seat defeating Bajrangi Gupta of the Bharatiya Janata Party (BJP). In 1987, Prabuddha Laha of Congress had defeated Goutam Roy Choudhury. In 1982, Bejoy Pal of CPI (M) defeated his nearest rival Sukumar Banerjee of Congress. In 1977, Haradhan Roy of CPI (M) defeated Gopika Ranjan Mitra of Congress.

=== 1972 ===
In 1972, Niranjan Dihidar of Communist Party of India won the seat. In 1969 and 1971, Dr. Lokesh Ghosh of CPI (M) won the seat. In 1967, Gopika Ranjan Mitra of Congress won the seat. In 1962, Bijoy Pal of CPI won. In 1957, it was won by Shibdas Ghatak of Congress. In independent India's first election in 1951, Atindra Nath Bose of Forward Bloc (Ruikar) won the seat defeating Yogendranath Roy of Congress.
