= Sreerampur Assembly constituency =

West Bengal Legislative Assembly constituency

Sreerampur
- Constituency No. 186 for the West Bengal Legislative Assembly
- Interactive Map Outlining Sreerampur Assembly Constituency

Constituency details
- Country: India
- Region: East India
- State: West Bengal
- Division: Burdwan
- District: Hooghly
- Lok Sabha constituency: Sreerampur
- Established: 1951
- Total electors: 205,662
- Reservation: None

Member of Legislative Assembly
- 18th West Bengal Legislative Assembly
- Incumbent Bhaskar Bhattacharya
- Party: BJP
- Alliance: NDA
- Elected year: 2026
- Preceded by: Sudipto Roy (AITC)

Sreerampur Assembly constituency is an assembly constituency in Hooghly district in the Indian state of West Bengal.

== Overview ==
As per orders of the Delimitation Commission, No. 186 Sreerampur Assembly constituency is composed of the following: Ward Nos. 3 and 7 to 26 of Serampore Municipality, Rishra Municipality, Rajyadharpur and Rishra gram panchayats of Sreerampur Uttarpara community development block.

Sreerampur Assembly constituency is part of No. 27 Sreerampur Lok Sabha constituency.

== Members of the Legislative Assembly ==
Year	Name	Party
1951	Jitendra Nath Lahiri	Indian National Congress
1957	Panchu Gopal Bhaduri	Communist Party of India
1962	Panchu Gopal Bhaduri	Communist Party of India
1967	Gopal Das Nag	Indian National Congress
1969	Panchu Gopal Bhaduri	Communist Party of India
1971	Gopal Das Nag	Indian National Congress
1972	Gopal Das Nag	Indian National Congress
1977	Kamal Krishna Bhattacharya	Communist Party of India (Marxist)
1982	Arun Kumar Goswami	Indian National Congress
1987	Arun Kumar Goswami	Indian National Congress
1991	Arun Kumar Goswami	Indian National Congress
1996	Jyoti Chowdhury	Indian National Congress
2001	Ratna De Nag	Trinamool Congress
2006	Ratna De Nag	Trinamool Congress
2009^	Sudipto Roy	Trinamool Congress
2011	Sudipto Roy	Trinamool Congress
2016	Sudipto Roy	Trinamool Congress
2021	Sudipto Roy	Trinamool Congress
2026	Bhaskar Bhattacharya	Bharatiya Janata Party

- ^ by-election

== Election results ==
=== 2026 ===
2026 West Bengal Legislative Assembly election: Sreerampur
Party	Candidate	Votes	%	±%
BJP	Bhaskar Bhattacharya	85,644	45.97	▲8.97
AITC	Tanmoy Ghosh	76,959	41.31	▼8.15
CPI(M)	Nabanita Chakraborty	17,136	9.2	New entry
INC	Subhankar Sarkar	2,884	1.55	▼8.77
NOTA	None of the above	1,817	0.98	▼0.3
Majority		8,685	4.66	▼7.8
Turnout		186,297	90.34	▲15.93
BJP gain from AITC		Swing		

=== 2021 ===
2021 West Bengal Legislative Assembly election: Sreerampur
Party	Candidate	Votes	%	±%
AITC	Sudipto Roy	93,021	49.46	▲5.68
BJP	Kabir Shankar Bose	69,588	37.0	▲22.95
INC	Alok Ranjan Banerjee	19,401	10.32	▼27.68
NOTA	None of the Above	2,400	1.28	▼0.45
Majority		23,433	12.46	▲6.68
Turnout		188,081	74.41	▲0.25
AITC hold		Swing		

=== 2016 ===
2016 West Bengal Legislative Assembly election: Sreerampur
Party	Candidate	Votes	%	±%
AITC	Sudipto Roy	74,995	43.78	▼20.05
INC	Subhankar Sarkar	65,088	38.00	New entry
BJP	Bhaskar Bhattacharya	24,059	14.05	▲9.40
NOTA	None of the Above	2,965	1.73	New entry
BSP	Samir Mitra	1,584	0.92	▼0.6
SUCI(C)	Tapan Chowdhury	1,523	0.89	New entry
Independent	Mangal Sarkar	1,082	0.63	New entry
Majority		9,907	5.78	▼28.05
Turnout		1,71,296	74.16	▲0.62
AITC hold		Swing		

=== 2011 ===
2011 West Bengal Legislative Assembly election: Sreerampur
Party	Candidate	Votes	%	±%
AITC	Sudipto Roy	97,540	63.83	▲4.04
CPI	Partha Sarathi Rej	45,849	30.00	▲1.35
BJP	Vidya Sagar Pandey	7,101	4.65	▲0.08
BSP	Rishikesh Singh	2,328	1.52	New entry
Majority		51,691	33.83	▲2.69
Turnout		1,52,818	73.54	▲14.57
AITC hold		Swing		

=== 2009 by-election ===
The by-election occurred due to the resignation of the sitting AITC MLA Ratna De Nag who was elected in the Lok Sabha from Hooghly on 16 May 2009.

West Bengal Legislative Assembly by-election, 2009: Sreerampur
Party	Candidate	Votes	%	±%
AITC	Sudipto Roy	56,979	59.79	
CPI	Prosanta Mukherjee	27,301	28.65	
Independent	Jyoti Chandra	5,398	5.66	
BJP	Bhaskar Bhattacharya	4,353	4.57	
Independent	Dinesh Kumar Sharma	1,274	1.34	
Majority		29,678	31.14	
Turnout		95,305	58.97	
AITC hold		Swing		

=== 1977-2006 ===
In the 2009 by elections consequent to the election of Ratna De to Parliament from Hooghly (Lok Sabha constituency), Sudipto Roy of Trinamool Congress won the 180 Serampore assembly seat.

In the state assembly elections, contests in most years were multi cornered but only winners and runners are being mentioned. Ratna De defeated Dhirendra Nath Dasgupta of CPI in 2006 and Kesto Mukherjee, Independent, in 2001. Jyoti Chowdhury of Congress defeated Asimes Goswami of CPI(M) in 1996. Arun Kumar Goswami of Congress defeated Sanjay Deb Banerjee of Janata Dal in 1991, Ajit Bag of CPI(M) in 1987, and Kamal Krishna Bhattacharjee of CPI(M) in 1982. Kamal Krishna Bhattacharjee of CPI(M) defeated Gopal Das Nag of Congress in 1977.

=== 1951-1972 ===
Gopal Das Nag of Congress won in 1972 and 1971. Panchu Gopal Bhaduri of CPI won in 1969. Gopal Das Nag of Congress won in 1967. Panchu Gopal Bhaduri of CPI won in 1962 and 1957. In independent India's first election in 1951 Jitendra Nath Lahiri of Congress won the Serampore seat.
