= Karandighi Assembly constituency =

Karandighi
- Constituency No. 32 for the West Bengal Legislative Assembly
- Interactive Map Outlining Karandighi Assembly Constituency

Constituency details
- Country: India
- Region: East India
- State: West Bengal
- District: Uttar Dinajpur
- Lok Sabha constituency: Raiganj
- Established: 1951
- Total electors: 231,680
- Reservation: None

Member of Legislative Assembly
- 18th West Bengal Legislative Assembly
- Incumbent Biraj Biswas
- Party: BJP
- Alliance: NDA
- Elected year: 2026

Karandighi Assembly constituency is an assembly constituency in Uttar Dinajpur district in the Indian state of West Bengal.

== Overview ==
As per orders of the Delimitation Commission, No. 32 Karandighi Assembly constituency covers Dalkhola Municipality and Altapur I, Altapur II, Dalkhola II, Domhana, Karandighi I, Karandighi II, Lahutara I, Lahutara II, SIMA Anandapur, Raniganj, Rasakhowa I and Rasakhowa II gram panchayats of Karandighi community development block.

Karandighi Assembly constituency is part of No. 5 Raiganj Lok Sabha constituency.

== Members of the Legislative Assembly ==
Year	Name	Party
1951	Mohinuddin Mokhtar	Indian National Congress
1957	Phanis Chandra Sinha	Indian National Congress
1962	Phanis Chandra Sinha	Indian National Congress
1967	Haji Sajjad Hussain	Praja Socialist Party
1969	Suresh Chandra Sinha	All India Forward Bloc
1971	Haji Sajjad Hussain	Indian National Congress
1972	Haji Sajjad Hussain	Indian National Congress
1977	Haji Sajjad Hussain	Indian National Congress
1982	Suresh Chandra Singha	All India Forward Bloc
1987	Suresh Chandra Singha	All India Forward Bloc
1991	Haji Sajjad Hussain	Indian National Congress
1996	Suresh Chandra Singha	All India Forward Bloc
2001	Gokul Roy	All India Forward Bloc
2006	Gokul Roy	All India Forward Bloc
2011	Gokul Roy	All India Forward Bloc
2016	Manodeb Singha	Trinamool Congress
2021	Goutam Paul	Trinamool Congress
2026	Biraj Biswas	Bharatiya Janata Party

== Election results ==
=== 2026 ===
In the 2026 West Bengal Legislative Assembly election, Biraj Biswas of BJP defeated his nearest rival outgoing mla Goutam Paul of TMC by 19869 votes.

2026 West Bengal Legislative Assembly election: Karandighi
Party	Candidate	Votes	%	±%
BJP	Biraj Biswas	96,260	43.76	▲6.24
AITC	Goutam Paul	76,391	34.73	▼19.97
CPI(M)	Md. Sahabuddin	39,414	17.92	
NOTA	None of the above	1,647	0.75	▼0.40
INC	Mursid Alam	1,599	0.73	▼33.41
Majority		19,869	9.03	▼8.15
Turnout		219,973	94.95	▲13.78
BJP gain from AITC		Swing	10.94	

=== 2021 ===
In the 2021 elections, Goutam Paul of Trinamool Congress defeated his nearest rival, Subhas Chandra Sinha of BJP.

2021 West Bengal Legislative Assembly election: Karandighi
Party	Candidate	Votes	%	±%
AITC	Goutam Paul	116,594	54.70	
BJP	Subhas Chandra Sinha	79,968	37.52	
AIFB	Md. Hafizul Iqbal	9,146	4.29	
NOTA	None of the above	2,449	1.15	
Majority		36,626	17.18	
Turnout		213,136	81.17	
AITC hold		Swing		

=== 2016 ===
In the 2016 elections, Manodeb Singha of Trinamool Congress defeated his nearest rival, Gokul Behari Roy of AIFB.

West Bengal assembly elections, 2016: Karandighi constituency
Party	Candidate	Votes	%	±%
AITC	Manodeb Singha	54,599	29.44	
AIFB	Gokul Behari Roy	51,367	27.69	−10.30
Independent	Sk. Samsul	35,547	19.16	
BJP	Abdul Jalil	28,978	15.62	+12.94
BSP	Nirod Bandhu Biswas	4,762	2.57	−0.33
NOTA	None of the above	4,376	2.36	
SP	Abdul Mahid Hossain	2,030	1.09	
Independent	Sushanta Kumar Das	1,628	0.88	
Independent	Rehena Khatun	1,357	0.73	
SUCI(C)	Shanti Lal Singha	846	0.46	
Turnout		185,490	81.63	−0.61
AITC gain from AIFB		Swing		

=== 2011 ===
In the 2011 elections, Gokul Behari Roy of AIFB defeated his nearest rival Subhas Goswami of Congress.

West Bengal assembly elections, 2011: Karandighi constituency
Party	Candidate	Votes	%	±%
AIFB	Gokul Behari Roy	57,023	37.99	−7.08
INC	Subhas Goswami	51,245	34.14	−8.13
Independent	Md. Hafizul Iqbal	24,272	16.17	
BSP	Nirod Bandhu Biswas	4,355	2.90	
BJP	Arshad Alam	4,020	2.68	
Turnout		150,100	82.24	
AIFB hold		Swing	1.05	

=== 2006 ===
In the 2006 and 2001 state assembly elections, Gokul Roy of Forward Bloc won the Karandighi assembly seat defeating his nearest rival Haji Sajjad Hussain of Congress. Contests in most elections were among multiple candidates but only winners and runners-up are being mentioned. Suresh Chandra Singha of Forward Bloc defeated Haji Sajjad Hussain of Congress in 1996. Haji Sajjad Hussain of Congress defeated Suresh Chandra Singha of Forward Bloc in 1991. Suresh Chandra Singha of Forward Bloc defeated Haji Sajjad Hussain of Congress in 1987 and 1982. Haji Sajjad Hussain of Congress defeated Amarendra Nath Singha of Janata Party in 1977.

=== 1972 ===
Haji Sajjad Hussain of Congress won in 1972 and 1971. Suresh Chandra Sinha of Forward Bloc won in 1969. H.S. Hussain of PSP won in 1967. Phanis Chandra Sinha of Congress won in 1962 and 1957. In independent India's first election in 1951 the area was part of Bihar and Mohinuddin Mokhtar of Congress won the Karandighi seat.
