= Biraj Biswas =

Indian politician

Minister of Law, (Minister of State), Government of West Bengal
- Incumbent
- Assumed office 1 June 2026
- Governor: R. N. Ravi
- Chief Minister: Suvendu Adhikari
- Preceded by: Moloy Ghatak

Member of the West Bengal Legislative Assembly
- Incumbent
- Assumed office 4 May 2026
- Preceded by: Goutam Paul
- Constituency: Karandighi

Personal details
- Party: Bharatiya Janata Party
- Education: North Bengal University (BA, LLB, LLM)
- Profession: Politician; Advocate

Biraj Biswas is an Indian politician, advocate and Minister of Department of Law of West Bengal.

== Career ==
Biswas started his political career with the Akhil Bharatiya Vidyarthi Parishad (ABVP), the student wing of the Rashtriya Swayamsevak Sangh (RSS). From there, he became its state secretary before being elevated to the post of all-India secretary of the Union. He joined into the Bharatiya Janata Party and was elected as a Member of the West Bengal Legislative Assembly from the Karandighi constituency in the 2026 West Bengal Legislative Assembly election. Being the youngest member of Council of Ministers, Biswas was appointed as Law Minister of West Bengal in 2026.
