= Dalkhola =

- City
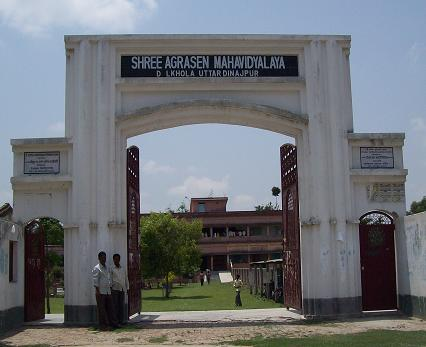
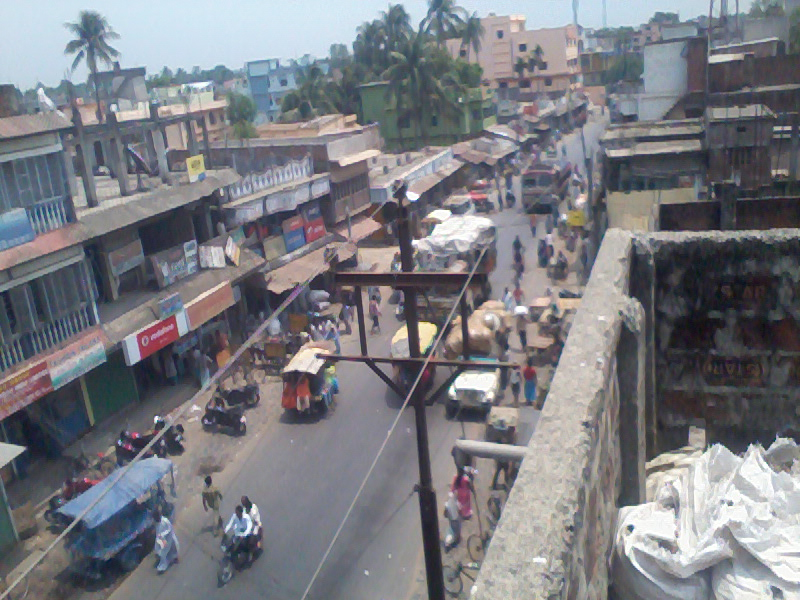
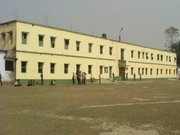
- Top to bottom: Dalkhola College, Dalkhola Market, Dalkhola High School

- Location in West Bengal, India Dalkhola (India)
- Coordinates: 25°52′36″N 87°50′29″E
- Country: India
- State: West Bengal
- District: North Dinajpur

Government
  - Type: Municipality
  - Body: Dalkhola Municipality
  - Chairman: Swadesh Ch Sarkar
  - Vice chairman: Haji Firoj Ahmed

Area
  - Total: 15.95 km^{2} (6.16 sq mi)
- Elevation: 23 m (75 ft)

Population (2011)
  - Total: 37,127
  - Density: 2,328/km^{2} (6,029/sq mi)

Languages
  - Official: Bengali, English
- Time zone: UTC+5:30 (IST)
- PIN: 733201 (City), 733209 (Sub-Urban)
- Telephone code: +913525 25xxxx
- Vehicle registration: WB 59 and WB 91 commercial vehicle WB 60 and WB 92 private vehicle
- Lok Sabha constituency: Raiganj
- Vidhan Sabha constituency: Karandighi
- Climate: Cwa (Köppen)
- Precipitation: 1,100 millimetres (43 in)
- Avg. annual temperature: 32 °C (90 °F)
- Avg. summer temperature: 41 °C (106 °F)
- Avg. winter temperature: 13 °C (55 °F)
- Website: www.dalkholamunicipality.org.in

Dalkhola is a city and a municipality of Uttar Dinajpur district in the state of West Bengal, India.

== History ==
Dalkhola was originally in the state of Bihar in India. After 1959, Dalkhola was located in the state of West Bengal. The town expanded around the Dalkhola village panchayats and developed into an important centre for trade and commerce due to its mainstream connection with both railway and roadway. It is an important centre for commodities like jute, corn and oil trade in North Dinajpur. It is also an important center for the trade of maize, which is produced in the neighbouring state of Bihar.

Before and for some time after the independence of India in 1947, Dalkhola was a sleepy, rural area where some Pucca and Kaccha roads were connected. The area was mostly covered by jungle, and only some parts of the town were suitable for living. The residents' main source of income was agriculture and fishery in the Mahananda River. It was ruled by Raja P. C. Lal. After the partition of India, numerous refugees (Hindus) came to Dalkhola from Bangladesh (formerly known as East Pakistan) and started living in surrounding rural areas such as Hatbari, Goalgaon (Madrasa), Goalgaon (West), Shikarpur, Pukurchala, Bhusamoni, etc. In 1956 the area was transferred to the territory of West Bengal by the tireless efforts of the then chief minister, Dr. B. C. Roy. It is an important place in this region, as NH 12 and NH 27 intersect at this place. Small villages are administered by the Panchayat Ministry, and they have gradually developed into busy market zones, which have gradually converted into small townships. With the growth of population and economic activities, the people of Dalkhola experienced a massive change in terms of both socio-economic development and quality of life. As a consequence, Dalkhola Municipality was set up on 1 January 2003 to foster social and economic development.

== Politics ==
Dalkhola became a municipality in 2003. In the Dalkhola municipal area, there were 14 Wards. But now 2 more wards are divided and there are 16 wards. In the last election, the Indian National Congress won 9 seats out of 14, and the Communist Party of India (Marxist) won the other 5 seats. It is one of the four municipalities in North Dinajpur district. Dalkhola has 16 now. Recently, in the 2013 municipality election, Congress won 10 seats, CPIM 4, and TMC 2. Now whole councillors of the Congress party joined Trinamool Congress nd now the status aesre TMC 12, CPIM 4, and CONG 0.

In the general civic body election 2022 Dalkhola's figures are 12 Trinamool Congress, 4 Independent

== Geography ==
Cities and towns in the North Dinajpur district
M: municipal city/ town, CT: census town, R: rural/ urban centre, T: tourist centre
Owing to space constraints in the small map, the actual locations in a larger map may vary slightly

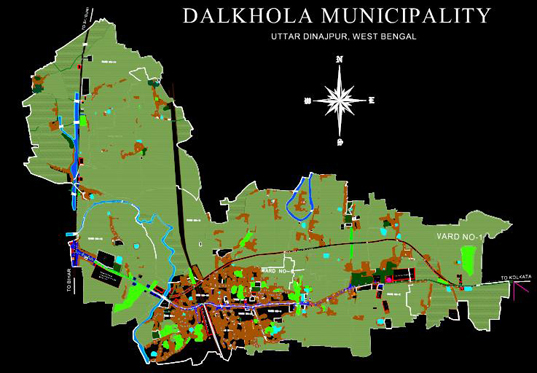
Geographical map of Dalkhola

Dalkhola has an average elevation of 23 metres (75 feet) and is located at 25.85°N 87.85°E.

In the map alongside, all places marked on the map are linked in the full-screen version.

It is the second-largest area in the Uttar Dinajpur district, with a length 13 km from East to West, 18 km from North to South. Dalkhola was divided into 14 wards. But now to more wards are added, 9-number wards divided into 9 and 16 and 11-number wards divided into 11 and 15.

The following 16 wards are:

- Muhammadpur
- Haripur
- Bhusamani
- Mithapur
- Mallickpore More
- Deshbandhu Para
- Dalkhola Bazar
- High School Para
- Dalkhola Slum
- Subhashpally
- Farsara
- Bidhanpally
- North Dalkhola
- Purnia More
- Shikarpur
- Nichitpur
- Binoy colony
- Shree pally
- Vivekanandapally
- Hatbari
- College para
- College more
- High school more

== Climate ==
The cooler months in Dalkhola begin in December and end in February. The temperature generally peaks at about 35 °C. The annual low temperature is usually near 10 °C. The monsoon season starts in June and runs through September.

Climate data for Dalkhola
Month	Jan	Feb	Mar	Apr	May	Jun	Jul	Aug	Sep	Oct	Nov	Dec	Year
Mean daily maximum °C (°F)	20.3 (68.5)	26.5 (79.7)	32.6 (90.7)	37.7 (99.9)	38.9 (102.0)	36.7 (98.1)	33.0 (91.4)	32.4 (90.3)	32.3 (90.1)	31.5 (88.7)	28.8 (83.8)	24.7 (76.5)	31.53 (88.75)
Mean daily minimum °C (°F)	9.2 (48.6)	11.6 (52.9)	16.4 (61.5)	22.3 (72.1)	25.2 (77.4)	26.7 (80.1)	26.2 (79.2)	26.1 (79.0)	25.7 (78.3)	21.8 (71.2)	14.7 (58.5)	9.9 (49.8)	19.65 (67.37)
Average precipitation mm (inches)	19 (0.7)	11 (0.4)	11 (0.4)	8 (0.3)	33 (1.3)	134 (5.3)	306 (12.0)	274 (10.8)	227 (8.9)	94 (3.7)	9 (0.4)	4 (0.2)	1,130 (44.5)
Source: worldweather.org

== Development ==
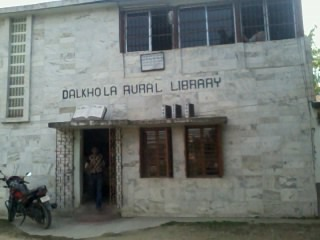
Dalkhola library

Dalkhola is the largest exporter of maize in West Bengal. In Dalkhola, a national-level power grid was established in 1973, which expanded the availability of electricity to the municipality and nearby areas of Dalkhola. Other developments include a flour mill, Tantia Agro Chemical Pvt Ltd and a maize processing company that uses the crops produced by local farmers.

== Official languages ==
As per the West Bengal Official Language (Amendment) Act, 2012, which came into force from December 2012, Bengali was given the status of official language in areas, such as subdivisions and blocks, having more than 50% Bengali speaking population. In North Dinajpur district, Goalpokhar I and II blocks, Islampur block and Islampur municipality were identified as fulfilling the norms set In 2014, Calcutta High Court, in an order, included Dalkhola municipality in the list.

== Education ==
The schools in Dalkhola include:

- Jawahar Navodaya Vidyalaya, Uttar Dinajpur
- Dalkhola High School (H.S)
- Dalkhola Girls High School (H.S)
- North Dalkhola High School (H.S)
- Hindi High School (H.S)
- Farsara F.P School
- Nazarpur F.P School
- Dalkhola Urdu Jr High School
- Itvata F.P. School
- Sarsar F.F. School
- Nichitpur F. P. School
- Subhash Pally F.P. School

=== English medium schools ===
- St. Mary's School (Dalkhola)
- St. Stephen's School, Dalkhola
- St. Xavier's School (Dalkhola)
- Dalkhola Public School (D.P.S)
- Iqra Public School
- Children's Academy, Dalkhola
- South Point Public School, Dalkhola (Loknathpara)
- Holy Cross School, Dalkhola
- National Public School, Dalkhola (High School Para)
- St Ignatius School, Dalkhola

=== College ===
- Shree Agrasen Mahavidyalaya was established in 1995. Affiliated to the University of Gour Banga it offers honours courses in Bengali, Hindi, English, history, political science, sociology and accountancy, and general courses in arts and commerce. Urdu is taught as a general subject.

== Demographics ==
Religions in Dalkhola Town (2011)
1. Hinduism (58.3%)
2. Islam (39.5%)
3. Others (2.20%)

As per the 2011 Census of India, Dalkhola had a total population of 36,930, of which 19,230 (52%) were males and 17,700 (48%) were females. The population below 6 years was 5,592. The total number of literates in Dalkhola was 21,207 (67.67% of the population over 6 years).

In the 2001 India census, Dalkhola had a population of 13,891. In 2008, the population grew to approximately 19,000. Males constituted 54% of the population and females 46%. The literacy rate in Dalkhola of 69% was greater than the national average of 59.5%; male literacy was 70% and female literacy was 63%. In Dalkhola, 18% of the population was under 6 years of age.

=== Languages ===
Languages spoken in Dalkhola Town (2011)
1. Bengali (46.4%)
2. Hindi (26.3%)
3. Urdu (12.8%)
4. Surjapuri (4.68%)
5. Santali (3.79%)
6. Savara (3.22%)
7. Others (2.75%)

Decadal growth for the period 1991 to 2001 was 30.41% in Dalkhola, compared to 28.72% in the North Dinajpur district. Decadal growth in West Bengal was 17.84%.

Year of Establishment Dalkhola Municipality was formed on 01 /01 /2003 as per Notification No. 1 /MA/0 /C-4 /1 M-14 / 2000 with the entire area of Dalkhola 1 and four mouzas of Dalkhola 2 gram panchayats with a population of 29783 according to the census of 2001. Dalkhola Municipality is the 4 th Municipality of North Dinajpur district constituted with 14 wards and first election was held on 22 /06 /2003 and second election was held on 29 /06 /2008. Sri Himadri Mukharjee was the first chairman and Sri Subhas Goshwami became the chairman in the second. Sri Tanay Day was the 3rd chairman. Swadesh Sarkar is in the chair.

== Transport ==
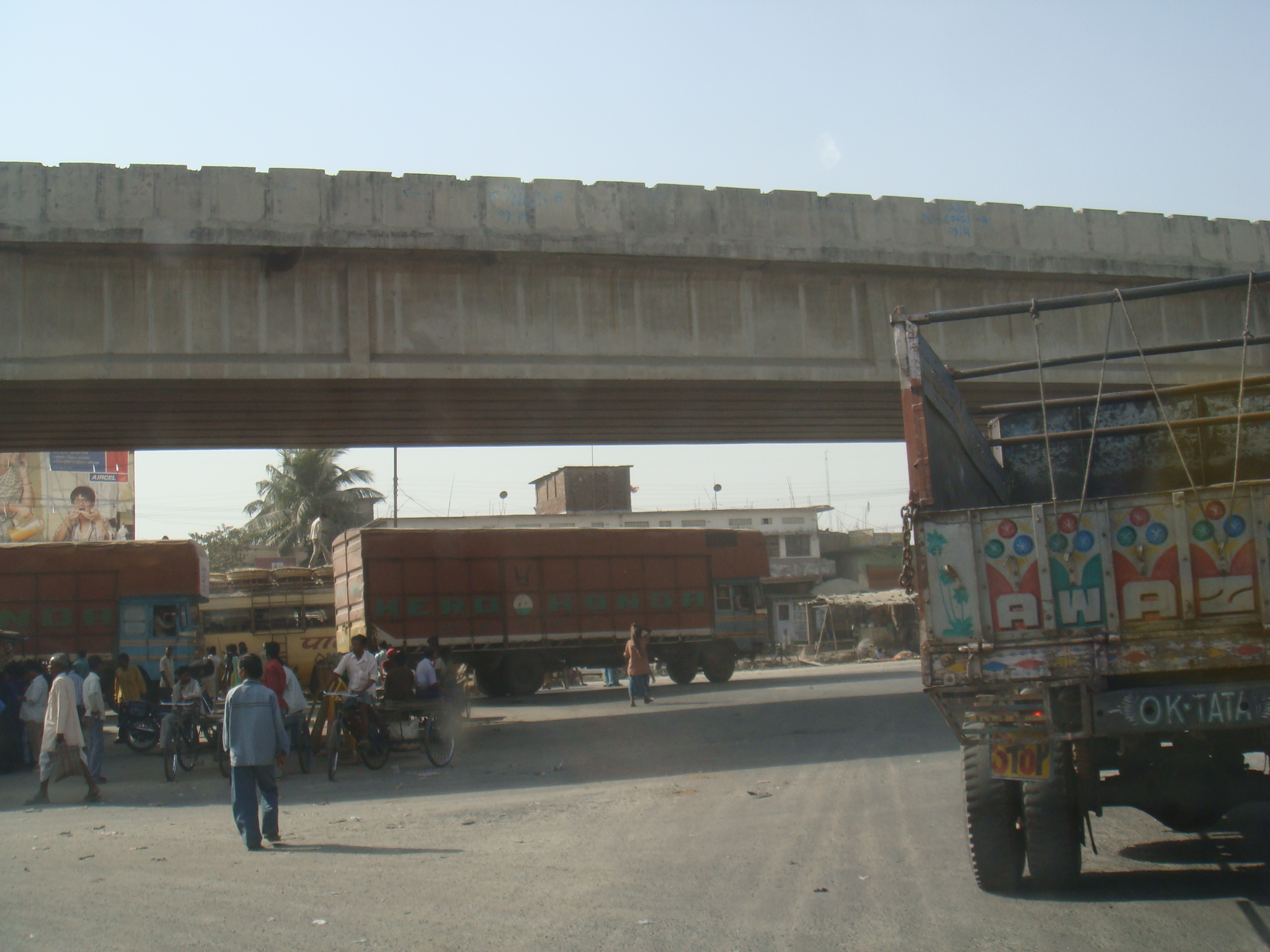
NH 34 starts from 31 in Dalkhola

Highway 34 cuts through the middle of the town to meet NH 31. NH 34 starts from Dalkhola and ends in Dumdum, near Kolkata, to help connect the northeastern part of India to Kolkata.

There are two airports near Dalkhola. Bagdogra Airport is 100 km away, and Purnea Airport is 40 km from Dalkhola.

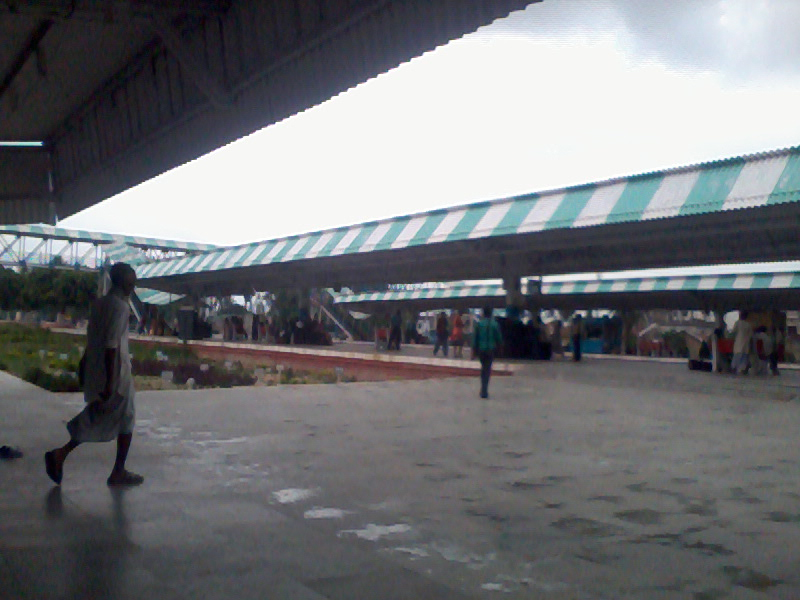
Dalkolha railway station

The largest railway station and busiest Rack point in the district is located in Dalkhola. This railway connects to several major cities, including Siliguri, Kolkata, Guwahati, Delhi, Jaipur, Chennai and Patna. Bus transportation runs from Dalkhola to Siliguri, Raiganj, Kishanganj, Kaliaganj, Balurghat, and Malda.

AC bus services for Kolkata, Bhutan, Patna and Siliguri are also available from Dalkhola.

== Media ==
Dalkhola Press Club is under the District Press Club. A fortnightly newspaper called Nava Provat Jyoti was published from Dalkhola.
