= Ramnagar, West Bengal Assembly constituency =

Ramnagar
- Constituency No. 217 for the West Bengal Legislative Assembly
- Interactive Map Outlining Ramnagar Assembly Constituency

Constituency details
- Country: India
- Region: East India
- State: West Bengal
- District: Purba Medinipur
- Lok Sabha constituency: Kanthi
- Established: 1951
- Total electors: 2,64,900
- Reservation: None

Member of Legislative Assembly
- 18th West Bengal Legislative Assembly
- Incumbent Dr. Chandra Sekhar Mondal
- Party: Bharatiya Janata Party
- Elected year: 2026

Ramnagar Assembly constituency is an assembly constituency in Purba Medinipur district in the Indian state of West Bengal.

== Overview ==
As per orders of the Delimitation Commission, No. 217 Ramnagar Assembly constituency is composed of the following: Ramnagar I and Ramnagar II community development blocks

Ramnagar Assembly constituency is part of No. 31 Kanthi Lok Sabha constituency.

== Members of Legislative Assembly ==
Year	Member	Party
1952	Trailakya Nath Pradhan	Indian National Congress
1957	Trailakya Nath Pradhan	Indian National Congress
1962	Trailakya Nath Pradhan	Indian National Congress
1967	Trailakya Nath Pradhan	Indian National Congress
1969	Balailal Das Mahapatra	Praja Socialist Party
1971	Bishal Radhagobinda	Indian National Congress (Organisation)
1972	Hemanta Dutta	Indian National Congress (Requisitionists)
1977	Balailal Das Mahapatra	Janata Party
1982	Abanti Mishra	Indian National Congress
1987	Sudhir Kumar Giri	Communist Party of India (Marxist)
1991	Mrinal Kanti Roy	Communist Party of India (Marxist)
1996	Mrinal Kanti Roy	Communist Party of India (Marxist)
2001	Akhil Giri	Trinamool Congress
2006	Swadesh Ranjan Nayak	Communist Party of India (Marxist)
2011	Akhil Giri	Trinamool Congress
2016	Akhil Giri	Trinamool Congress
2021	Akhil Giri	Trinamool Congress
2026	Dr. Chandra Sekhar Mondal	Bharatiya Janata Party

== Election results ==
=== 2026 ===
2026 West Bengal Legislative Assembly election: Ramnagar
Party	Candidate	Votes	%	±%
BJP	Chandra Sekhar Mondal	131,808	53.83	+8.75
AITC	Akhil Giri	104,869	42.83	−7.89
CPI(M)	Asoke Kumar Maiti	5,239	2.14	−0.9
NOTA	None of the above	1,277	0.52	−0.04
Majority		26,939	11.0	+5.36
Turnout		244,842	90.84	+7.01
BJP gain from AITC		Swing		

=== 2021 ===
2021 West Bengal Legislative Assembly election: Ramnagar
Party	Candidate	Votes	%	±%
AITC	Akhil Giri	112,622	50.72	
BJP	Swadesh Ranjan Nayak	100,105	45.08	+39.05
CPI(M)	Sabyasachi Jana	6,751	3.04	−35.97
NOTA	None of the above	1,233	0.56	
Majority		12,517	5.64	
Turnout		222,060	83.83	
AITC hold		Swing		

=== 2016 ===
2016 West Bengal Legislative Assembly election: Ramnagar
Party	Candidate	Votes	%	±%
AITC	Akhil Giri	107,081	52.99	
CPI(M)	Tapas Sinha	78,828	39.01	
BJP	Tapan Kar	12,186	6.03	
LJP	Prodorshi Ghosh	902	0.45	
Bharat Nirman Party	Prabir Kumar Misra	774	0.38	
Independent	Dhananjoy Dalai	628	0.31	
Majority		28,253	14.10	
Turnout		202,093	84.12	
AITC hold		Swing		

=== 2011 ===
2011 West Bengal Legislative Assembly election: Ramnagar
Party	Candidate	Votes	%	±%
AITC	Akhil Giri	93,801	52.56	+3.98#
CPI(M)	Swadesh Ranjan Nayek	77,242	43.28	−8.13
BJP	Satya Ranjan Das	4,507	2.53	
Independent	Tapan Maity	2,929		
Turnout		178,479	87.67	
AITC gain from CPI(M)		Swing	12.11#	

.# Swing calculated on Congress+Trinamool Congress vote percentages taken together in 2006.

=== 2006 ===
In the 2006 state assembly elections, Swadesh Ranjan Nayak of CPI(M) won the Ramnagar assembly seat defeating his nearest rival Akhil Giri of Trinamool Congress. Contests in most years were multi cornered but only winners and runners are being mentioned. Akhil Giri of Trinamool Congress defeated Samares Das of CPI(M) in 2001. Mrinal Kanti Roy of CPI(M) defeated Dipak Das of Congress in 1996 and 1991. Sudhir Kumar Giri of CPI(M) defeated Hemanta Dutta of Congress in 1987. Abanti Mishra of Congress defeated Balai Lal Das Mahapatra, Independent, in 1982. Balai Lal Das Mahapatra of Janata Party defeated Rohini Karan of CPI(M) in 1977.

=== 1972 ===
Hemanta Dutta of Congress won in 1972. Radha Gobinda Bishal of Congress (Organisation) won in 1971. Balai Lal Das Mahapatra of PSP won in 1969. Trailokya Nath Pradhan of Congress won in 1967, 1962, 1957 and in independent Indias's first election in 1951.
