= Banerjee ministry =

Banerjee ministry may refer to these cabinets of West Bengal, India headed by Mamata Banerjee as chief minister:

- First Banerjee ministry (2011–2016)
- Second Banerjee ministry (2016–2021)
- Third Banerjee ministry (2021–)
