= Chandra Sekhar Mondal =

Indian politician (born 1983)

Chandra Sekhar Mondal (born 1983) is an Indian politician from West Bengal. He is a member of West Bengal Legislative Assembly from the Ramnagar Assembly constituency in Purba Medinipur district representing the Bharatiya Janata Party.

== Early life and education ==
Mondal is from Kanthi, Purba Medinipur district, West Bengal. He is the son of Nilkantha Mondal. He completed his MSc in botany at Vidyasagar University in 2009. He works as a teacher. He declared assets worth Rs.50 lakhs in his affidavit to the Election Commission of India.

== Career ==
Mondal won the Ramnagar Assembly constituency representing the Bharatiya Janata Party in the 2026 West Bengal Legislative Assembly election. He polled 1,31,802 votes and defeated his nearest rival and three time sitting MLA, Akhil Giri of the All India Trinamool Congress, by a margin of 26,939 votes.
