= Rampurhat Assembly constituency =

Rampurhat
- Constituency No. 291 for the West Bengal Legislative Assembly
- Interactive Map Outlining Rampurhat Assembly Constituency

Constituency details
- Country: India
- Region: East India
- State: West Bengal
- District: Birbhum
- Lok Sabha constituency: Birbhum
- Established: 1951
- Total electors: 201,049
- Reservation: None

Member of Legislative Assembly
- 18th West Bengal Legislative Assembly
- Incumbent Dhruba Saha
- Party: BJP
- Alliance: NDA
- Elected year: 2026

Rampurhat Assembly constituency is an assembly constituency in Birbhum district in the Indian state of West Bengal.

== Overview ==
As per orders of the Delimitation Commission, No. 291, Rampurhat Assembly constituency is composed of the following: Rampurhat municipality, Rampurhat I CD Block and Bharkata, Gonpur, Hinglow, Kapista, Rampur and Sekedda gram panchayats of Mohammad Bazar CD Block.

Rampurhat Assembly constituency is part of No. 42 Birbhum (Lok Sabha constituency).

== Members of the Legislative Assembly ==
| Year | Name | Party |
|---|---|---|
| 1951 | Panchanan Let | All India Forward Bloc |
| 1951 | Srikumar Bandopadhyaya | All India Forward Bloc |
| 1957 | Gobardhan Das | Communist Party of India |
| 1957 | Durgapada Das | Independent politician |
| 1962 | Niharika Majumdar | Indian National Congress |
| 1967 | Sasanka Sekhar Mongal | All India Forward Bloc |
| 1969 | Sasanka Sekhar Mongal | All India Forward Bloc |
| 1971 | Braja Mohan Mukherjee | Communist Party of India (Marxist) |
| 1972 | Ananda Gopal Roy | Indian National Congress |
| 1977 | Tapas Kumar Mukhopadhyay | Janata Party |
| 1982 | Sashanka Mondal | All India Forward Bloc |
| 1987 | Sashanka Mondal | All India Forward Bloc |
| 1991 | Sashanka Mondal | All India Forward Bloc |
| 1996 | Mahammad Hannan | All India Forward Bloc |
| 2001 | Ashish Banerjee | Trinamool Congress |
| 2006 | Ashish Banerjee | Trinamool Congress |
| 2011 | Ashish Banerjee | Trinamool Congress |
| 2016 | Ashish Banerjee | Trinamool Congress |
| 2021 | Ashish Banerjee | Trinamool Congress |
| 2026 | Dhruba Saha | Bharatiya Janata Party |

== Election results ==
=== 2026 ===
2026 West Bengal Legislative Assembly election: Rampurhat
| Party | Candidate | Votes | % | ±% |
|---|---|---|---|---|
| BJP | Dhruba Saha | 111,920 | 47.89 | +4.27 |
| AITC | Ashish Banerjee | 87,687 | 37.52 | −10.0 |
| CPI(M) | Sanjib Mallick | 22,994 | 9.84 | +4.45 |
| NOTA | None of the above | 3,163 | 1.35 | −0.21 |
| Majority | | 24,233 | 10.37 | +6.47 |
| Turnout | | 233,723 | 95.21 | +11.88 |
| BJP gain from AITC | | Swing | | |

=== 2021 ===
2021 West Bengal Legislative Assembly election: Rampurhat
| Party | Candidate | Votes | % | ±% |
|---|---|---|---|---|
| AITC | Ashish Banerjee | 103,276 | 47.52 | |
| BJP | Subhasis Choudhury | 94,804 | 43.62 | ▲31.0 |
| CPI(M) | Sanjib Barman | 11,707 | 5.39 | |
| NOTA | None of the above | 3,381 | 1.56 | |
| Majority | | 8,472 | 3.9 | |
| Turnout | | 217,323 | 83.33 | |
| AITC hold | | Swing | | |

=== 2016 ===
2016 West Bengal Legislative Assembly election: Rampurhat
| Party | Candidate | Votes | % | ±% |
|---|---|---|---|---|
| AITC | Ashish Banerjee | 85,435 | 44.60 | ▼1.20 |
| INC | Syed Siraj Jimmi | 64,236 | 33.50 | ▲33.50 |
| BJP | Dudh Kumar Mondal | 25,480 | 13.30 | ▲2.43 |
| AIFB | Mahammad Hannan | 3,613 | 1.90 | ▼37.65 |
| Majority | | | | |
| Turnout | | | | |
| AITC hold | | Swing | | |

=== 2011 ===
West Bengal assembly elections, 2011: Rampurhat
| Party | Candidate | Votes | % | ±% |
|---|---|---|---|---|
| AITC | Ashish Banerjee | 75,066 | 45.8 | ▼7.06# |
| AIFB | Rebati Bhattacharya | 64,828 | 39.55 | ▼2.04 |
| BJP | Subhasis Choudhury | 17,815 | 10.87 | |
| Independent | Mahesh Kisku | 3,769 | | |
| CPI(ML)L | Prodyot Mukherjee | 242 | | |
| Turnout | | 163,905 | 86.31 | |
| AITC hold | | Swing | | |

=== 2006 ===
In 2006 and 2001 state assembly elections, Asish Banerjee of Trinamool Congress won the Rampurhat assembly constituency defeating Nirad Baran Mandal of Forward Bloc in 2006, and Mahammad Hannan of Forward Bloc in 2001. Contests in most years were multi cornered but only winners and runners are being mentioned. Mahammad Hannan of Forward Block defeated Satyendra Nath Das of BJP in 1996. Sashanka Mondal of Forward Bloc defeated Satyendra Nath Das of BJP in 1991, Asish Banerjee of Congress in 1987, Ananda Gopal Roy of Congress in 1982 and Tapas Kumar Mukhopadhyay of Janata Party in 1977.

=== 1972 ===
Ananda Gopal Roy of Congress won in 1972. Braja Mohan Mukherjee of CPI(M) won in 1971. Sasanka Sekhar Mongal of Forward Bloc won in 1969 and 1967. Niharika Majumdar of Congress won in 1962. In 1957 and 1951 Rampurhat was a joint seat. Gobardhan Das of CPI and Durgapada Das, Independent, won in 1957. In independent India's first election in 1951 Panchanan Let, Srikumar Bandopadhyay and Kazi Abu Muhammad all of Forward Block, won.
