= Sudipto Roy =

Indian politician

Member of the West Bengal Legislative Assembly
- In office 16 May 2009 – 5 May 2026
- Constituency: Sreerampur
- Preceded by: Ratna De Nag
- Succeeded by: Bhaskar Bhattacharya

Sudipto Roy (born 1949) is an Indian politician from West Bengal. He is a four time member of the West Bengal Legislative Assembly from Sreerampur Assembly constituency in Hooghly district. He won the 2021 West Bengal Legislative Assembly election representing the All India Trinamool Congress.

== Early life and education ==
Roy is from Kashipur, Hooghly district, West Bengal. He is the son of late Anil Roy. He completed his MBBS and later did his MD in anesthesiology in 1978 at IPGMER & SSKM Hospital, University of Calcutta.

== Career ==
Roy won from Sreerampur Assembly constituency representing All India Trinamool Congress in the 2021 West Bengal Legislative Assembly election. He polled 93,021 votes and defeated his nearest rival, Kabir Shankar Bose of the Bharatiya Janata Party, by a margin of 23,433 votes.

He first became an MLA winning the 2009 by-election. He was re-elected in the 2011 West Bengal Legislative Assembly election and retained it for the third consecutive time in the 2016 West Bengal Legislative Assembly election defeating Subhankar Sarkar of the Indian National Congress by a margin of 9,907 votes.
