= Asish Banerjee =

Indian politician (1951–2026)

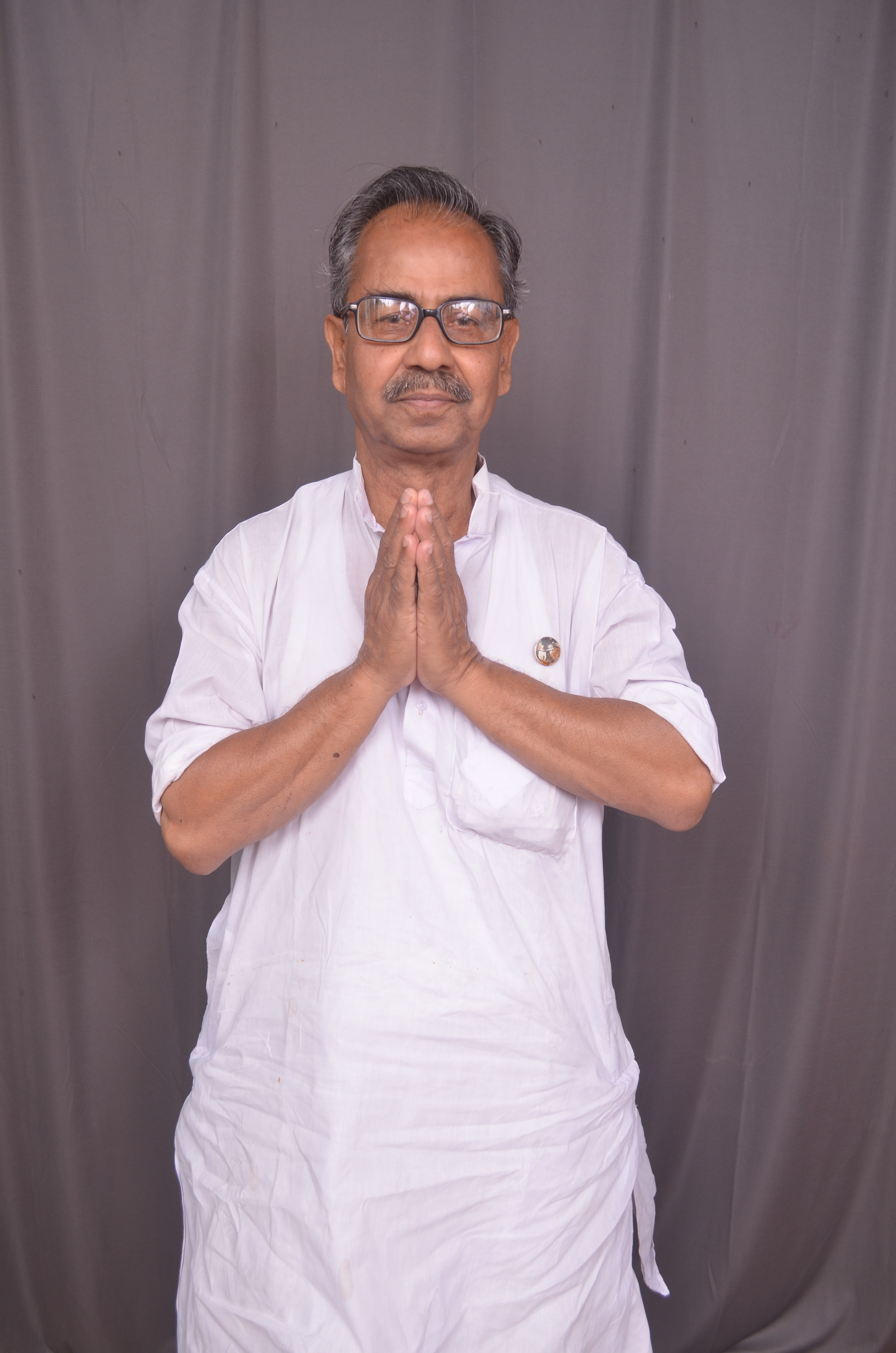
- Banerjee in 2016

13th Deputy Speaker of the West Bengal Legislative Assembly
- In office 2 July 2021 – 7 May 2026
- Governor: Jagdeep Dhankhar; La. Ganesan (additional charge); C. V. Ananda Bose; R. N. Ravi
- Chief Minister: Mamata Banerjee
- Speaker: Biman Banerjee
- Preceded by: Sukumar Hansda
- Succeeded by: Vacant

Member of the West Bengal Legislative Assembly
- In office 2001 – 7 May 2026
- Preceded by: Mahammad Hannan
- Succeeded by: Dhruba Saha
- Constituency: Rampurhat

Minister for Agriculture Government of West Bengal
- In office 2017–2021
- Governor: Keshari Nath Tripathi; Jagdeep Dhankhar
- Chief Minister: Mamata Banerjee
- Preceded by: Purnendo Bose
- Succeeded by: Sovandeb Chatterjee

Minister of State for Ayurveda, Unani, Naturopathy, Siddha, Yoga and Homeopathy (Independent Charge) Government of West Bengal
- In office 2014–2015
- Governor: Keshari Nath Tripathi; Jagdeep Dhankhar
- Chief Minister: Mamata Banerjee

Minister of Biotechnology, Statistics and Programme Monitoring, Government of West Bengal
- In office 2015–2016

Personal details
- Born: 3 November 1951 Rampurhat, Birbhum district, West Bengal, India
- Died: c. 16 August 2026 (aged 74) Rampurhat, Birbhum district, West Bengal, India
- Party: Trinamool Congress
- Parent: Asit Baran Banerjee (father)
- Education: BA, MA & PhD from University of Burdwan
- Occupation: Associate Professor at Rampurhat College, (until 2001)

Asish Banerjee (3 November 1951 – c. 16 August 2026) was an Indian politician who represented Trinamool Congress. He was the 13th deputy speaker of the assembly, as well as the minister in charge of the Department of Agriculture in the Government of West Bengal from 2017 to 2021. He was also M.L.A. of West Bengal Legislative Assembly, elected from Rampurhat (Vidhan Sabha constituency) five times (terms 2001, 2006, 2011, 2016, and 2021).

== Early life ==
Asish Banerjee was born in Rampurhat Birbhum district in West Bengal. He completed his bachelor's and master's degrees from Burdwan University. He also completed his PhD at the same university. During this period he was elected General Secretary of University Students' Council.

== Career ==
After completing his education at Burdwan University, Banerjee was an associate professor of Bengali at Rampurhat College under Burdwan University.

=== MLA of Rampurhat ===
Banerjee was elected as M.L.A. from Rampurhat (Vidhan Sabha constituency) in 2001 and subsequently re-elected from same constituency in 2006, 2011 and 2016. Banerjee was first time sworn in as a minister of state under Chief Minister Mamata Banerjee in 2014 and allotted the independent charge of Department of Ayurveda, Yoga and Naturopathy, Unani, Siddha and Homoeopathy. The next year he was nominated for minister in charge for Department of Biotechnology, Department of Statistics and Programme implementation, Planning.

In 2017, he took charge as the agriculture minister of West Bengal Government in Mamata Banerjee ministry (2016–2021) from his predecessor Purnendo Bose.

== Death ==
On 16 August 2026, Banerjee was found hanging inside a Trinamool Congress party office, with an apparent suicide note found alongside his body.

Political offices
Preceded by	Minister of State (Independent charge) of Ayush of Health and Family Welfare department in the West Bengal Government; 2014 – 20?	Succeeded by
Preceded by	Minister of State of the departments of School Education and Higher Education in the West Bengal Government; 2014 – 20?	Succeeded by
Preceded by	Minister of Science and Technology and Biotechnology department in the West Bengal Government –	Succeeded by Partha Chatterjee
Preceded by	Minister of State (Independent Charge) for Planning, Statistics & Programme Monitoring in the West Bengal Government in the Mamata Banerjee ministry (2016–2021); 2016 – 2017	Succeeded by
Preceded by Purnendo Bose	Agriculture Minister of West Bengal Government in Mamata Banerjee ministry (2016–2021); 2017 –	Succeeded by
State Legislative Assembly
Preceded by Mahammad Hannan (FBL)	Member of the West Bengal Legislative Assembly from Rampurhat Assembly constituency 2001 – 2026	Succeeded by Dhruba Saha (BJP)
