= Purnendu Basu =

Indian politician

Member of West Bengal Legislative Assembly
- In office 13 May 2011 – 2 May 2021
- Preceded by: Rabindranath Mondal
- Succeeded by: Aditi Munshi
- Constituency: Rajarhat Gopalpur

Cabinet Minister Government of West Bengal
- In office 2011–2021
- Governor: Keshari Nath Tripathi; D. Y. Patil; M. K. Narayanan; Jagdeep Dhankhar
- Department: Minister for Labour (2011-2014); Minister for Agriculture (2014-2017); Minister for Technical Education, Training & Skill Development (2011-2016 & 2017-2021)
- Chief Minister: Mamata Banerjee
- Preceded by: Moloy Ghatak (from Agriculture)
- Succeeded by: Moloy Ghatak (from Labour); Asish Banerjee (from Agriculture); Ashima Patra, MoS I/C (from Technical Education, Training & Skill Development)

Personal details
- Born: 26 September 1952 (age 73)
- Party: Trinamool Congress

Purnendu Basu is an Indian politician and the former Minister for Agriculture in the Government of West Bengal. He was also an MLA, elected from the Rajarhat Gopalpur constituency in the 2011 and 2016. He is currently Chairperson of West Bengal State Council of Technical and Vocational Education for Skill Development.

== Career ==
=== MLA of Rajarhat Gopalpur ===
He served as the MLA, elected from the Rajarhat Gopalpur constituency in the 2011 and 2016 West Bengal state assembly election and was succeeded by Aditi Munshi in 2021 election.

=== Minister of West Bengal ===
He served as the Agriculture Minister of West Bengal Government in the First Mamata Banerjee ministry from the years 2014 until 2017, when he was replaced by Asish Banerjee.

He served as Minister of Labour of West Bengal Government in the First Mamata Banerjee ministry between the years 2011 – 2014 and was replaced by Moloy Ghatak.

He also served as Minister for Technical Education, Training & Skill Development of West Bengal Government from 2011-2016 and was replaced by Ashima Patra and again from 2017 – 2021 and was succeeded by Humayun Kabir.

Political offices
Preceded by Ashima Patra	Minister of the Technical Education, Training and Skill Development department of Government of West Bengal; 2017 – 2021	Succeeded by Humayun Kabir
Preceded by	Minister of Labour of Government of West Bengal; 2011 – 2014	Succeeded by Moloy Ghatak
Preceded by Rabindranath Bhattacharjee	Agriculture Minister of West Bengal Government; 2014 – 2017	Succeeded by Asish Banerjee
State Legislative Assembly
Preceded by Rabindranath Mondal	Member of the West Bengal Legislative Assembly from Rajarhat Gopalpur Assembly constituency 2011 – 2021	Succeeded by Aditi Munshi
