= Mahammad Hannan =

West Bengal politician

Member of West Bengal Legislative Assembly
- In office 1996–2001
- Preceded by: Sashanka Mondal
- Succeeded by: Asish Banerjee
- Constituency: Rampurhat

Personal details
- Born: 1958 (age 67–68) Kalisara, Birbhum district, West Bengal
- Party: All India Forward Bloc

Mahammad Hannan was an Indian social worker and politician belonging to the All India Forward Bloc. He served as a member of the West Bengal Legislative Assembly.

== Early life and family ==
Hannan was born in 1958 to a Bengali Muslim family in the village of Kalisara in Birbhum district of the West Bengal. He was the son of Mahammad Mahasin.

== Career ==
Hannan contested in the 1996 West Bengal Legislative Assembly election where he ran as a Forward Bloc candidate for Rampurhat Assembly constituency, defeating the Hindutva-oriented BJP politician Satyen Das. He contested in the 2001 West Bengal Legislative Assembly election but was unsuccessful. Hannan contested in the 2016 West Bengal Legislative Assembly election but was unsuccessful.
