= Krishnendu Mukherjee =

Indian politician (born 1975)

Krishnendu Mukherjee (born 1975) is an Indian politician from West Bengal. He is a member of West Bengal Legislative Assembly from the Asansol Uttar Assembly constituency in Paschim Bardhaman district representing the Bharatiya Janata Party.

== Early life ==
Mukherjee is from Asansol, Paschim Bardhaman district, West Bengal. He is the son of Amaresh Mukherjee. He completed his Bachelor of Commerce at Bidhan Chandra College, Asansol which is affiliated with University of Burdwan in the year 1995. He runs his own business. He declared assets worth Rs.8 crore in his affidavit to the Election Commission of India.

== Career ==
Mukherjee won the Asansol Uttar Assembly constituency in Paschim Bardhaman district representing the Bharatiya Janata Party in the 2026 West Bengal Legislative Assembly election. He polled votes and defeated his nearest rival and three time sitting MLA, Moloy Ghatak of the All India Trinamool Congress, by a margin of 11,615 votes. He lost the 2021 West Bengal Legislative Assembly election Ghatak Moloy of the Trinamool Congress by a margin of 21,110 votes.
