= Akhil Giri =

Indian politician

Minister of Correctional Administration (I/C) Government of West Bengal
- In office 3 August 2022 – 4 August 2024
- Governor: La. Ganesan (additional charge); C. V. Ananda Bose
- Chief Minister: Mamata Banerjee
- Preceded by: Chandranath Sinha

Member of the West Bengal Legislative Assembly
- In office 13 May 2011 – 7 May 2026
- Preceded by: Swadesh Ranjan Nayak
- Succeeded by: Dr. Chandra Sekhar Mondal
- Constituency: Ramnagar
- In office 2001–2006
- Preceded by: Mrinal Kanti Roy
- Succeeded by: Swadesh Ranjan Nayak

Personal details
- Born: September 12, 1956 (age 70)
- Party: Trinamool Congress
- Children: Suprakash Giri
- Education: Contai K. M. Vidyabhavan (12th pass)

Akhil Giri is an Indian politician and the present Minister of Fisheries in the Government of West Bengal. He is also an MLA, elected from the Ramnagar constituency in the 2011 West Bengal state assembly election.
