= Tarunjyoti Tewari =

Indian politician in West Bengal

Member of the West Bengal Legislative Assembly
- Incumbent
- Assumed office 4 May 2026
- Preceded by: Aditi Munshi
- Constituency: Rajarhat Gopalpur

Personal details
- Born: 1989 (age 36–37) Howrah, West Bengal, India
- Party: Bharatiya Janata Party
- Profession: Politician,Lawyer

Tarunjyoti Tewari is a politician from West Bengal. He is a member of West Bengal Legislative Assembly, from Rajarhat Gopalpur Assembly constituency. He is a member of Bharatiya Janata Party.

== Early Life ==
He has completed B.A. LLB (Hons) Snehangshu Kantaacharya Institue of Law, Kalyani University in 2010.
