= Dhanekhali Assembly constituency =

Dhanekhali
- Constituency No. 197 for the West Bengal Legislative Assembly
- Interactive Map Outlining Dhanekhali Assembly Constituency

Constituency details
- Country: India
- Region: East India
- State: West Bengal
- District: Hooghly
- Lok Sabha constituency: Hooghly
- Established: 1951
- Total electors: 222,502
- Reservation: SC

Member of Legislative Assembly
- 18th West Bengal Legislative Assembly
- Incumbent Ashima Patra
- Party: Mamata All IndiaTrinamool Congress
- Alliance: Mamata All IndiaTrinamool Congress+
- Elected year: 2026

Dhanekhali Assembly constituency is an assembly constituency in Hooghly district in the Indian state of Bengal. It is reserved for scheduled castes.

== Overview ==
As per orders of the Delimitation Commission, No. 197 Dhanekhali Assembly constituency (SC) is composed of the following: Belmuri, Bhastara, Dashghara I, Dashghara II, Dhaniakhali I, Dhaniakhali II, Gurap, Gurbari I, Gurbari II, Khajurdaha Milki, Mandra, Somaspur I and Somaspur II gram panchayats of Dhaniakhali community development block, and Babnan, Dadpur, Makalpur and Satithan gram panchayats of Polba Dadpur community development block.

Dhanekhali Assembly constituency (SC) is part of No. 28 Hooghly Lok Sabha constituency.

== Members of the Legislative Assembly ==
Year	Name	Party
Dhaniakhali
1951	Dhirendra Narayan Mukherjee	Indian National Congress
1957	Radha Nath Das	Indian National Congress
1957	D. N. Mukherjee	Indian National Congress
1962	Birendra Chaudhury	Indian National Congress
1967	Kripa Sindhu Saha	All India Forward Bloc
1969	Kripa Sindhu Saha	All India Forward Bloc
1971	Kashi Nath Roy	Communist Party of India (Marxist)
1972	Kashi Nath Patra	Indian National Congress
1977	Kripa Sindhu Saha	All India Forward Bloc
1982	Kripa Sindhu Saha	All India Forward Bloc
1987	Kripa Sindhu Saha	All India Forward Bloc
1991	Kripa Sindhu Saha	All India Forward Bloc
1996	Kripa Sindhu Saha	All India Forward Bloc
2001	Kripa Sindhu Saha	All India Forward Bloc
2006	Ajit Patra	All India Forward Bloc
Dhanekhali
2011	Ashima Patra	Trinamool Congress
2016	Ashima Patra	Trinamool Congress
2021	Ashima Patra	Trinamool Congress
2026	Ashima Patra	Trinamool Congress

== Election results ==
=== 2026 ===
2026 West Bengal Legislative Assembly election: Dhanekhali
Party	Candidate	Votes	%	±%
AITC	Ashima Patra	123,462	49.85	▼3.51
BJP	Barnali Das	110,405	44.57	▲4.11
CPI(ML)L	Ruma Ahiri	4,907	1.98	▲0.6
INC	Jyoti Kumari Das	3,358	1.36	▼2.5
NOTA	None of the above	2,896	1.17	▲0.24
Majority		13,057	5.28	▼7.62
Turnout		247,691	94.23	▲8.11
AITC hold		Swing		

=== 2021 ===
2021 West Bengal Legislative Assembly election: Dhanekhali
Party	Candidate	Votes	%	±%
AITC	Ashima Patra	124,776	53.36	▼4.18
BJP	Tushar Kumar Majumdar	94,617	40.46	▲32.96
INC	Anirban Saha	9,033	3.86	New entry
CPI(ML)L	Sajal Kumar De	3,230	1.38	▲0.39
NOTA	None of the above	2,182	0.93	▼0.77
Majority		30,159	12.9	▼14.03
Turnout		233,838	86.12	▼1.02
AITC hold		Swing		

=== 2016 ===
2016 West Bengal Legislative Assembly election: Dhanekhali
Party	Candidate	Votes	%	±%
AITC	Ashima Patra	125,298	57.54	▲6.36
AIFB	Pradip Majumdar	66,654	30.61	▼12.28
BJP	Sasthi Duley	16,338	7.50	▲5.29
NOTA	None of the Above	3,709	1.70	New entry
Independent	Ashish Halder	2,558	1.17	New entry
CPI(ML)L	Sajal Kumar De	1,754	0.81	▼1.37
JDP	Pallab Bag	1,439	0.66	▼0.89
Majority		58,644	26.93	▲18.64
Turnout		2,17,750	87.14	▼1.12
AITC hold		Swing		

=== 2011 ===
2011 West Bengal Legislative Assembly election: Dhanekhali
Party	Candidate	Votes	%	±%
AITC	Ashima Patra	100,529	51.18	
AIFB	Srabani Sarkar	84,252	42.89	
BJP	Kripasindhu Roy	4,334	2.21	
CPI(ML)L	Tarun Bauldas	4,276	2.18	
JDP	Amit Mandal	3,042	1.55	
Majority		16,277	8.29	
Turnout		1,96,433	88.26	
AITC gain from AIFB		Swing		

=== 1977-2006 ===
In the 2006 state assembly elections, Ajit Patra of Forward Bloc won the Dhaniakhali assembly seat defeating Jitendra Nath Sarkar of Trinamool Congress. Contests in most years were multi cornered but only winners and runners are being mentioned. Kripa Sindu Saha of Forward Bloc defeated Asima Patra representing Trinamool Congress in 2001 and Congress in 1996 and 1991, and Kashinath Patra of Congress in 1987, 1982 and 1977.

=== 1952-1972 ===
Kashi Nath Patra of Congress won in 1972. Kashi Nath Roy of CPI(M) won in 1971. Kripa Sindhu Saha of Forward Bloc won in 1969 and 1967. Birendra Chaudhury of Congress won in 1962. In 1957 Dhaniakhali was a double seat. It was won by Radha Nath Das and D.N.Mukherjee, both of Congress. In independent India's first election in 1951 the Dhaniakhali seat was won by Dhirendra Narayan Mukherjee of Congress.
