= Farsara =

Farsara ফরসরা Milanpally
- ward
- Nickname: Phalsara
- Location in West Bengal, India
- Coordinates: 25.83°N 87.91°E
- Country: India
- State: West Bengal
- District: Uttar Dinajpur

Government
  - Councillor: Firoz Ahmed

Population (2010)
  - Total: 5,793

Languages
  - Official: Bengali, English
- Time zone: UTC+5:30 (IST)
- PIN: 733201
- Telephone code: 913525
- ISO 3166 code: IN-WB
- Vehicle registration: W.B 59-60
- Lok Sabha constituency: Dalkhola
- Vidhan Sabha constituency: Dalkhola
- Website: www.dalkholamunicipality.org

Farsara is an area of Dalkhola municipality in Uttar Dinajpur District, West Bengal. It is in Ward No. 16.

== History ==
Farasara lies on the border of Bihar and Bengal. Before 2000, it looked like a village, but by 2010, it had developed into a commercial center.

== Transport ==
A tempo stand was established in 2005. It provides transport to the nearby gram panchayats in Bihar. Here the road's name is NH.34-2. Some time later it will meet to Barsoi in Katihar district.

== Schools ==
These schools are in Farsara:

- Dalkhola Urdu High School (jr)
- Farsara FP School
- Sishu Siksha Mandir
