= Rajarhat Gopalpur Assembly constituency =

Rajarhat Gopalpur
- Constituency No. 117 for the West Bengal Legislative Assembly
- Interactive Map Outlining Rajarhat Gopalpur Assembly Constituency

Constituency details
- Country: India
- Region: East India
- State: West Bengal
- District: North 24 Parganas
- Lok Sabha constituency: Dum Dum
- Established: 1962
- Total electors: 239,551
- Reservation: None

Member of Legislative Assembly
- 18th West Bengal Legislative Assembly
- Incumbent Tarunjyoti Tewari
- Party: BJP
- Alliance: NDA
- Elected year: 2026

Rajarhat-Gopalpur Assembly constituency is a Legislative Assembly constituency of North 24 Parganas district in the Indian state of West Bengal.

== Overview ==
As per orders of the Delimitation Commission, No. 117 Rajarhat-Gopalpur Assembly constituency is composed of the following: Ward Nos. 6-11,15-19,22-26 of Bidhannagar Municipal Corporation (Before 2015 Wards 7-9 & 14-27 of Rajarhat-Gopalpur Municipality) and Ward Nos. 18 and 21-27 of South Dum Dum Municipality.

Rajarhat-Gopalpur Assembly constituency is part of No. 16 Dum Dum (Lok Sabha constituency). Rajarhat (SC) was also part of Dum Dum (Lok Sabha constituency).

== Members of the Legislative Assembly ==
Year	Name	Party
1962	Pranab Prasad Roy	Communist Party of India
1967	S. N. Das	Communist Party of India (Marxist)
1969	Rabindranath Mondal	Communist Party of India (Marxist)
1971	Khagendranath Mondal	Indian National Congress
1972	Khagendranath Mondal	Indian National Congress
1977	Rabindranath Mondal	Communist Party of India (Marxist)
1982	Rabindranath Mondal	Communist Party of India (Marxist)
1987	Rabindranath Mondal	Communist Party of India (Marxist)
1991	Rabindranath Mondal	Communist Party of India (Marxist)
1996	Rabindranath Mondal	Communist Party of India (Marxist)
2001	Tanmoy Mondal	Trinamool Congress
2006	Rabindranath Mondal	Communist Party of India (Marxist)
2011	Purnendu Basu	Trinamool Congress
2016	Purnendu Basu	Trinamool Congress
2021	Aditi Munshi	Trinamool Congress
2026	Tarunjyoti Tewari	Bharatiya Janata Party

== Election results ==
=== 2026 ===
2026 West Bengal Legislative Assembly election: Rajarhat Gopalpur
Party	Candidate	Votes	%	±%
BJP	Tarunjyoti Tewari	101,277	51.74	▲16.85
AITC	Aditi Munshi	73,520	37.56	▼11.48
CPI(M)	Subhajit Dasgupta	16,476	8.42	▼5.29
INC	Partha Bhowmik	1653	0.84	
NOTA	None of the above	1,568	0.8	▼0.46
Majority		27,757	14.18	▲0.03
Turnout		195,730	89.38	▲19.96
BJP gain from AITC		Swing		

=== 2021 ===
West Bengal assembly elections, 2021: Rajarhat Gopalpur
Party	Candidate	Votes	%	±%
AITC	Aditi Munshi	87,650	49.04	
BJP	Samik Bhattacharya	62,354	34.89	▲22.92
CPI(M)	Subhajit Dasgupta	24,511	13.71	▼26.4
NOTA	None of the above	2,258	1.26	
Majority		25,296	14.15	
Turnout		178,723	69.42	
AITC hold		Swing		

=== 2016 ===
2016 West Bengal Legislative Assembly election: Rajarhat Gopalpur
Party	Candidate	Votes	%	±%
AITC	Purnendu Bose	72,793	44.30	−15.46
CPI(M)	Nepaldev Bhattacharya	65,919	40.11	+4.12
BJP	Dilip Mitra	19,683	11.97	+9.42
Independent	Ranjit Kumar Dutta	1,244	0.75	N/A
Independent	Shyamal Mondal	895	0.54	N/A
NOTA	None of the above	3,780	2.30	N/A
Majority		6,874	4.19	−19.58
Turnout		164,314		
AITC hold		Swing		

=== 2011 ===
In the 2011 election, Purnendo Bose of Trinamool Congress defeated his nearest rival Robin Mondal of CPI(M).

West Bengal assembly elections, 2011: Rajarhat Gopalpur constituency
Party	Candidate	Votes	%	±%
AITC	Purnendo Bose	89,829	59.76	
CPI(M)	Rabindranath Mondal	54,104	35.99	
BJP	Manoranjan Das	3,837	2.55	
Independent	Sunil Kumar Paul	785		
Independent	Purnendu Basu	613		
Independent	Jahar Roy	603		
Independent	Abhijit Maity	538		
Majority		35,725	23.77	
Turnout		150,327	78.20	
AITC win (new seat)				

=== 2006 ===
In the 2006 state assembly elections, Rabindranath Mandal of CPI(M) won the Rajarhat (SC) assembly seat defeating Tanmoy Mondal of Trinamool Congress. Contests in most years were multi cornered but only winners and runners are being mentioned. In 2001 Tanmoy Mondal of Trinamool Congress defeated Rabindranath Mandal of CPI(M). Prior to that Rabindranath Mondal had won the seat five times in a row defeating Tanmoy Mondal representing Congress in 1996, Sukumar Roy of Congress in 1991, Biswananda Naskar of Congress in 1987, Tanmoy Mondal of Congress in 1982 and Amalendu Sekhar Naskar of Congress in 1977.

=== 1972 ===
Khagendranath Mondal of Congress won in 1972 and 1971. Rabindranath Mondal of CPI(M) won in 1969. S.N.Das of CPI(M) won in 1967. Pranab Prasad Roy of CPI(M) won in 1962. Prior to that the Rajarhat seat did not exist.
