= Dhruba Saha =

Indian politician

Member of the West Bengal Legislative Assembly
- Incumbent
- Assumed office 2026
- Preceded by: Asish Banerjee
- Constituency: Rampurhat

Personal details
- Party: Bharatiya Janata Party
- Profession: Politician

Dhruba Saha is an Indian politician from West Bengal. He is a member of the West Bengal Legislative Assembly representing Rampurhat as a member of the Bharatiya Janata Party.

Dhruba Saha was born in Banior Village of Nalhati -1 block, Birbhum district. He graduated from Sainthia Abhedananda Mahavidyalaya. Dhruba Saha joined ABVP during his student life. He was a State Vice President of BJYM West Bengal. He was District President of BJP Birbhum Organisational District. Now he is an MLA from the Rampurhat assembly.

== Political career ==
Saha won the Rampurhat seat in the 2026 West Bengal Legislative Assembly election as a candidate of the Bharatiya Janata Party. He received 1,11,920 votes and defeated Asish Banerjee of the All India Trinamool Congress by a margin of 24,233 votes.
