= Department of Law (West Bengal) =

State government department in West Bengal, India

Department overview
- Jurisdiction: Government of West Bengal
- Headquarters: Writers' Building
- Minister responsible: Biraj Biswas, Minister of State
- Department executive: Pradip Kumar Panja, Principal Secretary
- Website: Official Website

Department of Law is a department under the Government of West Bengal in West Bengal, India. This is the main legal policy making and advisory authority of State Government.

== History ==
Initially the works of Legal policy making and legislative drafting were entrusted to the Legislative Department of the Government of West Bengal. The Department of Law was established in March 1958 after amalgamation of Legislative and Judicial Department of the State government. This were also sub divided into Judicial and Legislative in 1963. In 1988, the Legislative Department was renamed as the Law Department with effect from 1 March 1988. The headquarters of this Department situated in the main block, Writers' Building, Kolkata.

== Activities ==
The Department has two branches, the Legislative Branch and the Official Language Branch. The Law Department is assigned with the legislative drafting, publication of notifications, Bills, Ordinances and amendments to Bill and Acts, rules and by-laws through official gazettes of the other administrative Departments of the West Bengal. It also performs periodical revision, correction of orders, settlement of Statutory notifications, regulations whenever necessary. Further this Department deputes West Bengal Legal Service officers in various departments to look after the court cases concerned.

== Ministers ==
Presently the Minister-of State is Biraj Biswas. Previously Moloy Ghatak, leader of the All India Trinamool Congress was the Minister in-charge.
