= Aditi Munshi =

Indian singer and politician

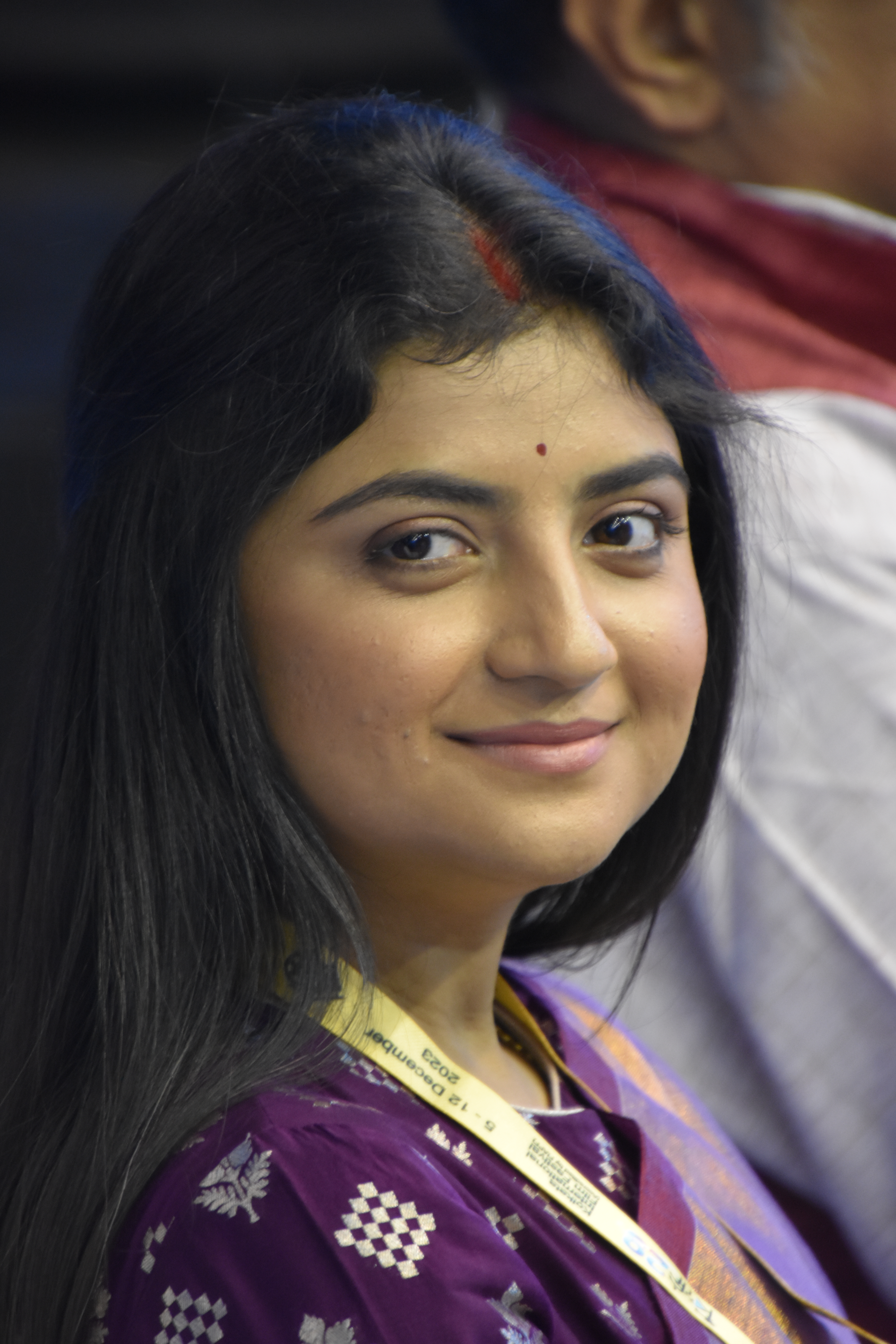

Member of West Bengal Legislative Assembly
- In office 2 May 2021 – 4 May 2026
- Preceded by: Purnendu Basu
- Succeeded by: Tarunjyoti Tewari
- Constituency: Rajarhat Gopalpur

Personal details
- Born: 26 August 1988 (age 38) Baguihati, Kolkata, West Bengal, India
- Party: Trinamool Congress (2021–present)
- Spouse: Debraj Chakraborty (m. 2018)
- Musical career
- Occupations: Singer, Songwriter, Vocal Artist, Actress, Politician
- Works: Shri Krishno Kirton (2020); Bhorer Shishir (2021); Laxmi Panchali (2022); Natobor Ke Go (2023); Boni Abhishare (2023); Anandini Maa (2023); Bosonto Ronge (2024); Debi Bhagabati (2024); Shib Bandana (2024); He Mahapran (2024); Playback: Krishnakoli (2018), Gotro (2019) .
- Label: Baro Gaane Borsho Japon

Aditi Munshi (born 26 August 1988) is an Indian singer and politician from West Bengal. She is known for singing many Hindu devotional songs in Bengali. She was also a participant of Zee Bangla's Sa Re Ga Ma Pa 2015. She won from Rajarhat Gopalpur in 2021 West Bengal assembly election as a candidate of Trinamool Congress.

== Early life and musical foundation ==
Aditi Munshi was born on 26 August 1988 in a Bengali family, in the household of Manindra Munshi and Mitali Munshi in the Dakshinpara locality of Baguihati, Kolkata. Raised in a home steeped in the traditions of puratoni music, Aditi's upbringing was filled with the daily practice of Kirtan during the worship rituals dedicated to the family deities. This environment fostered her deep connection to devotional music from a very young age. The daily recitals of devotional songs under her mother's supervision and her father's inspiration laid the foundation for Aditi's musical journey. As she grew older, her dedication to artistic practice merged seamlessly with her devotion to her muse, leading her to embody the very essence of the Kirtans she performed.

== Musical training and education ==
Aditi's initial vocal training was provided by her parents. As she matured, she received further guidance from Shubrakanto Chatterjee and Snehashish Chatterjee. Her quest for mastery in Kirtan and puratoni music led her to study under Shrimati Kankana Mitra, Shrimati Saraswati Das, and Timir Baran Bhattacharya. Recognizing the dual role of Kirtan performers as both singers and percussionists, Aditi trained in Tabla under Dhruba Biswas and Shri Khol under Gautam Bhattacharya. She formalised her education by completing a bachelor's degree in Performative Art in Kirtan from Rabindra Bharati University. Throughout her training, she was blessed with the mentorship of deeply spiritual individuals, which is often reflected in her performances.

== Career and achievements ==
Aditi's career took off with her first performance at the All India Merit Contest in 2010, where she was recognised by the Governor of Bengal, M.K. Narayanan, for her evocative style. In 2012, she was acknowledged as a Sangeet Shilpi by Akashvani. Her international breakthrough came in 2015 through Zee Bangla Sa-Re-Ga-Ma-Pa, where she was hailed as the "Queen of Kirtans." In 2016, she received the Sangeet Samman award from the Chief Minister of Bengal. Her growing popularity led to her being chosen as a brand ambassador for the Chattagram Bagishik Geet Sansad. In 2018, she was honoured as Kirtan Samragee by the Shree Chaitanya Institute of Vaishnavite Culture. In 2020, she was nominated for the Emerging Female Vocalist in Bengali category and received the title from Mirchi Music Awards.

== Playback singing and contemporary contributions ==
Aditi's talent extended beyond live performances into playback singing for contemporary Bengali cinema and TV serials. Her notable works include playback performances in films such as Tushangni, Gotra, Kathamrita, and Bismillah. The music album for Bismillah, directed by Indradeep Dasgupta, was nominated for a Filmfare Award in 2022. Her songs have a profound effect on her audience, often leading them to sway with their arms raised in the spiritual rhythm of Haribol.

== Sangitam: Aditi’s dream project ==
Sangitam is Aditi's visionary project aimed at creating a space where individuals of all ages can come together to immerse themselves in music. The Sangitam Music House focuses on producing and publishing music albums, while the Sangitam Cultural Academy, initiated in 2022 under the guidance of Pandit Ajoy Chakravarty, aims to train young talents. This academy provides comprehensive musical training, enabling trainees to explore and establish themselves in various branches and disciplines of music.

Aditi grew up in a musically active household and later established a career as a performer and educator.

Her contributions to Kirtan and puratoni music continue to inspire and resonate with audiences around the world.

== Political career ==
Munshi joined Trinamool Congress ahead of 2021 West Bengal Legislative Assembly election. She got a ticket from Rajarhat Gopalpur Assembly constituency of West Bengal. She secured 87,650 votes about 49% of total vote share, defeating her nearest rival, Samik Bhattacharya of Bharatiya Janata Party by a margin of 25,296 votes.

== Controversy ==
Her husband Debraj Chakraborty was arrested by the West Bengal Police in relation to a disproportionate assets case registered against him. A single judge bench of the Calcutta High Court granted an interim anticipatory bail to her, a co-accused in the same disproportionate assets case.
