= Goutam Paul =

Indian politician

Goutam Paul is an Indian politician who is serving as Member of 17th West Bengal Assembly from Karandighi Assembly constituency. He is from All India Trinamool Congress. He won securing 116,594 votes, defeating his nearest rival, Subhas Chandra Sinha of BJP.
