= Dalkhola Municipality =

Type
- Type: Municipality

History
- Founded: 2003; 22 years ago

Leadership
- Chairman: Swadesh Sarkar, AITC
- Vice Chairman: Haji Firoz Ahmed, AITC
- Executive officer: Arikul Islam

Structure
- Seats: 16
- Political groups: Government (12): AITC (12); Opposition (4): IND (4)

Elections
- Last election: 2022
- Next election: 2027

Dalkhola Municipality or DM was established in the year 2003 and has been responsible for the civic infrastructure and administration of the city of Dalkhola.

== Geography ==
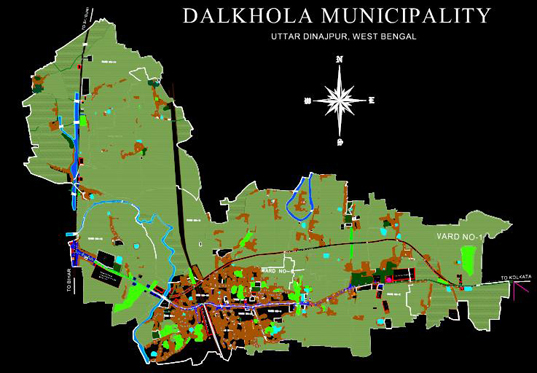
Map of Dalkhola Municipality

Dalkhola Municipality is located at 25°51′N 87°51′E

== Councillors ==
| Ward Number | Councillor's Name | Area Covered |
|---|---|---|
| 1 | Ali Hussain | 1.92 |
| 2 | Shyamali das adhikary | 1.06 |
| 3 | Sujana das | 1.45 |
| 4 | Tanay dey | 1.04 |
| 5 | Kailash saha | 0.24 |
| 6 | Renu Devi Bohanaia | 0.31 |
| 7 | Moumita barman | 0.24 |
| 8 | Swadesh Ch Sarkar | 0.23 |
| 9 | Iti Karn | 0.81 |
| 10 | Rakesh sarkar | 0.28 |
| 11 | Gopal Ray | 2.28 |
| 12 | Tahsina Khatun | 1.63 |
| 13 | Anzar Alam | 1.92 |
| 14 | Ali Raza Khan | 2.27 |
| 15 | Tabassum khatun | 1.82 |
| 16 | Haji firoj Ahmad | 2.17 |

== Departments ==
| Name of the Department | Work / Activities |
|---|---|
| Education & Culture | Maintenance Charges of SC / ST Students of Dalkhola; Mid-day-Meal Programme.; Felicitation programme for meritorious students of Madhyamik & Higher Secondary Exam. |
| Assessment & Mutation | Correction of Mutation; Assessment(Issue of new holding number); Vacant Land Land with building Property on Railway land/Vest land |
| Electricity | Maintenance and Development of Street Light and Project Work with in Dalkhola Area. |
| Public Works Department | Repairing and widening of roads.; Construction of drains and roads. |
| Accounts | Carry out account activity of Corporation.; Handling of treasure |
| General | All types of computer related works and maintaining all types of files and records..; Maintaining telephone/mobile register of Councillors and to dispatch Govt. letters to Chairman/Vice Chairman/Executive officer/Secretary. |
| Birth and Death | Issue of Birth & Death Certificate; Maintain of Vital Statistics by Age, Sex & Religion. |
| Trade Licence | Issuance & Renewal of Certificate of Enlistment.; Advertisement related works.; Cycle Rickshaw & Cycle Rickshaw Van related works. |
| Building | Approval of the building plan. |
| U.P.E. Section | Slum Improvement. |
| Water Supply | Registration of water supply connection house and commercial establishment. |
| Estlablishment | Pension Matter and Staff salary. |
| Public Health and Hospital | Regular immunization program.; Health check-up.; Awareness program on vector-borne diseases like Malaria, Dengue and Encephalitis.; Prevent prenatal sex determination of foetus and to maintain the sex ratio between male & female. |
| Vehicle | Manages and control vehicle carrying water tank and garbage. |
| Market | Improvement of commercial establishment. |
| Conservancy Section | Collection and disposal of garbage. |
| Tax | Property tax collection. |
| Cash Section | Parking Fee and Site Planning Fee. |
| Law Section | To look after various day to day court cases of DM and give legal opinion if needed. |
| Sports | Co-ordanating sports activities and events organised by DM. |
| Guest House Booking Cell | Looks after bookings of guest house owned by DM. |
