= Department of Labour (West Bengal) =

State government department in West Bengal, India

Department overview
- Jurisdiction: Government of West Bengal
- Headquarters: New Secretariat Building Block A 12thFloor, 1 KS roy Road Kolkata 700001
- Minister responsible: Arjun Singh , Cabinet Minister
- Deputy Minister responsible: Bhaskar Bhattacharya , MoS
- Department executive: Avanindra Singh, IAS, Secretary
- Website: labour.wb.gov.in

The Department of Labour is a West Bengal government department. It is an interior ministry mainly responsible for the administration of the development of labours.

== List of Ministers ==
- Arjun Singh , Cabinet Minister [From 10 June 2026]
- Bhaskar Bhattacharya , MoS [From 10 June 2026]
- Shri Moloy Ghatak [Till 07 May 2026]
- Becharam Manna (MoS I/C) [Till 2026]
- Jakir Hossain (MoS) [Till 2021]
- Nirmal Maji (MoS)
- Md. Ghulam Rabbani (MoS)

== Introduction ==
The Department of Labour, Government of West Bengal, is responsible for the development of labours in the state of West Bengal. This Department of West Bengal aims at enhancing the quality of life of workers by providing social security, creating an environment that is conducive for investments in the State and at adherence to Acts and Rules that promote productive industrial relations. Regulatory parameters have been considerably reformed under the Ease of Doing Business in West Bengal. The department is steadfast in its endeavour towards making the delivery of services user-friendly and completely online by 2018. The core functions of the department are enforcing labour regulatory mechanism, welfare of West Bengal labours and enforcing state and national labour laws and regulations.

== Branches and Cells of the Department ==
- General Establishment Branch
- Labour Welfare Branch
- Social Security Branch
- Law Cell
- Issue Cell
- Employment Cell
- Industrial Relation Cell

== Organizations under the Department ==
- Labour Commissionerate
- Directorate of Employment
- Directorate of Factories
- Directorate of Boilers
- Directorate Of ESI (MB) Scheme
- Directorate OF Tea
- State Labour Institute
- West Bengal Labour Welfare Boards (Kolkata and Siliguri)
- Directorate Of Employees' Compensation (HQ, Burdwan Area, Jalpaiguri Area)
- Directorate of Industrial Tribunals and Labour Courts
  - Kolkata- 1st, 2nd, 3rd, 4th, 5th, 7th and 8th Tribunals
  - Jalpaiguri-6th Tribunal
  - Durgapur-9th Tribunal

== Schemes and Projects ==
- Ease of Doing Business (EoDB) initiative,
- e-District
- Yuvasree
- Bina Mulye Samajik Suraksha Yojana (BM-SSY)
- West Bengal Migrant Workers' Welfare Scheme ( Karmasathi-Parijayee Shramik)
