= Bhaskar Bhattacharya (politician) =

Indian politician (born 1958)

Minister of State, Government of West Bengal
- Incumbent
- Assumed office 1 June 2026
- Governor: R. N. Ravi
- Chief Minister: Suvendu Adhikari
- Department: Department of Public Health *Department of Labour

Member of the West Bengal Legislative Assembly
- Incumbent
- Assumed office 4 May 2026
- Preceded by: Sudipto Roy
- Constituency: Sreerampur

Personal details
- Party: Bharatiya Janata Party

Bhaskar Bhattacharya (born 1958) is an Indian politician from West Bengal. He is a member of the West Bengal Legislative Assembly from the Sreerampur Assembly constituency in Hooghly district representing the Bharatiya Janata Party.

== Early life and education ==
Bhattacharya is from Sreerampur, Hooghly district, West Bengal. He is the son of the late Shib Sankar Bhattacharya. He completed his B.Com (honours) at Serampore College and LLB at Surendra Nath Law College in 1985. Later, he did a Post Graduate Diploma in Business Management at Institute of Business Management and Research, Kolkata in 1987. He is an advocate. He declared assets worth Rs.1 crore in his affidavit to the Election Commission of India.

== Career ==
Bhattacharya won the Sreerampur Assembly constituency representing the Bharatiya Janata Party in the 2026 West Bengal Legislative Assembly election. He polled 85,644 votes and defeated his nearest rival, Tanmoy Ghosh of the All India Trinamool Congress by a margin of 8,685 votes. Earlier, he contested and lost the 2016 West Bengal Legislative Assembly election from the same constituency on the BJP ticket. In 2016, he polled 24,059 votes and finished third behind winner Sudipto Roy of the Trinamool Congress and Subhankar Sarkar of the Indian National Congress, who finished second placed. He first contested on the BJP ticket and could finish only fourth in the 2009 by election to Sreerampur seat, that was won by Sudipto Roy.
