= Moloy Ghatak =

Indian politician (born 1956)

Minister of Law and Minister for Public Works Government of West Bengal
- In office July 2014 - 8 May 2026 (in Law); 10 May 2021 - 8 May 2026 (in Public Work) – 8 May 2026
- Preceded by: Chandrima Bhattacharya (from Law); Aroop Biswas (from Public Work)
- Succeeded by: Biraj Biswas (MoS); Ajay Kumar Poddar

Minister for Labour Government of West Bengal
- In office July 2014 – 2021
- Preceded by: Purnendo Bose
- Succeeded by: Becharam Manna (as MoS I/C)

Minister for Agriculture Government of West Bengal
- In office November 2012 – May, 2014
- Preceded by: Rabindranath Bhattacharjee
- Succeeded by: Purnendo Bose

Member of the West Bengal Legislative Assembly
- In office May 13, 2011 - May 4, 2026; 2001 - 2006 – 8 May 2026
- Preceded by: New seat (Asansol Uttar); Amitava Mukhopadhyay (Hirapur)
- Succeeded by: Tapas Banerjee (Hirapur)
- Constituency: Asansol Uttar (May 13, 2011 - May 4, 2026); Hirapur (2001 - 2006)

Personal details
- Born: 1956 (age 69–70) Ukhra
- Party: Trinamool Congress
- Spouse: Sudeshna Ghatak
- Children: Avik Ghatak
- Education: University of Calcutta

Moloy Ghatak is an Indian politician formerly serving as a Cabinet Minister in Government of West Bengal.

== Early life ==
Ghatak hails from Asansol, Paschim Bardhaman district. His father's name is Phani Bhusan Ghatak. He did his graduation with Political Science honours from Ananda Chandra College, Jalpaiguri and LL.B from Calcutta University in 1982.

== Politics ==
He is an MLA of All India Trinamool Congress, elected from the Asansol Uttar constituency of Paschim Bardhaman district in the 2011, 2016 and 2021 West Bengal state assembly election and had previously been an MLA from Hirapur constituency in 2001–2006. He played an instrumental role in bringing about the creation of the new Paschim Bardhaman District, which is the 23rd district of West Bengal, with its headquarters at Asansol.

== Legal career ==
He is an Advocate by profession and usually practiced criminal law at Asansol Court. He is a third generation advocate.

Political offices
Preceded by	Minister of Labour in the West Bengal Government; 2014 –	Succeeded by
Preceded by	Minister for Law in the West Bengal Government; 2014 –	Succeeded by
State Legislative Assembly
Preceded by predecessor	Member of the West Bengal Legislative Assembly from Hirapur Assembly constituency 2001–2006	Seat abolished
New seat	Member of the West Bengal Legislative Assembly from Asansol Uttar Assembly constituency 2011–	Succeeded by successor
