= Prabuddha Laha =

Indian politician and advocate

Prabuddha Laha (14 December 1950 – 7 September 2004) was an advocate and politician from West Bengal, India. He represented the Indian National Congress from the Asansol constituency in the West Bengal Legislative Assembly from 1987 to 1991.
