= Department of Fisheries (West Bengal) =

State government department in West Bengal, India

Department overview
- Jurisdiction: Government of West Bengal
- Headquarters: BENFISH TOWER, 8th floor, 31 GN Block, Salt Lake, Sector V, Kolkata – 700091
- Minister responsible: Rajesh Mahata [Minister of State (Independent Charge)]
- Department executive: Smt. Roshni Sen IAS, Secretary
- Website: Official Website

The Department of Fisheries is a ministerial office jurisdicted by Government of West Bengal.

== Ministerial Team ==
This department is mainly used:

- To increase fish production by optimum utilization of all water bodies.
- To create infrastructure for harvest management.
- To develop for enabling eco-system for adoption of scientific pisci-culture.
- To strive for socio-economic uplift of the fishermen at large mass.
- To ensure availability of fish at affordable cost to the masses.
