= 1987 West Bengal Legislative Assembly election =

Assembly elections in West Bengal

- 29 March 1987

All 294 seats in the West Bengal Legislative Assembly 148 seats needed for a majority
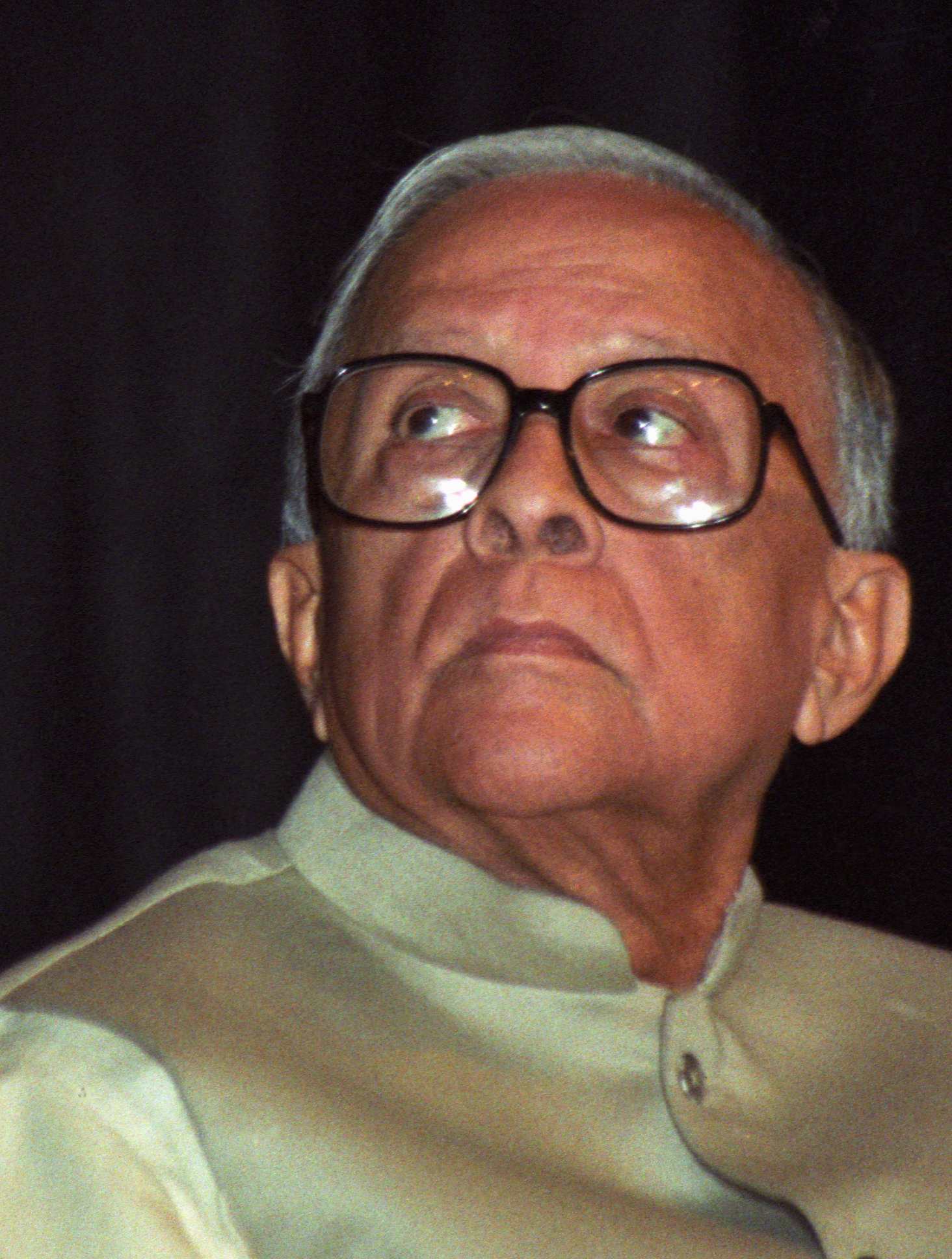

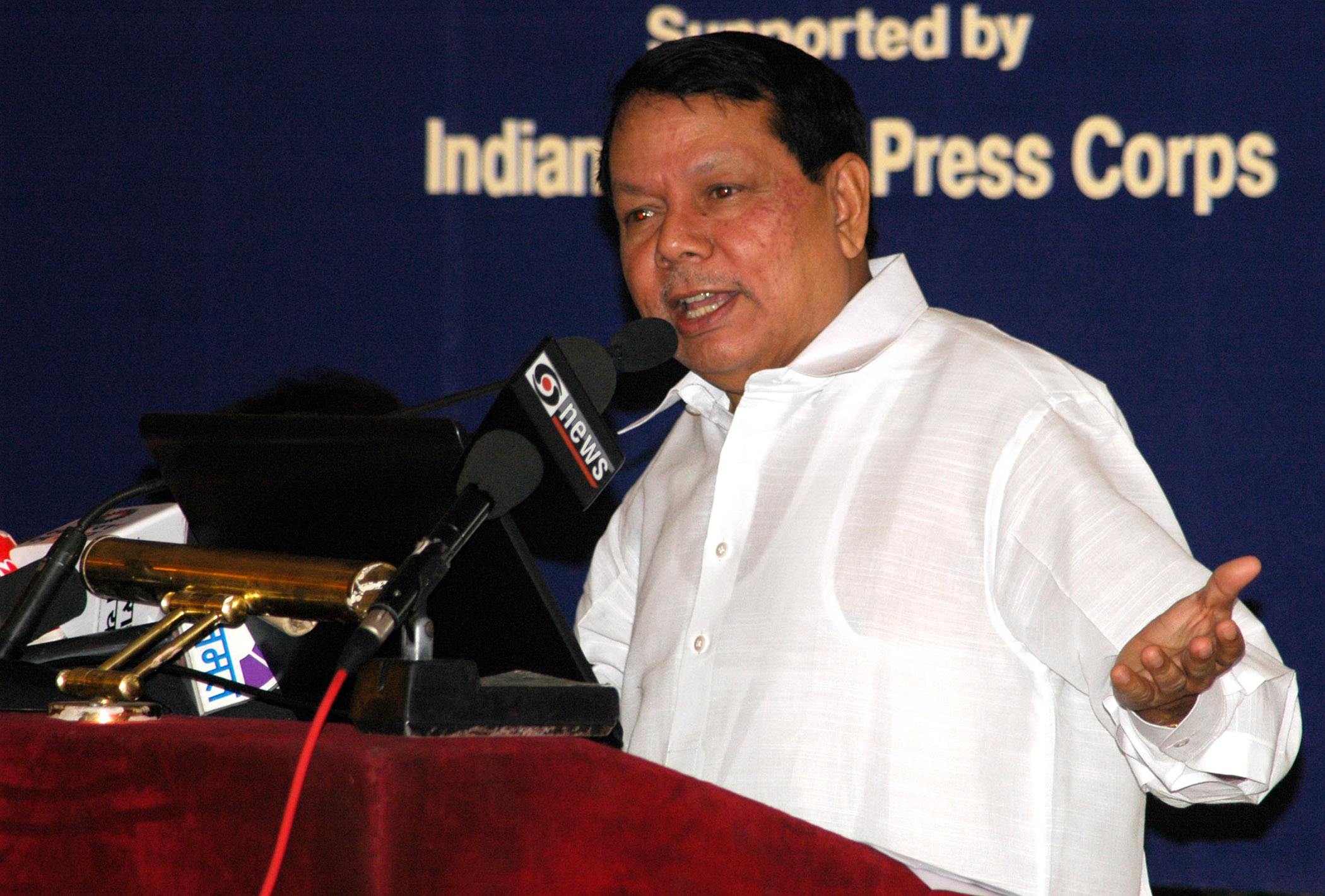
	First party	Second party
Leader	Jyoti Basu	Priya Ranjan Dasmunsi
Party	CPI(M)	INC(I)
Alliance	LF
Leader since	1964	1987
Leader's seat	Satgachhia	Did not contest (Note: Dasmunshi was the sitting MP from Howrah.)
Last election	38.49%, 174 seats	35.73%, 49 seats
Seats won	187	40
Seat change	▲13	▼9
Popular vote	10,327,984	10,989,520
Percentage	39.3%	41.81%
Swing	▲0.89 pp	▲6.08 pp
Alliance seats	251	40
Seat change	▲13	▼9
- Alliance wise Result
Chief Minister before election
Jyoti Basu
CPI(M)
Chief Minister after election
Jyoti Basu
CPI(M)

Legislative Assembly elections were held in the Indian state of West Bengal in 1987. The election was mainly a clash between the Left Front led by Chief Minister Jyoti Basu and the Indian National Congress(I) led by Prime Minister Rajiv Gandhi. The former held the state government and the latter the national government. The election was won by the Left Front, for the third time in a row.

== Contestants ==
=== Left Front ===
The governing Left Front denied tickets to 62 sitting legislators. In many cases CPI(M), the dominant force in the Left Front, was seeking to rejuvenate the legislature and fielded 35 student leaders as new candidates.

The star campaigner of the Left Front was Chief Minister Jyoti Basu of CPI(M), who had pledged to visit all constituencies where CPI(M) had fielded candidates. During the campaign Basu claimed that the Delhi government discriminated against West Bengal in allocation of resources.

=== Congress(I) ===
'Natun Bangla' ('New Bengal') was the key slogan of the Congress(I) campaign. The star campaigner of Congress(I) was Prime Minister Rajiv Gandhi, who was flown in from Delhi and toured the state. At the time Gandhi enjoyed significant popularity, especially amongst urban upper-middle class sectors. Gandhi was accompanied by West Bengal Congress(I) chief Priya Ranjan Dasmunsi on the campaign trail. Striking a populist tone in midst of deindustrialisation in the state caused by militant activism of Communist labour unions, Gandhi promised development in West Bengal and to create a million new jobs.

The Congress(I) campaign, whilst being boosted by Gandhi, suffered from internal dissent in party ranks. The state Congress cadre were divided into the pro-Rajiv Gandhi camp, led by A. B. A. Ghani Khan Choudhury and the anti-Rajiv Gandhi camp led by Pranab Mukherjee, who saw not Rajiv but himself as the bonafide successor of Indira Gandhi's political legacy. Feeling sidelined by Rajiv, who dropped him from the Union Cabinet after the 1984 general elections, Mukherjee broke away from the Congress (Indira) in 1986 to found his own party, the Rashtriya Samajwadi Congress. In protest of Mukherjee's exit, his supporters within the Congress(I), notably Subrata Mukherjee & Somen Mitra refused to co-operate with the top leadership.

== Gorkhaland issue ==
Whilst an accord had been struck between Gandhi and Gorkha National Liberation Front leader Subhash Ghisingh ahead of the polls, violence escalated in the Darjeeling hills. In the run-up to the polls, several policemen were killed in the area.

== Seat Allotment ==
=== Left Front ===
Party	Flag	Symbol	Leader	Contesting Seats	
Communist Party of India (Marxist)			Jyoti Basu	212	220
Revolutionary Communist Party of India			Baneswar Saikia	3	220
Democratic Socialist Party			Prabodh Chandra Sinha	2	220
Marxist Forward Bloc			Pratim Chatterjee	2	220
Biplobi Bangla Congress				1	220
All India Forward Bloc			Chitta Basu	34	
Revolutionary Socialist Party			Tridib Chaudhuri	23	
Communist Party of India			Chandra Rajeswara Rao	12	
West Bengal Socialist Party			Kiranmoy Nanda	5	
Total				294	

=== Indira Congress ===
Party	Flag	Symbol	Leader	Contesting Seats
Indian National Congress (Indira)			Priya Ranjan Dasmunsi	294
Total				294

=== Others ===
Party	Flag	Symbol	Leader	Contesting Seats
Bharatiya Janata Party			Lal Krishna Advani	57
Socialist Unity Centre of India (Communist)			Nihar Mukherjee	46
Indian Union Muslim League			Ebrahim Sulaiman Sait	36
Janata Party			Chandra Shekhar	30
Lok Dal			Subramanian Swamy	18
Indian Congress (Socialist-Sarat Chandra Sinha)			Sarat Chandra Sinha	4

== Results ==
The Left Front won 251 out of 294 seats. It obtained 13,918,403 votes (52.96% of the statewide vote).

Party		Candidates	Seats	Votes	%
Left Front	Communist Party of India (Marxist)	212	187	10,285,723	39.12
Left Front	All India Forward Bloc	34	26	1,534,795	5.84
Left Front	Revolutionary Socialist Party	23	18	1,036,138	3.94
Left Front	Communist Party of India	12	11	503,854	1.92
Left Front	Revolutionary Communist Party of India	3	1	118,985	0.42
Left Front	Marxist Forward Bloc	2	2	107,732	0.41
Left Front	Biplobi Bangla Congress	1	0	42,261	0.16
Left Front	West Bengal Socialist Party and Democratic Socialist Party (Prabodh Chandra)	7	6	288,915	1.10
Indian National Congress (I)		294	40	10,989,520	41.81
Socialist Unity Centre of India		46	2	237,674	0.90
Indian Union Muslim League		36	1	162,850	0.62
Bharatiya Janata Party		57	0	134,867	0.51
Janata Party		30	0	41,475	0.16
Lok Dal		18	0	10,032	0.04
Indian Congress (Socialist-Sarat Chandra Sinha)		4	0	3,335	0.01
Independents		718	0	784,937	2.99
Total		1,497	294	26,283,093	100
Source: Election Commission of India

It was the last time till date that the Indian National Congress contested without being in any alliance in West Bengal's state elections.

== Elected members ==
Constituency	Reserved for (SC/ST/None)	Member	Party
Mekliganj	SC	Sada Kanta	All India Forward Bloc
Sitalkuchi	SC	Sudhir Pramanik	Communist Party of India (Marxist)
Mathabhanga	SC	Dinesh Chandra Dakua	Communist Party of India (Marxist)
Cooch Behar North	None	Aparajita Goppi	All India Forward Bloc
Cooch Behar West	None	Bimal Kanti Basu	All India Forward Bloc
Sitai	None	Dipak Sen Gupta	All India Forward Bloc
Dinhata	None	Kamal Guha	All India Forward Bloc
Natabari	None	Sibendra Narayan Chowdhury	Communist Party of India (Marxist)
Tufanganj	SC	Manindra Nath Barma	Communist Party of India (Marxist)
Kumargram	ST	Subodh Barwa	Revolutionary Socialist Party
Kalchini	ST	Khudiram Pahan	Indian National Congress
Alipurduars	None	Nani Bhattacharya	Revolutionary Socialist Party
Falakata	SC	Jagendra Nath Singha Roy	Communist Party of India (Marxist)
Madarihat	ST	Sushil Kujur	Revolutionary Socialist Party
Dhupguri	SC	Banamali Roy	Communist Party of India (Marxist)
Nagrakata	ST	Sukra Oraon	Communist Party of India (Marxist)
Mainaguri	SC	Tarak Bandhu Roy	Revolutionary Socialist Party
Mal	ST	Mohanlal Oraon	Communist Party of India (Marxist)
Kranti	None	Sudhan Raha	Communist Party of India (Marxist)
Jalpaiguri	None	Nirmal Kumar Bose	All India Forward Bloc
Rajganj	SC	Dhirendra Nath Roy	Communist Party of India (Marxist)
Kalimpong	None	Mohansing Rai	Communist Party of India
Darjeeling	None	Dawa Lama	Communist Party of India (Marxist)
Kurseong	None	Harka Bahadur Rai	Communist Party of India (Marxist)
Siliguri	None	Gour Chakroborty	Communist Party of India (Marxist)
Phansidewa	ST	Prakash Minj	Communist Party of India (Marxist)
Chopra	None	Mahamudin	Communist Party of India (Marxist)
Islampur	None	Md. Faruque Azam	Communist Party of India (Marxist)
Goalpokhar	None	Mohammad Ranjan Ali	All India Forward Bloc
Karandighi	None	Suresh Chandra Singha	All India Forward Bloc
Raiganj	SC	Khagendra Nath Sinha	Communist Party of India (Marxist)
Kaliaganj	SC	Ramani Kanta Deb Sarma	Communist Party of India (Marxist)
Kushmandi	SC	Roy Narmada	Revolutionary Socialist Party
Itahar	None	Swadesh Chaki	Communist Party of India
Gangarampur	None	Minati Ghosh	Communist Party of India (Marxist)
Tapan	ST	Khara Soren	Revolutionary Socialist Party
Kumarganj	None	Dwijendra Mondal	Communist Party of India (Marxist)
Balurghat	None	Biswanath Choudhury	Revolutionary Socialist Party
Habibpur	ST	Sarkar Murmu	Communist Party of India (Marxist)
Gajol	ST	Suphal Murmu	Communist Party of India (Marxist)
Kharba	None	Nazmul Hoque	Communist Party of India (Marxist)
Harishchandrapur	None	Birendra Kumar Mitra	All India Forward Bloc
Ratua	None	Mumtaz Begum	Communist Party of India (Marxist)
Araidanga	None	Habib Mustafa	Communist Party of India (Marxist)
Malda	SC	Subhendu Chowdhury	Communist Party of India (Marxist)
Englishbazar	None	Sailen Sarkar	Communist Party of India (Marxist)
Manikchak	None	Subodh Chowdhuari	Communist Party of India
Suzapur	None	Humayoun Chowdhury	Indian National Congress
Kaliachak	None	Dinesh Joardar	Communist Party of India (Marxist)
Farakka	None	Abul Hasnat Khan	Communist Party of India (Marxist)
Aurangabad	None	Touab Ali	Communist Party of India (Marxist)
Suti	None	Shish Mohammad	Revolutionary Socialist Party
Sagardighi	SC	Paresh Nath Das	Communist Party of India (Marxist)
Jangipur	None	Habibur Rahaman	Indian National Congress
Lalgola	None	Abdus Sattar	Indian National Congress
Bhagabangola	None	Syed Nawab Jani Meerja	Independent
Nabagram	None	Birendra Narayan Roy	Communist Party of India (Marxist)
Murshidabad	None	Mannan Hossain	Indian National Congress
Jalangi	None	Atahar Rahaman	Communist Party of India (Marxist)
Domkal	None	Abdul Bari Mahammad	Communist Party of India (Marxist)
Naoda	None	Jayanta Kumar Biswas	Revolutionary Socialist Party
Hariharpara	None	Mozammel Hoque	Communist Party of India (Marxist)
Berhampore	None	Debabrata Bandapadhyay	Revolutionary Socialist Party
Beldanga	None	Nurul Islam Choudhury	Indian National Congress
Kandi	None	Syed Wahed Reza	Communist Party of India
Khargram	SC	Bishwanath Mandal	Communist Party of India (Marxist)
Barwan	None	Amalendra Roy	Revolutionary Socialist Party
Bharatpur	None	Satya Pada Bhattacharyya	Revolutionary Socialist Party
Karimpur	None	Biswas Chittaranjan(anandapally)	Communist Party of India (Marxist)
Palashipara	None	Madhabendu Mohanta	Communist Party of India (Marxist)
Nakashipara	None	Sinha Santosh Kumar	Communist Party of India (Marxist)
Kaliganj	None	S.m. Fazlur Rahaman	Indian National Congress
Chapra	None	Mir Qusem	Communist Party of India (Marxist)
Krishnaganj	SC	Nayan Chandra Sarkar	Communist Party of India (Marxist)
Krishnagar East	None	Sadhan Chattopadhyay	Communist Party of India (Marxist)
Krishnagar West	None	Amritendu Mukhopadhyay	Communist Party of India (Marxist)
Nabadwip	None	Biswanath Mitra	Communist Party of India (Marxist)
Santipur	None	Bimalananda Mukherjee	Independent
Hanskhali	SC	Sukumar Mandal	Communist Party of India (Marxist)
Ranaghat East	SC	Binay Krishna Biswas	Communist Party of India (Marxist)
Ranaghat West	None	Gourchandra Kundu	Communist Party of India (Marxist)
Chakdaha	None	Subhash Basu	Communist Party of India (Marxist)
Haringhata	None	Nani Gopal Malakar	Communist Party of India (Marxist)
Bagdaha	SC	Apurba Lal Majumdar	Indian National Congress
Bongaon	None	Ranjit Mitra	Communist Party of India (Marxist)
Gaighata	None	Kanti Biswas	Communist Party of India (Marxist)
Habra	None	Kamal Sen Gupta (bose)	Communist Party of India (Marxist)
Ashokenagar	None	Nani Kar	Communist Party of India (Marxist)
Amdanga	None	Hashim Abdul Halim	Communist Party of India (Marxist)
Barasat	None	Saral Ded	All India Forward Bloc
Rajarhat	SC	Rabindar Nath Mandal	Communist Party of India (Marxist)
Deganga	None	A.k.m.uzzaman	Indian Union Muslim League
Swarupnagar	None	Anisur Biswas	Communist Party of India (Marxist)
Baduria	None	Md. Shelim	Communist Party of India (Marxist)
Basirhat	None	Narayan Mukherjee	Communist Party of India (Marxist)
Hasnabad	None	Goutam Deb	Communist Party of India (Marxist)
Haroa	SC	Kshiti Ranjan Mondal	Communist Party of India (Marxist)
Sandeshkhali	SC	Kumud Ranjan Biswas	Communist Party of India (Marxist)
Hingalganj	SC	Sudhanshu Mondal	Communist Party of India (Marxist)
Gosaba	SC	Ganesh Chandra Mondal	Revolutionary Socialist Party
Basanti	SC	Subhas Naskar	Revolutionary Socialist Party
Kultali	SC	Prabodh Purkait	Socialist Unity Centre of India
Joynagar	None	Deba Prasad Sarkar	Socialist Unity Centre of India
Baruipur	None	Hemen Mojumdar	Communist Party of India (Marxist)
Canning West	SC	Gobinda Chandra Naskar	Indian National Congress
Canning East	None	Abdur Razzak Molla	Communist Party of India (Marxist)
Bhangar	None	Abdur Razzak Molla	Communist Party of India (Marxist)
Jadavpur	None	Buddhadeb Bhattacharjee	Communist Party of India (Marxist)
Sonarpur	SC	Bhadreswar Mondal	Communist Party of India (Marxist)
Bishnupur East	SC	Sundar Naskar	Communist Party of India (Marxist)
Bishnupur West	None	Kashi Nath Adak	Communist Party of India (Marxist)
Behala East	None	Niranjan Mukherjee	Communist Party of India (Marxist)
Behala West	None	Rabin Mukherjee	Communist Party of India (Marxist)
Garden Reach	None	Fazle Azim Molla	Indian National Congress
Maheshtala	None	Abul Basar	Communist Party of India (Marxist)
Budge Budge	None	Kshiti Bhusan Roy Barman	Communist Party of India (Marxist)
Satgachia	None	Jyoti Basu	Communist Party of India (Marxist)
Falta	None	Arti Das Gupta	Communist Party of India (Marxist)
Diamond Harbour	None	Abdul Quiyom Molla	Communist Party of India (Marxist)
Magrahat West	None	Abdus Chhohan Gazi	Communist Party of India (Marxist)
Magrahat East	SC	Radhika Ranjan Pramanik	Communist Party of India (Marxist)
Mandirbazar	SC	Subhash Roy	Communist Party of India (Marxist)
Mathurapur	None	Bapuli Satya Ranjan	Indian National Congress
Kulpi	SC	Krishnadhan Halder	Communist Party of India (Marxist)
Patharpratima	None	Gunadhar Maity	Communist Party of India (Marxist)
Kakdwip	None	Hrishikesh Maity	Communist Party of India (Marxist)
Sagar	None	Prabhanjan Mondal	Communist Party of India (Marxist)
Bijpur	None	Jagadish Chandra Das	Communist Party of India (Marxist)
Naihati	None	Tarun Adhikary	Indian National Congress
Bhatpara	None	Satyanaryan Singh	Indian National Congress
Jagatdal	None	Nihar Basu	All India Forward Bloc
Noapara	None	Jamini Bhusan Saha	Communist Party of India (Marxist)
Titagarh	None	Ganga Prasad Shah	Indian National Congress
Khardah	None	Asim Kumar Dasgupta	Communist Party of India (Marxist)
Panihati	None	Gopalkrishna Bhattacharya	Communist Party of India (Marxist)
Kamarhati	None	Radhika Ranjan Banerjee	Communist Party of India (Marxist)
Baranagar	None	Matish Roy	Revolutionary Socialist Party
Dum Dum	None	Santi Ranjan Ghatak	Communist Party of India (Marxist)
Belgachia East	None	Subhash Chakraborty	Communist Party of India (Marxist)
Cossipur	None	Dipak Chanda	Communist Party of India (Marxist)
Shyampukur	None	Kiron Chowdhury	Indian National Congress
Jorabagan	None	Subrata Mukherjee	Indian National Congress
Jorasanko	None	Deoki Nandan Poddar	Indian National Congress
Bara Bazar	None	Rajesh Khaitan	Indian National Congress
Bow Bazar	None	Sudip Bandyopadhyay	Indian National Congress
Chowringhee	None	Debi Prasad Chattopadhyay	Indian National Congress
Kabitirtha	None	Ram Pyare Ram	Indian National Congress
Alipore	None	Saugata Roy	Indian National Congress
Rashbehari Avenue	None	Hoimi Basu	Indian National Congress
Tollygunge	None	Prosanta Kumar Sur	Communist Party of India (Marxist)
Dhakuria	None	Jatin Chakroborty	Revolutionary Socialist Party
Ballygunge	None	Sachin Sen	Communist Party of India (Marxist)
Entally	None	Sultan Ahmed	Indian National Congress
Taltola	SC	Sumanta Kumar Hira	Communist Party of India (Marxist)
Beliaghata	None	Manabendra Mukherjee	Communist Party of India (Marxist)
Sealdah	None	Somendra Nath Mitra	Indian National Congress
Vidyasagar	None	Lakshmi Kanta Dey	Communist Party of India (Marxist)
Burtola	None	Sadhan Pande	Indian National Congress
Manicktola	None	Shyamal Chakraborty	Communist Party of India (Marxist)
Belgachia West	None	Sudipto Roy	Indian National Congress
Bally	None	Supriya Basu	Indian National Congress
Howrah North	None	Asok Ghosh	Indian National Congress
Howrah Central	None	Ambica Banerjee	Indian National Congress
Howrah South	None	Mrityunjoy Banerjee	Indian National Congress
Shibpur	None	Satyendra Nath Ghose	All India Forward Bloc
Domjur	None	Joykesh Mukherjee	Communist Party of India (Marxist)
Jagatballavpur	None	M. Ansaruddin	Communist Party of India (Marxist)
Panchla	None	Sailendra Nath Mondol	All India Forward Bloc
Sankrail	SC	Haran Hazra	Communist Party of India (Marxist)
Uluberia North	SC	Raj Kumar Mondal	Communist Party of India (Marxist)
Uluberia South	None	Amar Banerjee (chobi)	Indian National Congress
Shyampur	None	Gourhari Adak	Communist Party of India (Marxist)
Bagnan	None	Nirupama Chattopadhyay	Communist Party of India (Marxist)
Kalyanpur	None	Nitai Charan Adak	Communist Party of India (Marxist)
Amta	None	Barindra Nath Koley	Communist Party of India (Marxist)
Udaynarayanpur	None	Pannalal Maji	Communist Party of India (Marxist)
Jangipara	None	Manindar Nath Jana	Communist Party of India (Marxist)
Chanditala	None	Ghosh Malin	Communist Party of India (Marxist)
Uttarpara	None	Santashri Chatterjee	Communist Party of India (Marxist)
Serampore	None	Arun Kumar Goswami	Indian National Congress
Champdani	None	Sunil Sarkar	Communist Party of India (Marxist)
Chandernagore	None	Sandhya Chattopadhyay	Communist Party of India (Marxist)
Singur	None	Bidyut Kr. Das	Communist Party of India (Marxist)
Haripal	None	Balai Banerjee	Communist Party of India (Marxist)
Tarakeswar	None	Santi Chatterjee	Independent
Chinsurah	None	Narendra Nath Dey	All India Forward Bloc
Bansberia	None	Prabir Sen Gupta	Communist Party of India (Marxist)
Balagarh	SC	Abinash Pramanik	Communist Party of India (Marxist)
Pandua	None	Deb Narayan Chakraborty	Communist Party of India (Marxist)
Polba	None	Brojo Gopal Neogy	Communist Party of India (Marxist)
Dhaniakhali	SC	Kirpasindhu Saha	All India Forward Bloc
Pursurah	None	Buishnupada Bera	Communist Party of India (Marxist)
Khanakul	SC	Schindra Nath Hajra	Communist Party of India (Marxist)
Arambagh	None	Benode Das	Communist Party of India (Marxist)
Goghat	SC	Malick Shibprashad	All India Forward Bloc
Chandrakona	None	Umapati Chakrabortty	Communist Party of India (Marxist)
Ghatal	SC	Ratanchandra Pakhira	Communist Party of India (Marxist)
Daspur	None	Prabhas Phodikar	Communist Party of India (Marxist)
Nandanpur	None	Chhaya Bera	Communist Party of India (Marxist)
Panskura West	None	Sk. Omar Ali	Communist Party of India
Panskura East	None	Sibaram Basu	Communist Party of India (Marxist)
Tamluk	None	Surajit Saran Bagchi	Communist Party of India
Moyna	None	Pulin Bera	Communist Party of India (Marxist)
Mahishadal	None	Surya Chakarbarti	Communist Party of India (Marxist)
Sutahata	SC	Lakshman Chandra Seth	Communist Party of India (Marxist)
Nandigram	None	Saktiprasad Bal	Communist Party of India
Narghat	None	Bankim Behari Maity	Independent
Bhagabanpur	None	Pradhan Prasanta	Communist Party of India (Marxist)
Khajuri	SC	Sunirmal Paik	Independent
Contai North	None	Ram Sankar Kar	Communist Party of India (Marxist)
Contai South	None	Sukhendu Maiti	Communist Party of India
Ramnagar	None	Sudhir Kumar Giri	Communist Party of India (Marxist)
Egra	None	Sinha Prabodh Chandra	Independent
Mugberia	None	Kiranmay Nanda	Independent
Pataspur	None	Kamakshyanandan Das Mahapatra	Communist Party of India
Sabang	None	Manas Ranjan Bhunia	Indian National Congress
Pingla	None	Hari Pada Jana	Independent
Debra	None	Sheikh Jahangir Karim	Communist Party of India (Marxist)
Keshpur	SC	Himansu Kumar	Communist Party of India (Marxist)
Garhbeta East	None	Susanta Ghosh	Communist Party of India (Marxist)
Garhbeta West	SC	Krishnaprasad Duley	Communist Party of India (Marxist)
Salbani	None	Sundar Hazra	Communist Party of India (Marxist)
Midnapore	None	Kamakhya Charan Ghosh	Communist Party of India
Kharagpur Town	None	Gyan Singh Sohanpal	Indian National Congress
Kharagpur Rural	None	Sheikh Najmul Haque	Communist Party of India (Marxist)
Keshiari	ST	Maheswar Murmu	Communist Party of India (Marxist)
Narayangarh	None	Bibhuti Bhusan De	Communist Party of India (Marxist)
Dantan	None	Kanai Bhomik	Communist Party of India
Nayagram	ST	Ananta Saren	Communist Party of India (Marxist)
Gopiballavpur	None	De Sunil	Communist Party of India (Marxist)
Jhargram	None	Abani Bhusan Satpathi	Communist Party of India (Marxist)
Binpur	ST	Durga Tudu	Communist Party of India (Marxist)
Banduan	ST	Lakshi Ram Kisku	Communist Party of India (Marxist)
Manbazar	None	Kamalakanta Mahata	Communist Party of India (Marxist)
Balrampur	ST	Bikram Tudu	Communist Party of India (Marxist)
Arsa	None	Kumar Pandab	All India Forward Bloc
Jhalda	None	Satyaranjan Mahato	All India Forward Bloc
Jaipur	None	Bindeswar Mahato	All India Forward Bloc
Purulia	None	Mamata Mukherjee	Communist Party of India (Marxist)
Para	SC	Gobinda Bauri	Communist Party of India (Marxist)
Raghunathpur	SC	Natabar Bagdi	Communist Party of India (Marxist)
Kashipur	ST	Surendra Nath Majhi	Communist Party of India (Marxist)
Hura	None	Ambarish Mukhopadhyay	Communist Party of India (Marxist)
Taldangra	None	Amiya Patra	Communist Party of India (Marxist)
Raipur	ST	Upen Kisku	Communist Party of India (Marxist)
Ranibandh	ST	Rampada Mandi	Communist Party of India (Marxist)
Indpur	SC	Madan Bauri	Communist Party of India
Chhatna	None	Subjas Goswami	Revolutionary Socialist Party
Gangajalghati	SC	Nabani Bauri	Communist Party of India (Marxist)
Barjora	None	Jayasree Mitra	Communist Party of India (Marxist)
Bankura	None	Partha De	Communist Party of India (Marxist)
Onda	None	Anil Mukherjee	All India Forward Bloc
Vishnupur	None	Achintya Krishna Ray	Communist Party of India (Marxist)
Kotulpur	None	Gouri Pada Dutta	Communist Party of India (Marxist)
Indas	SC	Badan Bora	Communist Party of India (Marxist)
Sonamukhi	SC	Sukhendu Khan	Communist Party of India (Marxist)
Kulti	None	Tuhin Samanta	Indian National Congress
Barabani	None	Ajit Kumar Chakarbarty	Communist Party of India (Marxist)
Hirapur	None	Suhrid Basu Mallik	Indian National Congress
Asansol	None	Prabuddha Laha	Indian National Congress
Raniganj	None	Bansa Gopal Choudhuri	Communist Party of India (Marxist)
Jamuria	None	Bikash Chowdhury	Communist Party of India (Marxist)
Ukhra	SC	Bagdi Lakhan	Communist Party of India (Marxist)
Durgapur-i	None	Dilip Mazumdar	Communist Party of India (Marxist)
Durgapur-ii	None	Tarun Chatterjee	Communist Party of India (Marxist)
Kanksa	SC	Krishna Chandra Halder	Communist Party of India (Marxist)
Ausgram	SC	Sridhar Malik	Communist Party of India (Marxist)
Bhatar	None	Syed Md. Masih	Communist Party of India (Marxist)
Galsi	None	Sen Deb Ranjan	All India Forward Bloc
Burdwan North	None	Chowdhury Binoy Krishna	Communist Party of India (Marxist)
Burdwan South	None	Sen Nirupam	Communist Party of India (Marxist)
Khandaghosh	SC	Shibaprasad Dalui	Communist Party of India (Marxist)
Raina	None	Dhirendranath Chatterjee	Communist Party of India (Marxist)
Jamalpur	SC	Sunil Santra	Independent
Memari	None	Konar Maharani	Communist Party of India (Marxist)
Kalna	None	Anju Kar	Communist Party of India (Marxist)
Nadanghat	None	Mansur Habibullah	Communist Party of India (Marxist)
Manteswar	None	Hemanta Roy	Communist Party of India (Marxist)
Purbasthali	None	Manoranjan Nath	Communist Party of India (Marxist)
Katwa	None	Anjan Chatterjee	Communist Party of India (Marxist)
Mangalkot	None	Nikhilananda Sar	Communist Party of India (Marxist)
Ketugram	SC	Raicharan Majhi	Communist Party of India (Marxist)
Nanur	SC	Ananda Gopal Das	Communist Party of India (Marxist)
Bolpur	None	Tarapada Ghosh	Revolutionary Socialist Party
Labhpur	None	Majumdar Sunil	Communist Party of India (Marxist)
Dubrajpur	None	Bhakti Bhusan Mandal	All India Forward Bloc
Rajnagar	SC	Bijoy Bagdi	All India Forward Bloc
Suri	None	Tapan Ray	Communist Party of India (Marxist)
Mahammad Bazar	None	Dhiren Sen	Communist Party of India (Marxist)
Mayureswar	SC	Dhiren Let	Communist Party of India (Marxist)
Rampurhat	None	Sasanka Mondal	All India Forward Bloc
Hansan	SC	Asit Kumar Mal	Indian National Congress
Nalhati	None	Sattick Kumar Roy	All India Forward Bloc
Murarai	None	Motahar Hossain	Indian National Congress
