= Hooghly Lok Sabha constituency =

Lok Sabha constituency in West Bengal

Coordinates: 22.9°N 88.4°E

Hooghly WB-28
- Lok Sabha constituency
- Interactive Map Outlining Hooghly Lok Sabha Constituency

Constituency details
- Country: India
- Region: East India
- State: West Bengal
- Assembly constituencies: Singur; Chandannagar; Chunchura; Balagarh; Pandua; Saptagram; Dhanekhali
- Established: 1951
- Total electors: 1,630,042
- Reservation: None

Member of Parliament
- 18th Lok Sabha
- Incumbent Rachna Banerjee
- Party: NCPI
- Alliance: NDA
- Elected year: 2024

Hooghly Lok Sabha constituency is one of the 543 parliamentary constituencies in India. The constituency centres on Hugli-Chuchura in West Bengal. All seven assembly segments of No. 28 Hooghly Lok Sabha constituency are in Hooghly district.

== Overview ==
1. Cooch Behar, 2. Alipurduars, 3. Jalpaiguri, 4. Darjeeling, 5. Raiganj, 6. Balurghat, 7. Maldaha Uttar, 8. Maldaha Dakshin, 9. Jangipur, 10. Baharampur, 11. Murshidabad, 12. Krishnanagar, 13. Ranaghat, 14. Bangaon, 15. Barrackpore, 16. Dum Dum, 17. Barasat, 18. Basirhat, 19. Jaynagar, 20. Mathurapur, 21. Diamond Harbour, 22. Jadavpur, 23. Kolkata Dakshin, 24. Kolkata Uttar, 25. Howrah, 26. Uluberia, 27. Serampore, 28. Hooghly, 29. Arambagh, 30. Tamluk, 31, Kanthi, 32. Ghatal, 33. Jhargram, 34. Medinipur, 35. Purulia, 36. Bankura, 37. Bishnupur, 38. Bardhaman Purba, 39. Bardhaman Durgapur, 40. Asansol, 41. Bolpur, 42. Birbhum

Hoogly constituency, shares a large industrial area on the western bank of the Hooghly river in the district with Sreerampur and has a rich agricultural hinterland.

According to The Statesman, "The Hooghly Lok Sabha constituency had remained a Communist bastion till the Trinamul snatched their thunder in the 2009 General Election. The constituency has the distinction of having a rich colonial history with the Portuguese settlement at Bandel, the French colony at Chandannagore, the Danish settlement at Serampore… and Chinsurah, a former Dutch colony. Despite ruling West Bengal for 35 years, the Marxist government alienated its people by such historical blunders as the forcible acquisition of fertile agricultural land in Singur which forms part of the Hooghly constituency."

The Dunlop tyre plant at Sahaganj, in this constituency is closed. According to Hindustan Times, "The entire jute industry, with eight mills in Hooghly, is sick…From Tribeni in north to Hind Motor in south, by the bank of Hooghly exists the Hooghly industrial belt, now seeking oxygen. Two fertiliser units, one food processing unit, two cotton mills, one steel plant and many other small and medium scale units have closed down over the years."

== Assembly segments ==
As per order of the Delimitation Commission issued in 2006 in respect of the delimitation of constituencies in the West Bengal, parliamentary constituency no. 28 Hooghly is composed of the following segments:

#	Name	District	Member	Party	2024 Lead
188	Singur	Hooghly	Arup Kumar Das	BJP	AITC
189	Chandannagar	Hooghly	Deepanjan Kumar Guha	BJP	AITC
190	Chunchura	Hooghly	Subir Nag	BJP	BJP
191	Balagarh (SC)	Hooghly	Sumana Sarkar	BJP	BJP
192	Pandua	Hooghly	Tushar Kumar Majumdar	BJP	AITC
193	Saptagram	Hooghly	Swaraj Ghosh	BJP	BJP
197	Dhanekhali (SC)	Hooghly	Ashima Patra	AITC	AITC

Prior to delimitation, Hooghly Lok Sabha constituency was composed of the following assembly segments:Chandernagore (assembly constituency no. 182), Singur (assembly constituency no. 183), Haripal (assembly constituency no. 184), Chinsurah (assembly constituency no. 186), Bansberia (assembly constituency no. 193), Polba (assembly constituency no. 190), Dhaniakhali (SC) (assembly constituency no. 191)

== Members of Parliament ==
Year	Member	Party
1952	Nirmal Chandra Chatterjee	Hindu Mahasabha
1957	Provat Kar	Communist Party of India
1962	Provat Kar	Communist Party of India
1967	Bijoy Krishna Modak	Communist Party of India (Marxist)
1971	Bijoy Krishna Modak	Communist Party of India (Marxist)
1977	Bijoy Krishna Modak	Communist Party of India (Marxist)
1980	Rupchand Pal	Communist Party of India (Marxist)
1984	Indumati Bhattacharya	Indian National Congress
1989	Rupchand Pal	Communist Party of India (Marxist)
1991	Rupchand Pal	Communist Party of India (Marxist)
1996	Rupchand Pal	Communist Party of India (Marxist)
1998	Rupchand Pal	Communist Party of India (Marxist)
1999	Rupchand Pal	Communist Party of India (Marxist)
2004	Rupchand Pal	Communist Party of India (Marxist)
2009	Ratna De Nag	Trinamool Congress
2014	Ratna De Nag	Trinamool Congress
2019	Locket Chatterjee	Bharatiya Janata Party
2024	Rachna Banerjee	Trinamool Congress
2026 (Note: Switched to NCPI as part of AITC Rebels in Lok Sabha.)	Rachna Banerjee	Nationalist Citizens Party of India

== Election results ==
=== General election 2024 ===
2024 Indian general elections: Hooghly
Party	Candidate	Votes	%	±%
AITC	Rachna Banerjee	702,744	46.31	▲5.31
BJP	Locket Chatterjee	625,891	41.24	▼4.79
CPI(M)	Monodip Ghosh	139,919	9.22	▲0.88
NOTA	None of the above	13,352	0.88	▼0.05
Majority		76,853	5.1	
Turnout		1,517,511	81.38	
AITC gain from BJP		Swing	4.3	

=== General election 2019 ===
2019 Indian general elections: Hooghly
Party	Candidate	Votes	%	±%
BJP	Locket Chatterjee	671,448	46.03	+29.66
AITC	Ratna De Nag	598,086	41.00	−4.51
CPI(M)	Pradip Saha	121,588	8.34	−27.18
INC	Pratul Chandra Saha	25,374	1.74	−1.39
NOTA	None of the above	13,525	0.93	N/A
Majority		73,362	5.03	
Turnout		1,457,842	82.52	−0.18
BJP gain from AITC		Swing	+17.09	

=== General election 2014 ===
2014 Indian general elections: Hooghly
Party	Candidate	Votes	%	±%
AITC	Dr. Ratna De (Nag)	614,312	45.54	−6.83
CPI(M)	Pradip Saha	425,228	31.52	−10.84
BJP	Chandan Mitra	221,271	16.40	+12.98
INC	Pritam Ghosh	42,226	3.13	N/A
CPI(ML)L	Sajal Adhikari	9,152	0.67	−0.36
SUCI(C)	Paban Mazumder	7,682	0.56	
BSP	Vijay Kumar Mahato	5,519	0.40	−0.45
RJP	Sanghamitra Mukherjee	3,766	0.27	
JDP	Shukchand Murmu	3,197	0.23	−0.83
Majority		189,084	14.02	+7.01
Turnout		1,348,870	82.75	+0.04
AITC hold		Swing	-3.83	

=== General election 2009 ===
General Election, 2009: Hooghly
Party	Candidate	Votes	%	±%
AITC	Dr. Ratna De (Nag)	574,022	52.37	+16.47
CPI(M)	Rupchand Pal	492,499	42.36	−11.64
BJP	Dr. Chuni Lal Chakraborty	39,784	3.42	
JDP	Swapan Murmu	12,417	1.06	
CPI(ML)L	Sajal Adhikari	12,068	1.03	
Independent	Satya Gopal Dey	10,119	0.87	
BSP	Suryya Kanta Ray	9,933	0.85	
Independent	Alok Pathak	6,908	0.59	
SP	Arabinda Sen	4,894	0.42	
Majority		81,523	7.01	
Turnout		1,162,646	82.71	
AITC gain from CPI(M)		Swing		

=== General election 2004 ===
General Election, 2004: Hooghly
Party	Candidate	Votes	%	±%
CPI(M)	Rupchand Pal	496,890	54.00	
AITC	Indrani Mukherjee	329,924	35.90	
INC	Ashok Kumar Das	70,173	7.60	
JDP	Keshab Chandra Soren	16,931	1.80	
BSP	Matilal Mandal	11,101	1.20	
Majority		166,966	18.2	
Turnout		919,683	79.2	
CPI(M) hold		Swing		

=== General elections 1951-2024 ===
Most of the contests were multi-cornered. However, only winners and runners-up are mentioned below:

Year	Winner		Runner-up	
Year	Candidate	Party	Candidate	Party
1951	Nirmal Chandra Chatterjee	Hindu Mahasabha	Renuka Roy	Indian National Congress
1957	Provat Kar	Communist Party of India	Sachindra Chowdhury	Indian National Congress
1962	Provat Kar	Communist Party of India	Nirmal Kumar Sen	Indian National Congress
1967	Bijoy Krishna Modak	Communist Party of India (Marxist)	P.K. Palit	Indian National Congress
1972	Bijoy Krishna Modak	Communist Party of India (Marxist)	Phani Ghosh	Indian National Congress
1977	Bijoy Krishna Modak	Communist Party of India (Marxist)	Bishnu Charan Banerjee	Indian National Congress
1980	Rupchand Pal	Communist Party of India (Marxist)	Santimohan Roy	Indian National Congress (I)
1984	Indumati Bhattacharya	Indian National Congress	Rupchand Pal	Communist Party of India (Marxist)
1989	Rupchand Pal	Communist Party of India (Marxist)	Umasankar Halder	Indian National Congress
1991	Rupchand Pal	Communist Party of India (Marxist)	Umasankar Halder	Indian National Congress
1996	Rupchand Pal	Communist Party of India (Marxist)	Gouri Sankar Banerjee	Indian National Congress
1998	Rupchand Pal	Communist Party of India (Marxist)	Tapan Dasgupta	Trinamool Congress
1999	Rupchand Pal	Communist Party of India (Marxist)	Tapan Dasgupta	Trinamool Congress
2004	Rupchand Pal	Communist Party of India (Marxist)	Indrani Mukherjee	Trinamool Congress
2009	Ratna De Nag	Trinamool Congress	Rupchand Pal	Communist Party of India (Marxist)
2014	Ratna De Nag	Trinamool Congress	Pradip Saha	Communist Party of India (Marxist)
2019	Locket Chatterjee	Bharatiya Janata Party	Ratna De Nag	Trinamool Congress
2024	Rachna Banerjee	Trinamool Congress	Locket Chatterjee	Bharatiya Janata Party

== See also ==
- List of constituencies of the Lok Sabha
- Election Commission of India
- Chandannagar Subdivision
