= Recitation =

Act of reciting or formal reading

A recitation in a general sense is the act of reciting from memory, or a formal reading of verse or other writing before an audience.

Public recitation is the act of reciting a work of writing before an audience.

== Academic recitation ==
Caesar, Bellum Gallicum 1,1, spoken by a German, exaggerated to hear the stressed syllables.

In academia, recitation is a presentation made by a student to demonstrate knowledge of a subject or to provide instruction to others. In some academic institutions the term is used for a presentation by a teaching assistant or instructor, under the guidance of a senior faculty member, that supplements course materials. In recitations that supplement lectures, the leader will often review the lecture, expand on the concepts, and carry on a discussion with the students.

In its most basic form, a student would recite verbatim poems or essays of others, either to the teacher or tutor directly, or in front of a class or body of assembled students.

In classes involving mathematics and engineering, a recitation is often used as the vehicle to perform derivations or solve problems similar to those assigned to the students.

Scientific classes, such as biology, chemistry, and physics, often employ the use of recitation sections to help students clarify subject matter that was either not fully understood or inadequately addressed in the limited time of lecture. These recitation sections may be conducted by the professor or a student teaching assistant. These sections provide students with an opportunity to receive additional instruction on confusing subject matter or receive personal assistance with problems or questions assigned as homework in the lecture section. Some universities may require attendance at regularly scheduled recitation sections in addition to any required labs. Recitations may also provide students with additional opportunities for receiving grades for the lecture portion of the course. Despite mandatory attendance and additional time spent in the classroom, these sections usually do not count towards university credits required for graduation, but may significantly increase a student's ability to understand important concepts required to pass the course.

== Religious recitation ==
Recitations of holy scriptures and prayers are common in the liturgies of Abrahamic religions.

=== Islam ===
Quran literally means "recitation". The 1924 Cairo Quran, the Quran that is in "general use" throughout almost all the Muslim world today, is based on the "Ḥafṣ" version ("qira'at") based on ʻAsim's recitation, the 8th-century recitation of Kufa. ۞ It uses a system of additional symbols and an elaborate system of modified vowel-signs and for minute details, not identical to any older system.

== Recitation as a performing art ==
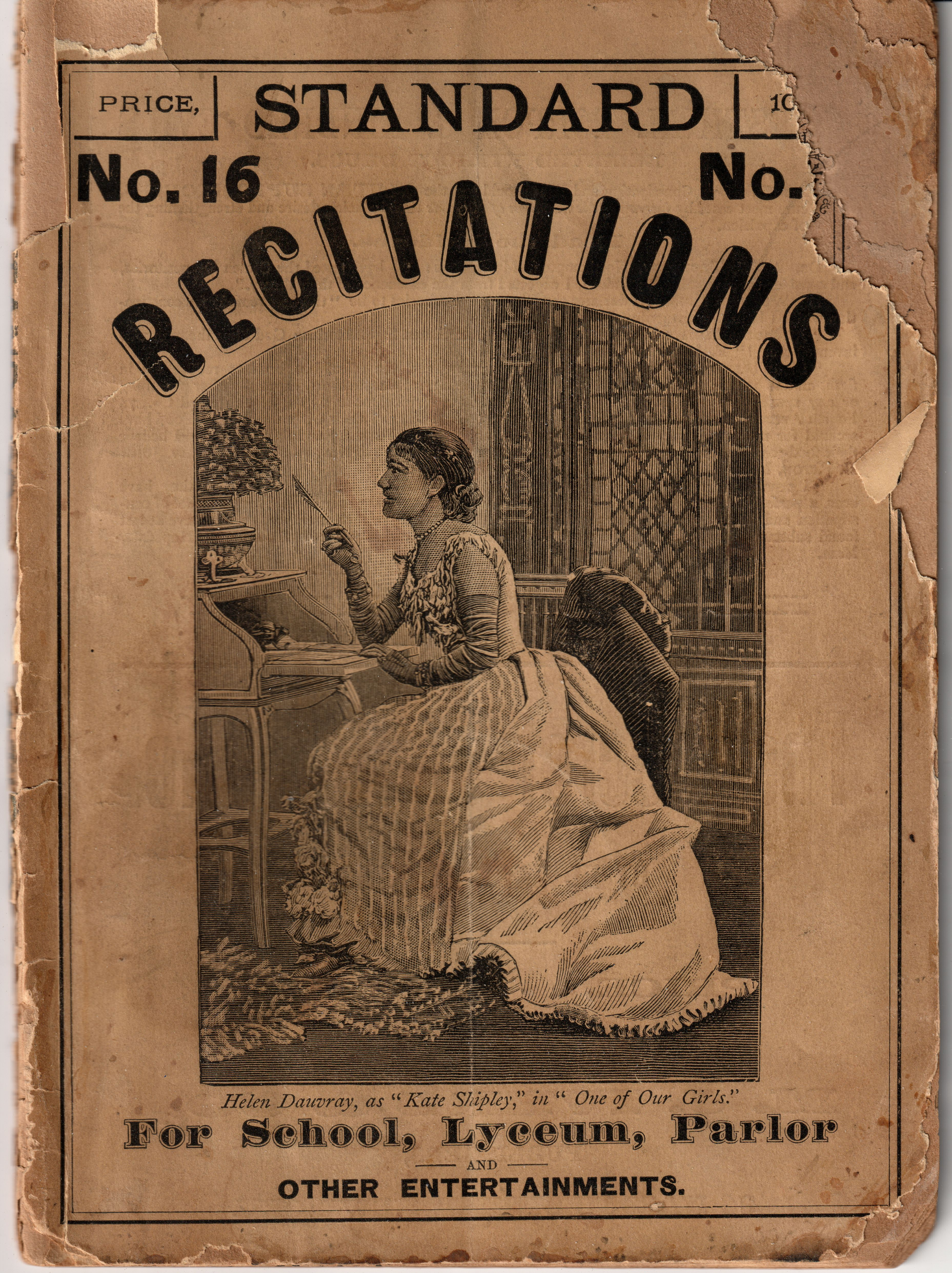
A 19th-century booklet of recitations

Recitation is practiced as a performing art especially in Bangladesh and India. Nowadays it is a popular art form in Bengal. The reciters recite Bengali poems on stage and electronic media. Shambhu Mitra, Kazi Sabyasachi, Pradeep Ghosh, Partha Ghosh, Gouri Ghosh, Utpal Kundu are great reciters from West Bengal. Reciters like Samiran Sanyal, Bratati Bandyopadhyay, Bijoylakshmi Burman, Pinaki Chattopadhyay, Sutapa Bandyopadhyay, Urmimala Basu, Samya Karpha to name a few, are contributing significantly in this field. There are many such organizations of recitation, with most located in Bangladesh.

It was often popular for a poet to recite his or her newly created poetry to an audience. In the early twentieth century, recitation developed into an autonomous art form.

Recitationes were a common way for Roman poets to test and publicize their works.

=== Recitation to music ===
Accompanied recitations of poetry or dramatic texts, most often for spoken voice and piano, became very popular in nineteenth century Europe as an after dinner entertainment. Jacqueline Waeber has explored how, during the 19th century and particularly in Germany, poetic recitation became increasingly 'musicalized' by the addition of musical accompaniments for the Lied and the musical melodrama, as part of a search for new declamatory styles.

The genre was often looked down on as something for authors and composers of lesser stature, though there are examples by Robert Schumann (Ballads for Declaration, 1850s), Richard Strauss (Enoch Arden, 1897) and Max von Schillings (Das Hexenlied, 1904). The English composer Stanley Hawley made many such settings, some of which were performed at the first season (1895) of the Henry Wood Proms in London. His friend Lena Ashwell was often the performer.

Facade, an entertainment, poems by Edith Sitwell, music by William Walton is a series of poems which are recited (through a megaphone) over an instrumental accompaniment. The speaker (or speakers) declaim in notated rhythm. It was first performed in 1922.
