= Hatni =

Village in West Bengal, India

- Village
- Interactive map of Hatni
- Location within West Bengal Location within India
- Coordinates: 23°05′47″N 88°10′50″E
- Country: India
- State: West Bengal
- District: Hooghly

Government
  - Body: Gram panchayat

Population (2011)
  - Total: 1,893

Languages
  - Official: Bengali, English
- Time zone: UTC+5:30 (IST)
- PIN: 712134
- ISO 3166 code: IN-WB
- Vehicle registration: WB
- Lok Sabha constituency: Hooghly
- Vidhan Sabha constituency: Pandua
- Website: wb.gov.in

Hatni is a census village in Hooghly District in West Bengal, India. The village is located approximately 71 kilometres from Kolkata via the Howrah-Bardhaman Main Line. The nearest railway station is Bainchi.
