= Jagatnagar =

- Census Town
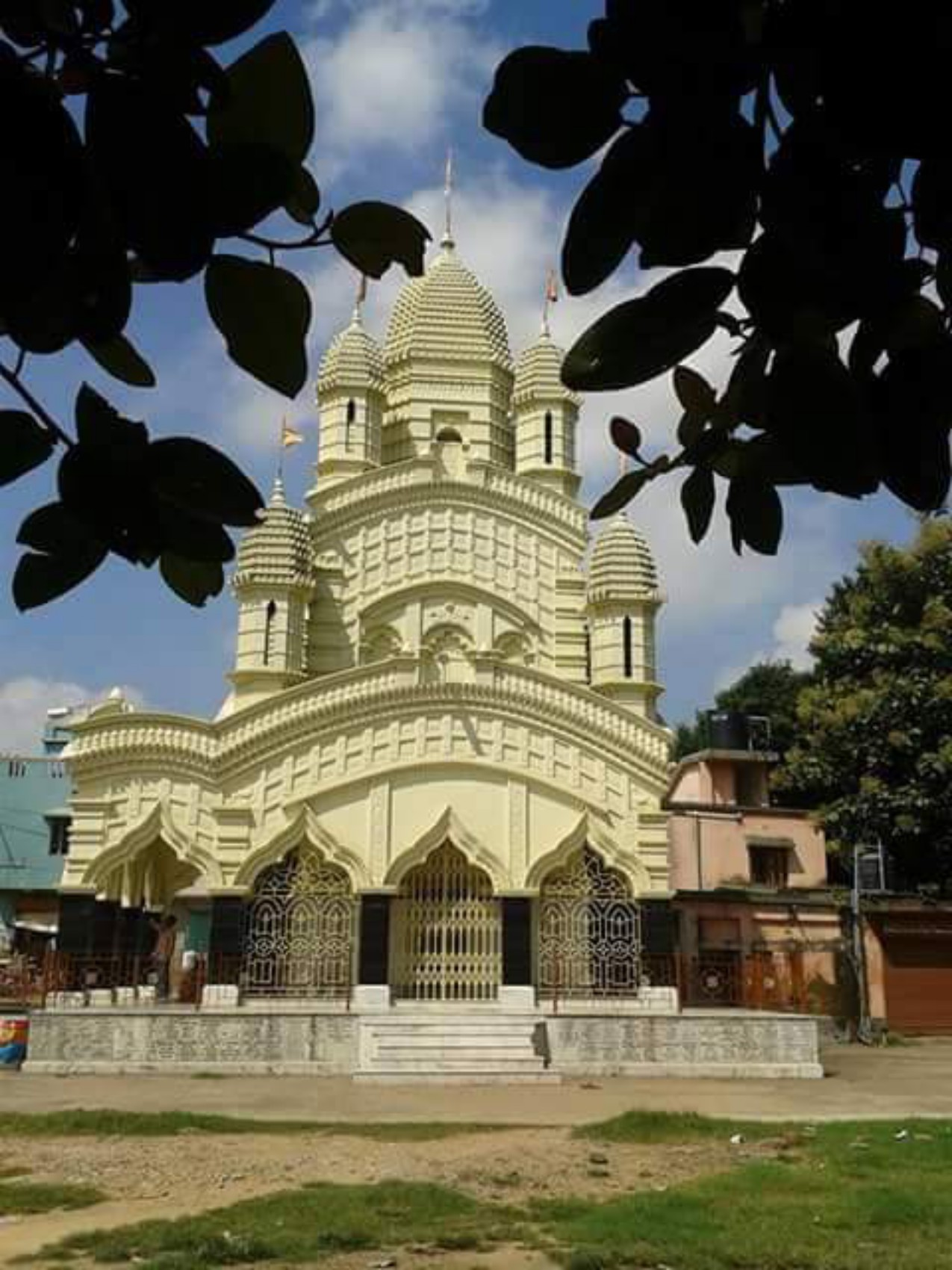
- Jagatnagar Kalibari

- Location in West Bengal, India Jagatnagar (India)
- Coordinates: 22.7840091°N 88.2213113°E
- Country: India
- State: West Bengal
- District: Hooghly

Population (2011)
  - Total: 5,242

Languages
  - Official: Bengali, English
- Time zone: UTC+5:30 (IST)
- Telephone code: 03212
- Vehicle registration: WB
- Lok Sabha constituency: Hooghly
- Vidhan Sabha constituency: Singur

Jagatnagar is a census town in Singur CD Block in Chandannagore subdivision of Hooghly district in the state of West Bengal, India.

== Geography ==
Cities and towns in the Chandannagore subdivision and Polba Dadpur and Dhaniakhali CD Blocks of Chinsurah subdivision in Hooghly district
M: municipal corporation/ municipal city/ town, CT: census town, R: rural/ urban centre,
Owing to space constraints in the small map, the actual locations in a larger map may vary slightly

=== Location ===
Jagatnagar is located at: 22°47′02″N 88°13′17″E

The area is composed of flat alluvial plains that form a part of the Gangetic Delta.

=== Urbanisation ===
In Chandannagore subdivision 58.52% of the population is rural and the urban population is 41.48%. Chandannagore subdivision has 1 municipal corporation, 3 municipalities and 7 census towns. The single municipal corporation is Chandernagore Municipal Corporation. The municipalities are Tarakeswar Municipality, Bhadreswar Municipality and Champdany Municipality. Of the three CD Blocks in Chandannagore subdivision, Tarakeswar CD Block is wholly rural, Haripal CD Block is predominantly rural with just 1 census town, and Singur CD Block is slightly less rural with 6 census towns. Polba Dadpur and Dhaniakhali CD Blocks of Chinsurah subdivision (included in the map alongside) are wholly rural. The municipal areas are industrialised. All places marked in the map are linked in the larger full screen map.

== Demographics ==
As per 2011 Census of India Jagatnagar (CT) had a total population of 5,242 of which 2,675 (51%) were males and 2,567 (49%) were females. Population below 6 years was 452. The total number of literates in Jagatnagar was 4,054 (84.63% of the population over 6 years).

== Transport ==
The nearest railway station, Mirzapur-Bankipur railway station is 29 kilometres (18 mi) from Howrah on the Howrah-Bardhaman chord line and is a part of the Kolkata Suburban Railway system.
