= Banga Bhushan =

Banga Bhushan বঙ্গভূষণ (Bengali)
- State Civilian award
- Awarded for: Services of personalities in various fields
- Sponsored by: Government of West Bengal
- Location: West Bengal
- Reward: ₹ 100,000
- First award: 2011
- Final award: 2022

Banga Bhushan (Bengali: বঙ্গভূষণ) is the second highest title instituted by the West Bengal Government to honour the services of personalities in various fields.

== List of awardees ==
=== 2022 ===
| Name | Field |
|---|---|
| Rituparna Sengupta | Actress |
| Indrani Haldar | Actress |
| Rabilal Tudu | Santhali literature and culture |
| Pandit Debojyoti Bose | Musician (Sarod player) |
| Mahendra Nath Roy | Professor (Chemistry) |
| Kaushiki Chakraborty | Singer |
| Abul Bashar | Writer |
| Shreya Ghoshal | Singer |
| Harshavardhan Neotia | Entrepreneur |
| Jeet Gannguli | Music composer |
| Jeet | Actor |

=== 2018 ===
| Name | Field |
|---|---|
| Arundhati Holme Chowdhury | Singer |
| Partha Ghosh | Culture / Recitation |
| Sriradha Bandyopadhyay | Singer |

=== 2017 ===
| Name | Field |
|---|---|
| Chapal Bhaduri | Theatre / Jatra |
| Dr. Abhijit Chowdhury | Medicine |
| Ganat Rava | Folk culture |
| Khejmot Fakir | Folk music |
| Lakhan Das Baul | Folk music |
| Rezwana Choudhury Bannya | Singer |

=== 2015 ===
| Name | Field |
|---|---|
| Al-Ameen Mission | Institution |
| Deepak Adhikari (Dev) | Actor |
| Dr. Subrata Maitra | Medicine |
| Dr. Tridib Banerjee | Medicine |
| Kalyanbrata Chakraborty | Education |
| Kartik Das Baul | Singer |
| Kaushik Ganguly | Film director |
| Laxmi Ratan Shukla | Cricket |
| Manoj Tiwary | Cricket |
| Nima Wangdi Sherpa | Social work |
| Shoojit Sircar | Film director |
| Subodh Sarkar | Literature |
| Surya Shekhar Ganguly | Chess |
| Tejendra Narayan Majumdar | Musician (Sarod player) |
| Tushar Kanti Sheel | Sports |

=== 2014 ===
| Name | Field |
|---|---|
| Aparajita Adhya | Actor |
| Bachchan Singh Saral | Media |
| Baichung Bhutia | Football |
| Bidesh Ranjan Bose | Football |
| Birsha Tirke | Social worker |
| Debashree Roy | Actor |
| Gautam Sarkar | Football |
| Indranil Sen | Singer |
| Lopamudra Mitra | Singer |
| Mohammad Abdul Wahab | Social worker |
| Dr.Munshi Golam Mustafa | Scientist / Education |
| Shabbir Ali | Football |
| Shyam Thapa | Football |
| Srikanta Acharya | Singer |
| Swagatalakshmi Dasgupta | Singer |

=== 2013 ===
| Name | Field |
|---|---|
| Dibyendu Barua | Chess |
| Gurbux Singh | Hockey |
| Jhulan Goswami | Cricket |
| Leander Paes | Tennis |
| Mantu Ghosh | Table tennis |
| Poulomi Ghatak | Table tennis |

=== 2012 ===
| Name | Field |
|---|---|
| Bikram Ghosh | Musician (Tabla player) |
| Nachiketa Chakraborty | Singer |
| Rashid Khan | Singer |

== See also ==
- Banga Bibhushan
