= Madhumita Ghosh =

Indian politician (born 1974)

Member of the West Bengal Legislative Assembly
- Incumbent
- Assumed office 4 May 2026
- Preceded by: Karabi Manna
- Constituency: Haripal

Personal details
- Party: Bharatiya Janata Party
- Profession: Politician

Madhumita Ghosh (born 1974) is an Indian politician from West Bengal. She is a member of the West Bengal Legislative Assembly from Haripal Assembly constituency in Hooghly district, representing the Bharatiya Janata Party.

Ghosh is from Haripal, Hooghly district, West Bengal. She married Purnendu Ghosh, a government employee. She studied till Class 12 and passed the examinations conducted by West Bengal Council of Higher Secondary Education in 1991. She declared assets worth Rs.1 crore in her affidavit to the Election Commission of India.

== Career ==
Ghosh won the Haripal Assembly constituency representing the Bharatiya Janata Party in the 2026 West Bengal Legislative Assembly election. She polled 1,13,332 votes and defeated her nearest rival, Karabi Manna of the All India Trinamool Congress, by a margin of 3,488 votes.
