= Indumati Bhattacharya =

Indian politician (1918–1990)

Member of parliament, Lok Sabha
- In office 1984–1989
- Preceded by: Rupchand Pal
- Succeeded by: Rupchand Pal
- Constituency: Hooghly, West Bengal

Personal details
- Born: 2 July 1918 Hooghly district, Bengal Presidency, British India
- Died: 20 April 1990 (aged 71) Chandernagar, West Bengal, India
- Party: Indian National Congress
- Spouse: Umanath Bhattacharyya
- Children: 1 Son

Indumati Bhattacharya (2 July 1918 – 20 April 1990) was an Indian politician. She was elected to the Lok Sabha, the lower house of the Parliament of India for Hooghly, West Bengal in 1984 as a member of the Indian National Congress. Bhattacharya died in Chandernagar, West Bengal in April 1990 at the age of 71.
