= Mrinal Kanti Dwari =

- মৃণালকান্তি দোয়ারী
- Born: 3 January 1943; Khila Village, Udaynarayanpur ,Howrah, West Bengal, India
- Died: 27 September 2020 (aged 77); Khila Village, Udaynarayanpur ,Howrah, West Bengal, India
- Education: Scottish Church College, Presidency College, Calcutta University
- Occupations: Professor; Textbook writer

Mrinal Kanti Dwari (Bengali: মৃণালকান্তি দোয়ারী) was a physics teacher and professor as well as a textbook author. He was a professor at the department of Physics at the Ramsaday College, University of Calcutta. He was a visiting faculty at the Al-Ameen Mission. Professor Dwari co-authored the physics textbooks, Chhaya Practical Physics Class 12, Chhaya Padarthabidya Class 12 (2023–24), and Chhaya Byabaharik Padarthabidya Class 12.

== Education ==
He received the B.Sc. degree in physics from Scottish Church College in 1963 and M.Sc. degree in physics from the Presidency College, campus of University of Calcutta in 1965, respectively.

== Career ==
He spent few months at Vivekananda Institution, Howrah. In 1965, Dwari was appointed as an assistant professor in the department of Physics at the Ramsaday College University of Calcutta. He went on to become the head of the same department, retiring in 2003, after 38 years of services.

== Book ==
- Chhaya Physics of Class 11
- Chhaya Physics Class-12
