= Sheikh Amjad Hossain =

Indian politician

Sk. Amjad Hossain

Member of the West Bengal Legislative Assembly
- In office 2011–2021
- Constituency: Pandua

Personal details
- Born: August 25, 1978 Pandua, Hooghly district, West Bengal, India
- Party: Communist Party of India (Marxist)
- Education: Burdwan University (BA Hons, 2000); BEd (2005)
- Occupation: Politician; teacher
- Known for: Two‑term MLA from Pandua

Sk. Amjad Hossain (born 25 August 1978) is an Indian politician from West Bengal. He is a former two time member of the West Bengal Legislative Assembly from Pandua Assembly constituency in Hooghly district. He was elected in the 2016 West Bengal Legislative Assembly election representing the Communist Party of India (Marxist).

== Early life and education ==
Hossain is from Pandua, Hooghly district, West Bengal. He is the son of late Mahammed Hossain. He completed his BEd in 2005. Earlier, he did his BA (Honours) in 2000 at a college affiliated with Burdwan University. He is a teacher.

== Career ==
Hossain was first elected as an MLA winning the 2011 West Bengal Legislative Assembly election representing the Communist Party of India (Marxist) from Pandua Assembly constituency. He polled 84,832 votes and beat his closest opponent, Nargis Begum of the All India Trinamool Congress, by a margin of 704 votes. He retained the seat for the Communist Party winning the 2016 West Bengal Legislative Assembly election where he polled 91,489 votes and defeated his nearest rival, Syed Rahim Nabi of the All India Trinamool Congress, by a margin of 1,392 votes. However, he lost the next election in the 2021 West Bengal Legislative Assembly election from Pandua, which was won by Ratna De (Nag) of the All India Trinamool Congress. Contesting again on the Communist Party ticket, Hossain managed 41,474 votes and could finish only third behind Partha Sharma of the Bharatiya Janata Party. Ratna de polled 102,874 votes while Sharma got 71,016 votes.
