= Hindustan Institute of Technology and Science =

Deemed university in Tamil Nadu, India

Hindustan Institute of Technology and Science (Deemed To Be University)
- Former name: Hindustan College of Engineering
- Motto: "TO MAKE EVERY MAN A SUCCESS AND NO MAN A FAILURE"
- Type: Private & Deemed University
- Established: 1985; 41 years ago
- Founder: K.C.G. Verghese
- Parent institution: Hindustan Group of Institutions
- Accreditation: UGC, NAAC
- Chancellor: Anand Jacob Verghese
- Vice-Chancellor: S. N. Sridhara
- Location: Chennai, Tamil Nadu, 603103, India; 12.800753°N 80.224268°E
- Language: English, Tamil, Telugu, Malayalam
- Website: www.hindustanuniv.ac.in

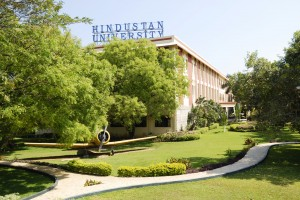
Administrative Building of Hindustan Institute of Technology and Science

Hindustan Institute of Technology and Science (HITS), formerly Hindustan College of Engineering, is a private deemed university headquartered in Chennai, India. It was founded in 1985 by K.C.G. Verghese and was conferred the "University Status" status from the University Grants Commission Under Section 3 of UGC Act 1956 from the academic year 2008-09 and under the name HITS (Hindustan Institute of Technology and Science). It is a member of the Hindustan Group of Institutions which also includes the Hindustan Institute of Engineering Technology, KCG College of Technology, Hindustan College of Arts and Science, Hindustan International Schools, and more.

== Accreditation ==
HITS has been accredited by the National Assessment and Accreditation Council (NAAC) with 'A' Grade.

== Rankings ==
University and college rankings

General – India
- NIRF (Overall) (2024): 151-200

Engineering – India
- NIRF (2024): 101-150

The National Institutional Ranking Framework (NIRF) ranked it in 101-150 band among engineering colleges in 2024.

The institute was ranked in 151-200 band overall in 2024.

== Notable alumni ==
- Arav, actor, model
- Washington Sundar, Cricketer
- Anju kurian, actress, model
