= HIET =

HIET is an initialism that may refer to:

- Hamdard Institute of Engineering Technology, see Hamdard University, Pakistan
- Hindustan Institute of Engineering Technology, Tamil Nadu, India
