= Swaraj Ghosh =

Indian Politician

- স্বরাজ ঘোষ

Member of the West Bengal Legislative Assembly
- Incumbent
- Assumed office 4 May 2026
- Preceded by: Tapan Dasgupta
- Constituency: Saptagram

Personal details
- Party: Bharatiya Janata Party
- Spouse: Purnima Ghosh
- Children: 2
- Parent: Manik Chandra Ghosh
- Occupation: Businessman
- Profession: Politician

Swaraj Ghosh (born 1981) is an Indian politician from West Bengal. He is a member of West Bengal Legislative Assembly from the Saptagram Assembly constituency in Hooghly district representing the Bharatiya Janata Party.

== Early life and education ==
Ghosh is from Saptagram, Hooghly district of West Bengal. He is the son of the late Manik Chandra Ghosh. His studied till Class 10 at Puinan High School and passed the Madhyamik examination conducted by the West Bengal Board of Secondary Education in 1996. He and his wife run the family business. He declared assets worth Rs.27 crore in his affidavit to the Election Commission of India.

== Political career ==
Ghosh won the Saptagram Assembly constituency representing the BJP in the 2026 West Bengal Legislative Assembly election. He polled 1,02,414 votes and defeated his nearest rival, Bidesh Ranjan Bose of the All India Trinamool Congress, by a margin of 23,289 votes.

=== Electoral performance ===
West Bengal Legislative Assembly
Year	Constituency	Party	Votes	%	Opponent	Party	Votes	%	Margin	Result
2026	Saptagram	BJP	1,02,414	52.10	Bidesh Ranjan Bose	AITC	79,125	40.25	23,289	Won

== See also ==
- 2026 West Bengal Legislative Assembly election
- List of chief ministers of West Bengal
- West Bengal Legislative Assembly
