= Haripal Assembly constituency =

Haripal
- Constituency No. 196 for the West Bengal Legislative Assembly
- Interactive Map Outlining Haripal Assembly Constituency

Constituency details
- Country: India
- Region: East India
- State: West Bengal
- District: Hooghly
- Lok Sabha constituency: Arambagh
- Established: 1967
- Total electors: 213,832
- Reservation: None

Member of Legislative Assembly
- 18th West Bengal Legislative Assembly
- Incumbent Madhumita Ghosh
- Party: BJP
- Alliance: NDA
- Elected year: 2026

Haripal Assembly constituency is an assembly constituency in Hooghly district in the Indian state of West Bengal.

== Overview ==
As per orders of the Delimitation Commission, No. 196 Haripal Assembly constituency is composed of the following: Haripal community development block and Balarambati, Basubati and Kamarkundu Gopalnagar, Daluigachha gram panchayats of Singur community development block.

Haripal Assembly constituency is part of No. 29 Arambagh Lok Sabha constituency (SC). It was earlier part of Hooghly Lok Sabha constituency.

== Members of the Legislative Assembly ==
Year	Name	Party
1967	Amalesh Chandra Mazumdar	Samyukta Socialist Party
1969	Amalesh Chandra Mazumdar	Samyukta Socialist Party
1971	Chittaranjan Basu	Workers Party of India
1972	Chittaranjan Basu	Workers Party of India
1977	Balai Banerjee	Communist Party of India (Marxist)
1982	Balai Banerjee	Communist Party of India (Marxist)
1987	Balai Banerjee	Communist Party of India (Marxist)
1991	Kaliprasad Biswas	Communist Party of India (Marxist)
1996	Kaliprasad Biswas	Communist Party of India (Marxist)
2001	Kaliprasad Biswas	Communist Party of India (Marxist)
2006	Bharati Mukherjee	Communist Party of India (Marxist)
2011	Becharam Manna	Trinamool Congress
2016	Becharam Manna	Trinamool Congress
2021	Karabi Manna	Trinamool Congress
2026	Madhumita Ghosh	Bharatiya Janata Party

== Election results ==
Vote share of Winning candidates
2026	46.07%
2021	49.92%
2016	53.22%
2011	53.70%
2006	52.99%
2001	55.52%
1996	52.91%
1991	49.94%
1987	59.28%
1982	57.87%
1977	48.09%
1972	50.85%
1971	49.89%
1969	46.82%
1967	44.02%

=== 2026 ===
2026 West Bengal Legislative Assembly election: Haripal
Party	Candidate	Votes	%	±%
BJP	Madhumita Ghosh	113,332	46.07	▲6.6
AITC	Karabi Manna	109,844	44.65	▼5.27
AISF	Sheikh Muzaffar Ali	12,537	5.1	▼2.05
INC	Saif Azad	1,846	0.75	New entry
Independent	Sheikh Mojaphar Ali	1,815	0.74	New entry
NOTA	None of the above	1,747	0.71	▼0.82
Majority		3,488	1.42	▼9.03
Turnout		245,994	93.03	▲11.16
BJP gain from AITC		Swing		

=== 2021 ===
2021 West Bengal Legislative Assembly election: Haripal
Party	Candidate	Votes	%	±%
AITC	Karabi Manna	110,215	49.92	▼3.3
BJP	Samiran Mitra	87,143	39.47	▲34.13
AISF	Simal Saren	15,795	7.15	New entry
NOTA	None of the above	3,367	1.53	▼0.16
Majority		23,072	10.45	▼4.66
Turnout		220,774	81.87	▼2.64
AITC hold		Swing		

=== 2016 ===
2016 West Bengal Legislative Assembly election: Haripal
Party	Candidate	Votes	%	±%
AITC	Becharam Manna	110,899	53.22	▼0.48
CPI(M)	Jogiyananda Mishra	79,424	38.11	▼3.51
BJP	Ramakrishna Pal	11,124	5.34	▲3.06
NOTA	None of the Above	3,526	1.29	New entry
SUCI(C)	Sheikh Rafiuddarajat	1,814	0.87	New entry
JDP	Sukumar Mandi	2,122	0.40	▼0.83
IUC	L. K. Singh	782	0.38	New entry
Majority		31,475	15.11	▲3.05
Turnout		2,08,398	84.51	▼0.89
AITC hold		Swing		

=== 2011 ===
2011 West Bengal Legislative Assembly election: Haripal
Party	Candidate	Votes	%	±%
AITC	Becharam Manna	98,146	53.70	
CPI(M)	Bharati Mukherjee	76,073	41.62	
BJP	Partha Sarathi Banerjee	4,175	2.28	
JDP	Lakshmi Kanta Hansda	2,244	1.23	
PDCI	Mohammad Nizamuddin Sheikh	2,137	1.17	
Majority		22,073	12.08	
Turnout		1,82,775	85.40	
AITC gain from CPI(M)		Swing		

=== 2006 ===
2006 West Bengal Legislative Assembly election: Haripal
Party	Candidate	Votes	%	±%
CPI(M)	Bharati Mukherjee	68,479	52.99	
AITC	Safiul Islam Sarkar	49,424	38.24	
INC	Kashinath Das	6,770	5.24	
Independent	Pradip Kumar Sinha	2,360	1.83	
JDP	Kalipada Murmu	2,193	1.70	
Majority		19,055	14.75	
Turnout				
CPI(M) hold		Swing		

=== 2001 ===
2001 West Bengal Legislative Assembly election: Haripal
Party	Candidate	Votes	%	±%
CPI(M)	Kaliprasad Biswas	71,724	55.52	
AITC	Samiran Mitra	50,708	39.25	
BJP	Krishna Bhattacharjee	4,782	3.70	
Independent	Pradip Kumar Sinha	1,964	1.52	
Majority		21,016	16.27	
Turnout		129,216	81.42	
CPI(M) hold		Swing		

=== 1996 ===
1996 West Bengal Legislative Assembly election: Haripal
Party	Candidate	Votes	%	±%
CPI(M)	Kali Prasad Biswas	63,998	52.91	
INC	Samiran Mitra	53,091	43.89	
BJP	Gobardhan Karmakar	3,110	2.57	
Independent	Surajit Deb Ray	555	0.46	
Independent	Rabindra Nath Chattopadhyay	209	0.17	
Majority		10,907	9.02	
Turnout		122,139	85.57	
CPI(M) hold		Swing		

=== 1991 ===
1991 West Bengal Legislative Assembly election: Haripal
Party	Candidate	Votes	%	±%
CPI(M)	Kali Krasad Biswas	51,410	49.94	
INC	Tusar Sinha Roy	44,328	43.06	
BJP	Ajit Kumar Singha	4,120	4.00	
WPI	Chitta Ranjan Basu	2,867	2.78	
INC(O)	Ghanteswar Das	226	0.22	
Majority		7,082	6.88	
Turnout		104,724	81.78	
CPI(M) hold		Swing		

=== 1987 ===
1987 West Bengal Legislative Assembly election: Haripal
Party	Candidate	Votes	%	±%
CPI(M)	Balai Banerjee	54,480	59.28	
INC	Tusar Sinha Ray	36,384	39.59	
Independent	Satish Mal	612	0.67	
Independent	Proshnto Sarkar	299	0.33	
Independent	Md. Nasiruddin	123	0.13	
Majority		18,096	19.69	
Turnout		93,089	85.42	
CPI(M) hold		Swing		

=== 1982 ===
1982 West Bengal Legislative Assembly election: Haripal
Party	Candidate	Votes	%	±%
CPI(M)	Balai Bandyopadhya	44,472	57.87	
IC(S)	Chandersekhar Bank	29,509	38.40	
Independent	Moulana Md. Ismail	1,989	2.59	
JP	Satish Mal	882	1.15	
Majority		14,963	19.47	
Turnout		78,188	84.88	
CPI(M) hold		Swing		

=== 1977 ===
1977 West Bengal Legislative Assembly election: Haripal
Party	Candidate	Votes	%	±%
CPI(M)	Balai Bandhopadhyay	24,204	48.09	
INC	Chandrasekhar Banik	10,371	20.61	
JP	Sailendra Nath Chattopadhyay	8,090	16.07	
WPI	Chittaranjan Bose	7,027	13.96	
Independent	Satish Chandra Mal	640	1.27	
Majority		13,833	27.48	
Turnout		51,140	68.40	
Swing to CPI(M) from WPI		Swing		

=== 1972 ===
1972 West Bengal Legislative Assembly election: Haripal
Party	Candidate	Votes	%	±%
WPI	Chittaranjan Basu	24,074	50.85	
INC	Chandra Sekhar Bank	23,131	48.86	
Independent	Krishikesh Dey	137	0.29	
Majority		943	1.99	
Turnout		48,214	73.44	
WPI hold		Swing		

=== 1971 ===
1971 West Bengal Legislative Assembly election: Haripal
Party	Candidate	Votes	%	±%
WPI	Chittaranjan Bose	22,594	49.89	
INC	Adhirkumar Ghose	16,829	37.16	
SSP	Amales Chandra Mazumdar	3,148	6.95	
INC(O)	Sailendra Nath Chattopadhy	2,717	6.00	
Majority		5,765	12.73	
Turnout		47,976	73.88	
Swing to WPI from SSP		Swing		

=== 1969 ===
1969 West Bengal Legislative Assembly election: Haripal
Party	Candidate	Votes	%	±%
SSP	Amales Chandra Majumdar	21,594	46.82	
INC	Netai Chandra Bandopadhya	17,449	37.83	
Independent	Sheok Joy Nal Abdin Goyin	6,081	13.18	
PSP	Kalipada Karmakar	723	1.57	
Independent	Sakti Pada Bandury	277	0.60	
Majority		4,145	8.99	
Turnout		47,277	75.92	
SSP hold		Swing		

=== 1967 ===
1967 West Bengal Legislative Assembly election: Haripal
Party	Candidate	Votes	%	±%
SSP	A. C. Majumdar	18,732	44.02	
INC	S. C. Bhattacharyya	16,139	37.93	
AIFB	A. C. Brahmachari	7,678	18.05	
Majority		2,593	6.09	
Turnout		45,881	74.46	
SSP win (new seat)				
