= Ratna De Nag =

Indian politician

Dr. Ratna De Nag

Minister of State (Independent Charge) Government of West Bengal
- In office 10 May 2021 – 2 August 2022
- Governor: Jagdeep Dhankhar
- Chief Minister: Mamata Banerjee
- Department: Environment; Science, Technology and Bio-Technology
- Preceded by: Somen Mahapatra (as Minister of Environment); Bratya Basu (as Minister of Science, Technology and Bio-Technology)
- Succeeded by: Ujjal Biswas (as Minister of Science, Technology and Bio-Technology); Manas Bhunia (as Minister of Environment)

Member of the West Bengal Legislative Assembly
- In office 2 May 2021 – 7 May 2026
- Preceded by: Sk. Amjad Hossain
- Succeeded by: Tusar Kumar Majumdar
- Constituency: Pandua, Hooghly
- In office 2001–2008
- Preceded by: Jyoti Chowdhury
- Succeeded by: Dr. Sudipto Roy
- Constituency: Serampore, Hooghly

Chairperson of Hooghly District Trinamool Congress
- In office 4 July 2019 – 16 August 2021
- President: Dilip Yadav
- Succeeded by: Asima Patra

Member of Parliament, Lok Sabha
- In office 2009–2019
- Preceded by: Rupchand Pal
- Succeeded by: Locket Chatterjee
- Constituency: Hooghly

Personal details
- Born: Ratna Nag; 6 September 1948 (age 78) Serampore, West Bengal, India
- Party: Trinamool Congress
- Children: 2
- As of 11 September, 2009 Source: []

Dr Ratna De Nag (born 6 September 1948) is an Indian politician who has been serving as Minister of State for Environment Science, Technology and Bio-Technology in the Government of West Bengal. She was a member of the 15th Lok Sabha and 16th Lok Sabha from Hooghly (Lok Sabha constituency), which includes the Singur area. She lost the Lok Sabha Elections 2019 to Locket Chatterjee, who was elected as a BJP candidate from the Hooghly Lok Sabha constituency. In the 2021 election, she was elected as the MLA of West Bengal Legislative Assembly from Pandua Vidhan Sabha Constituency.

She is daughter of Gopal Das Nag, who was Labour Minister in the Congress government under Siddhartha Shankar Ray. In 2001 and 2006, she won the assembly election from Sreerampur (Serampore).

A doctor (MBBS and DCH) by profession, she was Member of the Committee on Petroleum and Natural Gas, Lok Sabha. She was a member of the Panel of chairpersons in the 16th Lok Sabha.

She was sworn in as the Minister of State (Independent Charge) as a part of the 21st Council of Ministers for the state of West Bengal under the leadership of Mamata Banerjee with the portfolios of Department of Environment and Department of Science & Technology and Bio-Technology.
