= Indranil Sen =

Indian politician and singer

Indranil Sen ইন্দ্রনীল সেন
- Born: 3 June 1965 (age 61); Kolkata, West Bengal
- Origin: Kolkata, West Bengal, India
- Genres: Jibonmukhi (contemporary), Modern Bengali songs, Rabindra Sangeet, and Folk songs
- Occupations: Politician, Singer, Lyricist, Composer, Film Producer, Actor
- Years active: 1982 - Present
- Labels: Visva-Bharati, Atlantis Music, Prime Music, Sagarika, and T-Series

Indranil Sen

Member of the West Bengal Legislative Assembly
- In office 19 May 2016 – 7 May 2026
- Preceded by: Ashok Kumar Shaw
- Succeeded by: Deepanjan Kumar Guha
- Constituency: Chandannagar

Minister of Tourism of West Bengal
- In office 2023–2026
- Preceded by: Babul Supriyo
- Succeeded by: Shankar Ghosh (politician)
- In office 2021–2023
- Preceded by: Goutam Deb
- Succeeded by: Babul Supriyo

Personal details
- Party: Trinamool Congress

Indranil Sen is an Indian politician, Bengali artist, actor, and film producer from West Bengal. He is former minister of state of the Tourism Department and MoS (I/C) of the Technical Education, Training & Skill Development Department under the Government of West Bengal September 2023 to May 2026. He was a member of the West Bengal Legislative Assembly from the Chandannagar Assembly constituency from 2016 to 2026 on the symbol of Trinamool Congress, a party led by Mamata Banerjee. He was appointed the chairperson of West Bengal Tourism Development Corporation in 2023.

Although he is primarily a singer of Indian Bengali songs, he is renowned for his work in modern Bengali music, Rabindra Sangeet, and folk songs. He has received numerous awards, including the BFJA Award for Best Male Playback Singer. He was defeated heavily in the 2026 West Bengal Assembly Elections and thereafter lost his seat. He was arrested on 28 October 2026 immediately after leaving the CGO Complex.

== Early life ==
Indranil Sen was born on 3 June 1965 in Kolkata, West Bengal to Prodyut Kumar Sen.

He has completed his senior secondary from the New Alipore Multipurpose School, Kolkata affiliated under West Bengal Council of Higher Secondary Education in 1983 and Diploma in Aircraft Maintenance Engineering from the Hindustan Institute of Engineering Technology, Chennai in 1986.

== Controversy ==
He was arrested in the 2021 West Bengal Durga Puja Pass scam by Kolkata Police, immediately after interrogation by Enforcement Directorate.
