= Pandua Assembly constituency =

Pandua
- Constituency No. 192 for the West Bengal Legislative Assembly
- Interactive Map Outlining Pandua Assembly Constituency

Constituency details
- Country: India
- Region: East India
- State: West Bengal
- District: Hooghly
- Lok Sabha constituency: Hooghly
- Established: 1962
- Total electors: 207,112
- Reservation: None

Member of Legislative Assembly
- 18th West Bengal Legislative Assembly
- Incumbent Tushar Kumar Majumdar
- Party: BJP
- Alliance: NDA
- Elected year: 2026

Pandua Assembly constituency is an assembly constituency in Hooghly district in the Indian state of West Bengal.

== Overview ==
As per orders of the Delimitation Commission, No. 192 Pandua Assembly constituency is composed of the following: Pandua community development block.

Pandua Assembly constituency is part of No. 28 Hooghly Lok Sabha constituency. It was earlier part of Katwa Lok Sabha constituency.

== Members of the Legislative Assembly ==
Year	Name	Party
1962	Radhanath Das	Indian National Congress
1967	R. Kundu	Indian National Congress
1969	Deb Narayan Chakraborty	Communist Party of India (Marxist)
1971	Deb Narayan Chakraborty	Communist Party of India (Marxist)
1972	Sailendra Chattopadhyay	Indian National Congress
1977	Deb Narayan Chakraborty	Communist Party of India (Marxist)
1982	Deb Narayan Chakraborty	Communist Party of India (Marxist)
1987	Deb Narayan Chakraborty	Communist Party of India (Marxist)
1991	Deb Narayan Chakraborty	Communist Party of India (Marxist)
1996	Sheikh Majed Ali	Communist Party of India (Marxist)
2001	Sheikh Majed Ali	Communist Party of India (Marxist)
2006	Sheikh Majed Ali	Communist Party of India (Marxist)
2011	Sheikh Amjad Hossain	Communist Party of India (Marxist)
2016	Sheikh Amjad Hossain	Communist Party of India (Marxist)
2021	Ratna De Nag	Trinamool Congress
2026	Tushar Kumar Majumdar	Bharatiya Janata Party

== Election results ==
Vote share of Winning candidates
2026	43.36%
2021	45.99%
2016	43.68%
2011	46.64%
2006	60.62%
2001	53.56%
1996	54.75%
1991	58.73%
1987	59.90%
1982	59.69%
1977	61.57%
1972	58.96%
1971	56.38%
1969	57.93%
1967	45.16%
1962	55.15%

=== 2026 ===
2026 West Bengal Legislative Assembly election: Pandua
Party	Candidate	Votes	%	±%
BJP	Tushar Kumar Majumdar	101,349	43.36	▲11.61
AITC	Samir Chakraborty	96,121	41.13	▼4.86
CPI(M)	Sheikh Amjad Hossain	27,557	11.79	▼6.75
INC	Sanatan Mandi	2,134	0.91	New entry
NOTA	None of the above	1,651	0.71	▼0.26
Majority		5,228	2.23	▼12.01
Turnout		233,718	93.78	▲11.1
BJP gain from AITC		Swing		

=== 2021 ===
2021 West Bengal Legislative Assembly election: Pandua
Party	Candidate	Votes	%	±%
AITC	Ratna De Nag	102,874	45.99	▲2.97
BJP	Partha Sharma	71,016	31.75	▲23.59
CPI(M)	Sheikh Amjad Hossain	41,474	18.54	▼25.14
NOTA	None of the above	2,164	0.97	▼0.33
Majority		31,858	14.24	▲13.58
Turnout		223,664	82.68	▼2.79
AITC gain from CPI(M)		Swing		

=== 2016 ===
2016 West Bengal Legislative Assembly election: Pandua
Party	Candidate	Votes	%	±%
CPI(M)	Sheikh Amjad Hossain	91,489	43.68	▼2.96
AITC	Syed Rahim Nabi	90,097	43.02	▼3.40
BJP	Ashok Bhattacharya	17,081	8.16	▲5.25
NOTA	None of the Above	2,731	1.30	New entry
IND	Sheikh Amjad Hossain	2,477	1.18	New entry
PDS	Abdul Goni Sarkar	1,289	0.53	New entry
BSP	Lakshmi Narayan Bauldas	1,852	0.88	▲0.12
CPI(ML)L	Niranjan Bag	1,759	0.84	▼1.34
Majority		1,392	0.66	▲0.44
Turnout		2,09,433	85.47	▼2.25
CPI(M) hold		Swing		

=== 2011 ===
2011 West Bengal Legislative Assembly election: Pandua
Party	Candidate	Votes	%	±%
CPI(M)	Sheikh Amjad Hossain	84,830	46.64	▼13.98
AITC	Nargis Begum	84,433	46.42	▲16.38
BJP	Debaprasad Chakraborty	5,297	2.91	
CPI(ML)L	Subhashish Chattopadhyay	3,956	2.18	▼0.96
BSP	Lakshmi Narayan Bauldas	1,379	0.76	▼0.90
JDP	Kalidasi Hembram	1,279	0.70	
JD(U)	Dilip Kumar Talukdar Chowdhury	704	0.39	
Majority		397	0.22	
Turnout		1,81,878	87.72	
CPI(M) hold		Swing		

=== 2006 ===
2006 West Bengal Legislative Assembly election: Pandua
Party	Candidate	Votes	%	±%
CPI(M)	Sekh Majed Ali	90,516	60.62	▲7.06
AITC	Alam Kazi Rowshan	44,858	30.04	▼11.53
PDS	Geni Sarkar	6,774	4.54	▲2.90
CPI(ML)L	Niranjan Bag	4,691	3.14	▲1.83
BSP	Oyadud Abdul	2,476	1.66	▲0.57
Majority		45,658	30.58	
Turnout		149,316		
CPI(M) hold		Swing		

=== 2001 ===
2001 West Bengal Legislative Assembly election: Pandua
Party	Candidate	Votes	%	±%
CPI(M)	Ali Sk. Majed	76,613	53.56	▼1.19
AITC	Sailen Chattopadhyay	59,466	41.57	
PDS	Molla Abdul Sofiuddin	2,339	1.64	
CPI(ML)L	Adhikari Sajal	1,873	1.31	▲0.44
BSP	Lakshminarayan Baul Das	1,560	1.09	▲0.69
LJP	Pradip Sarkar	1,185	0.83	
Majority		17,147	11.99	
Turnout		143,164	77.93	
CPI(M) hold		Swing		

=== 1996 ===
1996 West Bengal Legislative Assembly election: Pandua
Party	Candidate	Votes	%	±%
CPI(M)	Ali Sheikh Majed	77,911	54.75	▼3.98
INC	Madhusudan Banerjee	52,801	37.11	▲7.95
BJP	Bidur Pramanik	7,314	5.14	▼5.53
IND	Sheikh Moniruddin	1,702	1.20	
CPI(ML)L	Gopal Ghosh	1,242	0.87	
BSP	Lakshmi Narayan Bouldas	575	0.40	▼0.09
IND	Madan Mohan Hansda	546	0.38	
IND	Ansar Ali	202	0.14	
Majority		25,110	17.64	▼11.93
Turnout		145,061	85.37	
CPI(M) hold		Swing		

=== 1991 ===
1991 West Bengal Legislative Assembly election: Pandua
Party	Candidate	Votes	%	±%
CPI(M)	Deb Narayan Chakraborty	71,879	58.73	
INC	Hrishikesh Ghosh	35,693	29.16	
BJP	Bidur Pramanik	13,058	10.67	
IND	Nirai Hembram	700	0.57	
BSP	Milan Mondal	602	0.49	
IND	K. Buddha Ruidas	451	0.37	
Majority		36,186	29.57	
Turnout		124,507	81.36	
CPI(M) hold		Swing		

=== 1987 ===
1987 West Bengal Legislative Assembly election: Pandua
Party	Candidate	Votes	%	±%
CPI(M)	Deb Narayan Chakraborty	62,316	59.90	
INC	Hrishikesh Ghosh	41,046	39.46	
IND	Netai Bhattacherjee	668	0.64	
Majority		21,270	20.44	
Turnout		105,639	81.72	
CPI(M) hold		Swing		

=== 1982 ===
1982 West Bengal Legislative Assembly election: Pandua
Party	Candidate	Votes	%	±%
CPI(M)	Chakraborty Deb Narayan	52,605	59.69	
INC	Haren Singha Roy	34,727	39.40	
IND	Rampada Ghosh	804	0.91	
Majority		17,878	20.29	
Turnout		89,754	83.75	
CPI(M) hold		Swing		

=== 1977 ===
1977 West Bengal Legislative Assembly election: Pandua
Party	Candidate	Votes	%	±%
CPI(M)	Deb Narayan Chakrabarty	32,804	61.57	
INC	Sailendra Chattopadhyay	13,947	26.18	
JP	Hamidul Hoque	5,169	9.70	
IND	Sri Dibendu Kumar Kundu	1,169	2.19	
IND	Ram Dayal Ghosh	192	0.36	
Majority		18,857	35.39	
Turnout		54,276	63.49	
CPI(M) gain from INC		Swing		

=== 1972 ===
1972 West Bengal Legislative Assembly election: Pandua
Party	Candidate	Votes	%	±%
INC	Sailendra Chaootpadhyay	29,211	58.96	
CPI(M)	Deb Narayan Chakraborty	20,329	41.04	
Majority		8,882	17.92	
Turnout		50,663	69.08	
Swing to INC from CPI(M)		Swing		

=== 1971 ===
1971 West Bengal Legislative Assembly election: Pandua
Party	Candidate	Votes	%	±%
CPI(M)	Deb Narayan Chakrabarty	28,949	56.38	
BAC	Sailendra Chottopadhya	18,274	35.59	
INC	Anwar Hossain Molla	3,223	6.28	
JKP	Mangala Hemram	898	1.75	
Majority		10,675	20.79	
Turnout		54,374	75.67	
CPI(M) hold		Swing		

=== 1969 ===
1969 West Bengal Legislative Assembly election: Pandua
Party	Candidate	Votes	%	±%
CPI(M)	Deb Narayan Chakrabarty	27,590	57.93	
INC	Kundu Raj Narayan	19,756	41.48	
NDF	Samarendra Roy Chowdhary	279	0.59	
Majority		7,834	16.45	
Turnout		48,877	71.65	
Swing to CPI(M) from INC		Swing		

=== 1967 ===
1967 West Bengal Legislative Assembly election: Pandua
Party	Candidate	Votes	%	±%
INC	R. Kundu	19,507	45.16	
CPI(M)	M. R. Mandal	16,277	37.69	
BAC	S. Chattopadhyay	6,780	15.70	
IND	K. M. Ali	628	1.45	
Majority		3,230	7.47	
Turnout		45,750	68.47	
INC hold		Swing		

=== 1962 ===
1962 West Bengal Legislative Assembly election: Pandua (SC)
Party	Candidate	Votes	%	±%
INC	Radha Nath Das	18,365	55.15	
CPI	Basudev Shee	11,998	36.03	
IND	Bata Krishna Mondal	1,707	5.13	
IND	Kartic Chanra Roy	1,232	3.70	
Majority		6,367	19.12	
Turnout		35,444	53.88	
INC win (new seat)				
