= Abul Bashar =

Indian writer

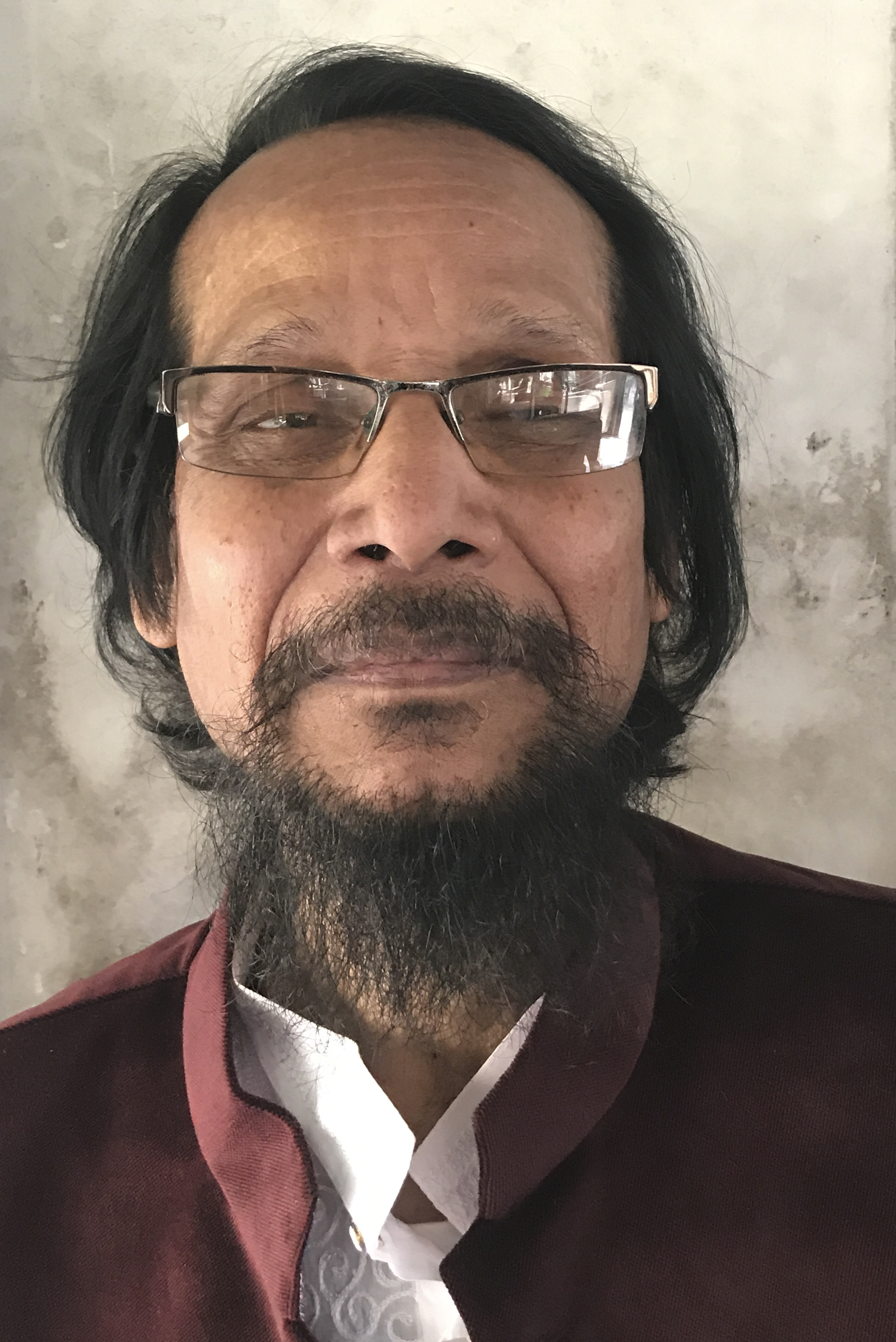
- Bashar in February 2018
- Born: 1 January 1951; Islampur, Murshidabad, West Bengal
- Education: University of Calcutta
- Occupation: Writer
- Spouse: Sahana Bibi
- Writing career
- Language: Bengali
- Subject: Commerce
- Notable works: (Phool Bou) Jhor Uprano Dalpala Vanga aar ek ritu.; (Madhabsundori)

Abul Bashar (Bengali: আবুল বাশার) is an Indian Bengali writer.

== Early life and career ==
He was born in 1951 at Hasanpur, Islampur, in Murshidabad district. His poetry collection 'Jor Upradano Dalpala Bhanga Aar Ek Ritu' was published in 1971. He passed from University of Calcutta. He made his place in Bengali literature with his first novel, Phoolbou.

== Recognition ==
Bashar won Banga Bhushan in 2019. Bashar was chief guest for Inauguration at Kolkata International Book Fair in 2025.

== Select bibliography ==
- Agnibalaka
- Phool Bou 1988
- Marusvarga 1991
- Bhorer Proshuti
- Saidabai
- Simar
- Mati chere jai
- Surer Sampan
- Vetore Aste Dao
- Sporser Baire
- Akaslina
- Jol, Mati, Aguner Upakkhayan
- Madhabsundori
- Naram Hridoyer Chinho
- Pobitro Asukh
- Paanikayed
- Anna Nakshi
- Dharmer Grahon
- Suchitra Sen
- Ekti Khame Bhora Kahini
- Bhor Poati Tara

== Adaptation in Movie ==
- Sitara (2019 film)

== Awards ==
- Ananda Purashkar, (1988)
- Sahitya-Shiromoni Purashkar (1993)
- Bankim Smriti Purashkar (2008).
- Banga Bhushan, (2022)
- Guild Lifetime Literary Award,(2025)
