= 2021 West Bengal Durga Puja Pass scam =

Ongoing festival scam in India

West Bengal Durga Puja Pass scam is an ongoing scam related to Durga Puja festival of the state of West Bengal, India since 2021. The scam was revealed following the arrest of Indranil Sen, Trinamool Congress leader, former MLA and former Cabinet Minister in Government of West Bengal in the cabinet of Mamata Banerjee, then Chief Minister of West Bengal in October 2026.

== Background ==
Between 2022 and 2025, MassArt Society established shortly after the Durga Puja gained UNESCO Intangible Cultural Heritage status in 2021—allegedly collected money by selling passes for "preview shows" promising privileged VIP entry to Durga Puja pandals.

The organizers allegedly falsely projected the initiative as officially sponsored by or directly affiliated with UNESCO, despite having no commercial or legal agreements with the UN body.

Central agencies (including the Enforcement Directorate (ED) and Central Bureau of Investigation (CBI)) and state police estimate that around INR 50 crore to 60 crore was siphoned off through corporate branding, sponsorship money, and pass sales, with funds allegedly diverted for personal use.

Following the rejection of his anticipatory bail plea by the Calcutta High Court, Sen was questioned by the Enforcement Directorate (ED) and subsequently taken into custody by the Kolkata Police. He was arrested with 15 days of custody.

== Aftermath and reaction ==
Following the arrest of Sen, Chief Minister of West Bengal, Suvendu Adhikari launched a direct attack on TMC leadership, targeting Sen's close proximity to Mamata Banerjee. He alleged that Sen could not have operated the multi-crore scheme alone and claimed that the proceeds of crime were shared higher up. Calling the action merely "biscuit with tea" and predicting bigger arrests to follow, Adhikari described it as an example of institutional corruption within the party. He also noted Sen's past political affiliations with CPI(M)-linked entities before joining TMC.

TMC MP Abhishek Banerjee claimed that BJP is trying to harass all the leaders who are opposing Adhikari's government and to please Adhikari through state machinery.

== See also ==
- 2022 West Bengal School Service Commission recruitment scam
