= Tusar Kumar Majumdar =

Indian politician in West Bengal

Member of the West Bengal Legislative Assembly
- Incumbent
- Assumed office May 2026
- Preceded by: Ratna De
- Constituency: Pandua

Personal details
- Party: Bharatiya Janata Party
- Spouse: Suparna Majumder
- Parent: Lalchand Majumdar
- Occupation: Rural Medicinal Practitioner
- Profession: Politician

Tusar Kumar Majumdar (Bengali: তুষার কুমার মজুমদার) is an Indian politician from West Bengal. He is a member of West Bengal Legislative Assembly, from Pandua Assembly constituency. He is a member of Bharatiya Janata Party.

== Early life and education ==
Majumder is from Hooghly district of West Bengal. His qualification is H.S Passed from Pandua Sashi Bhusan High School, affiliated to West Bengal Council of Higher Secondary Education in the year of 2002.

== Political career ==
He is a member of West Bengal Legislative Assembly, from Pandua Assembly constituency.

=== Electoral performance ===
West Bengal Legislative Assembly
Year	Constituency	Party	Votes	%	Opponent	Party	Votes	%	Margin	Result
2026	Pandua	BJP	1,01,349	43.36	Samir Chakraborty	AITC	96,121	41.13	5,228	Won

== See also ==
- 2026 West Bengal Legislative Assembly election
- List of chief ministers of West Bengal
- West Bengal Legislative Assembly
