= Jagatnagar Kalibari =

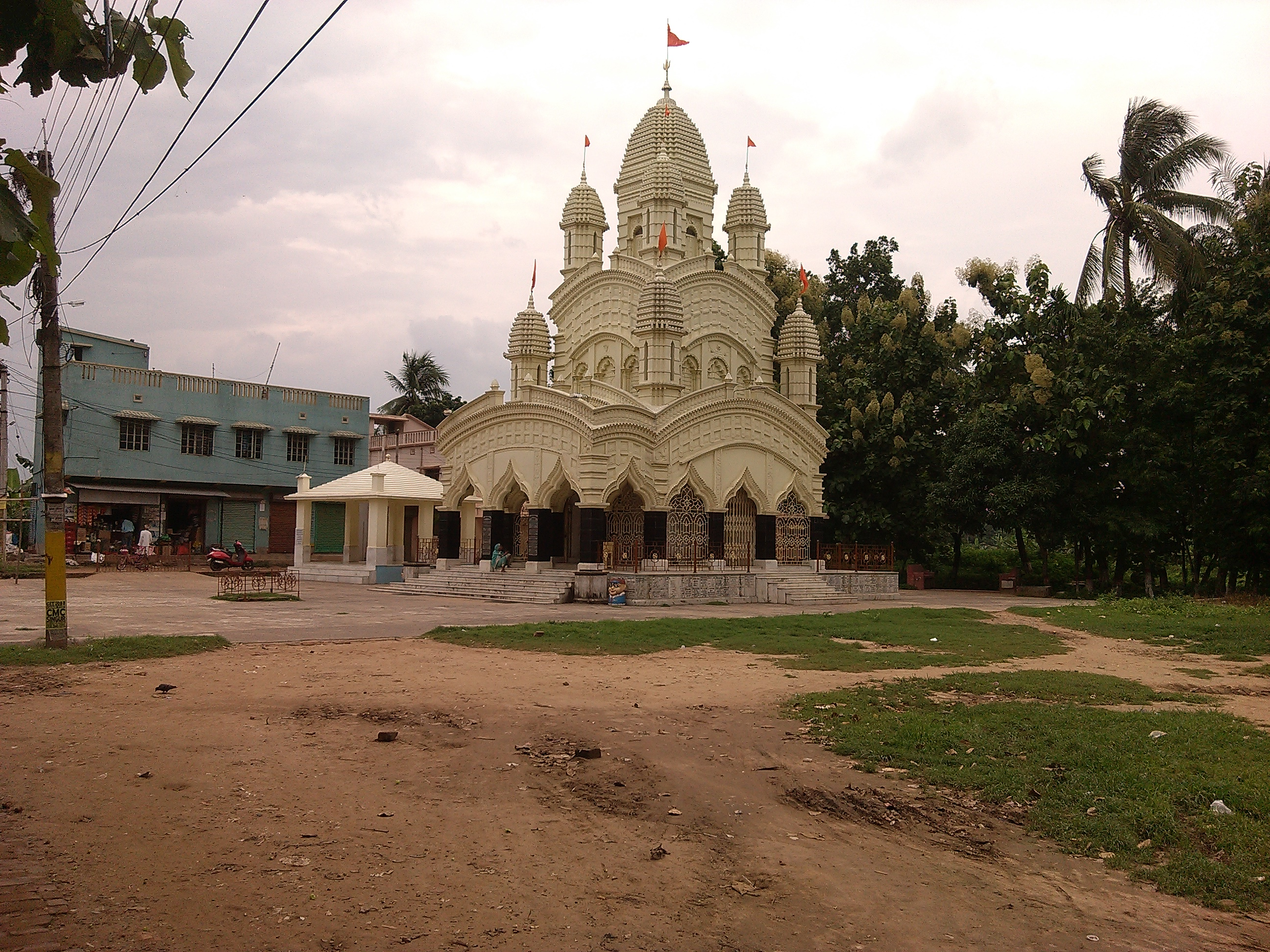
- Jagatnagar Kalibari

- Location in West Bengal

Religion
- Affiliation: Hinduism
- District: Hooghly
- Deity: আনন্দময়ী কালী মা
- Festival: Kali Puja

Location
- Location: Jagatnagar, Singur
- State: West Bengal
- Country: India
- Coordinates: 22.7840091°N 88.2213113°E

Architecture
- Type: Bengal architecture
- Temple: 1:मुख्य मंदिर(Main Temple)

Jagatnagar Kalibari (Bengali: জগৎনগর কালীবাড়ি) is a Hindu temple located in Jagatnagar near Singur in Hooghly district, dedicated to goddess Kali. It is situated 34 km away from Kolkata.

== See also ==
- Belur Math
- Dakshineswar Kali Temple
