= Tapan Dasgupta =

West Bengal politician

President, Hooghly District Trinamool Congress
- In office 24 July 2005 – 4 July 2019
- Preceded by: Akbar Ali Khondkar
- Succeeded by: Dilip Yadav

Member of the West Bengal Legislative Assembly
- In office 20 May 2011 – 4 May 2026
- Preceded by: New seat
- Succeeded by: Swaraj Ghosh
- Constituency: Saptagram, Hooghly

Minister of Agriculture Marketing Government of West Bengal
- In office 20 May 2016 – 5 May 2021
- Governor: Keshari Nath Tripathi Jagdeep Dhankhar
- Chief Minister: Mamata Banerjee
- Preceded by: Rabindranath Bhattacharjee
- Succeeded by: Becharam Manna

Personal details
- Party: Trinamool Congress

Tapan Dasgupta is an Indian politician who served as minister of Agriculture Marketing in West Bengal under the ministry of Mamata Banerjee from 2016 till 2021. Being a member of Trinamool Congress, he is currently serving as a member of West Bengal Legislative Assembly from Saptagram constituency since 2011.

== Early life and education ==
Dasgupta was graduate student of Rishi Bankim College, Naihati. He completed his studies and did B.A. in Calcutta University in 1975.

== Controversies ==
Mamata Banerjee, the Chief Minister of West Bengal, took action in July 2019 to remove minister Dasgupta from his position as party president of the Hooghly district unit. This came just a few days after his name was mentioned in connection with the kickback scandal. Dilip Yadav, a local leader, has taken over from Dasgupta in this role.
