= Chandannagar Assembly constituency =

Chandannagar
- Constituency No. 189 for the West Bengal Legislative Assembly
- Interactive Map Outlining Chandannagar Assembly Constituency

Constituency details
- Country: India
- Region: East India
- State: West Bengal
- District: Hooghly
- Lok Sabha constituency: Hooghly
- Established: 1957
- Total electors: 198,602
- Reservation: None

Member of Legislative Assembly
- 18th West Bengal Legislative Assembly
- Incumbent Deepanjan Kumar Guha
- Party: BJP
- Alliance: NDA
- Elected year: 2026

Chandannagar Assembly constituency is an assembly constituency in Hooghly district in the Indian state of West Bengal.

== Overview ==
As per orders of the Delimitation Commission, No. 189 Chandanagar Assembly constituency is composed of the following: Chandannagar Municipal Corporation and Bhadreswar Municipality.

Chandannagar Assembly constituency is part of No. 28 Hooghly Lok Sabha constituency.

== Members of the Legislative Assembly ==
Year	Name	Party
Chandernagore
1957	Hirendra Kumar Chattopadhyay	Independent politician
1962	Bhabani Mukherjee	Communist Party of India
1967	Bhabani Mukherjee	Communist Party of India (Marxist)
1969	Bhabani Mukherjee	Communist Party of India (Marxist)
1971	Bhabani Mukherjee	Communist Party of India (Marxist)
1972	Bhabani Mukherjee	Communist Party of India (Marxist)
1977	Bhabani Mukherjee	Communist Party of India (Marxist)
1982	Bhabani Mukherjee	Communist Party of India (Marxist)
1987	Sandhya Chattopadhyay	Communist Party of India (Marxist)
1991	Sandhya Chattopadhyay	Communist Party of India (Marxist)
1996	Kamal Mukherjee	Indian National Congress
2001	Kamal Mukherjee	Indian National Congress
2006	Siba Prasad Bandopadhyay	Communist Party of India (Marxist)
Chandannagar
2011	Ashok Kumar Shaw	Trinamool Congress
2016	Indranil Sen	Trinamool Congress
2021	Indranil Sen	Trinamool Congress
2026	Deepanjan Kumar Guha	Bharatiya Janata Party

== Election results ==
Vote share of Winning candidates
2026	46.16%
2021	47.63%
2016	44.83%
2011	60.76%
2006	45.22%
2001	48.04%
1996	49.93%
1991	44.77%
1987	52.54%
1982	50.29%
1977	67.28%
1972	49.37%
1971	54.86%
1969	57.97%
1967	54.85%
1962	50.06%
1957	51.94%

=== 2026 ===
2026 West Bengal Legislative Assembly election: Chandannagar
Party	Candidate	Votes	%	±%
BJP	Deepanjan Kumar Guha	86,273	46.16	▲15.56
AITC	Indranil Sen	72,832	38.97	▼8.66
CPI(M)	Monish Panda	22,760	12.18	▼6.32
INC	Ratan Golder	1,112	0.20	▼3.32
NOTA	None of the above	2,016	1.08	▼0.58
Majority		13,441	7.19	▼9.84
Turnout		186,909	91.71	▲12.35
BJP gain from AITC		Swing		

=== 2021 ===
2021 West Bengal Legislative Assembly election: Chandannagar
Party	Candidate	Votes	%	±%
AITC	Indranil Sen	86,778	47.63	▲2.80
BJP	Deepanjan Kumar Guha	55,749	30.60	▲22.77
CPI(M)	Gautam Sarkar	33,702	18.50	▼25.08
NOTA	None of the above	3,023	1.66	▼0.62
Majority		31,029	17.03	▲15.78
Turnout		182,178	79.36	▲0.45
AITC hold		Swing		

=== 2016 ===
2016 West Bengal Legislative Assembly election: Chandannagar
Party	Candidate	Votes	%	±%
AITC	Indranil Sen	75,727	44.83	▼15.93
CPI(M)	Gautam Sarkar	73,613	43.58	▲9.94
BJP	Tandra Bhattacharjee	13,233	7.83	▲4.61
NOTA	None of the Above	3,853	2.28	New entry
Independent	Gautam Sarkar	1,477	0.87	New entry
SUCI(C)	Milan Rakshit	1,002	0.59	New entry
Majority		2,114	1.25	▼25.87
Turnout		1,68,905	78.91	▼0.29
AITC hold		Swing		

=== 2011 ===
2011 West Bengal Legislative Assembly election: Chandannagar
Party	Candidate	Votes	%	±%
AITC	Ashok Kumar Shaw	96,430	60.76	
CPI(M)	Siba Prosad Bandyopadhyay	53,391	33.64	
BJP	Satya Bhushan Pathak	5,109	3.22	
Independent	Subodh Ghoshal	3,780	2.38	
Majority		43,039	27.12	
Turnout		1,58,710	79.20	
AITC gain from CPI(M)		Swing		

=== 2006 ===
2006 West Bengal Legislative Assembly election: Chandernagore
Party	Candidate	Votes	%	±%
CPI(M)	Sibaprosad Bandyopadhyay	63,793	45.22	
AITC	Ram Chakrabortty	46,687	33.09	
INC	Kamal Mukherjee	24,891	17.64	
Independent	Asima Maity	2,895	2.05	
BSP	Feku Ram	2,031	1.44	
Majority		17,106	12.13	
Turnout		141,080		
Swing to CPI(M) from INC		Swing		

=== 2001 ===
2001 West Bengal Legislative Assembly election: Chandernagore
Party	Candidate	Votes	%	±%
INC	Kamal Mukherjee	65,590	48.04	
CPI(M)	Ratan Lal Dasgupta	62,504	45.78	
BJP	Devadatta Dey	5,881	4.31	
Independent	Vijay Kumar Mahato	2,543	1.86	
Majority		3,086	2.26	
Turnout		136,548	73.33	
INC hold		Swing		

=== 1996 ===
1996 West Bengal Legislative Assembly election: Chandernagore
Party	Candidate	Votes	%	±%
INC	Kamal Mukherjee	69,565	49.93	
CPI(M)	Sandhya Chattopadhyay	62,531	44.88	
BJP	Tandra Bhattacharjee	5,223	3.75	
Independent	Shambhu Das	745	0.53	
Independent	Nani Gopal Bhattacharya	423	0.30	
Independent	Dibyendu Guha	389	0.28	
Independent	Deb Kumar Shil	284	0.20	
Independent	Madan Mohan Roy	160	0.11	
Majority		7,034	5.05	
Turnout		141,561	79.66	
Swing to INC from CPI(M)		Swing		

=== 1991 ===
1991 West Bengal Legislative Assembly election: Chandernagore
Party	Candidate	Votes	%	±%
CPI(M)	Sandhya Chatterjee	51,859	44.77	
INC	Kamal Mukherjee	49,171	42.45	
BJP	Sunil Kumar Roy	13,944	12.04	
Independent	Milan Rakshit	524	0.45	
INC(O)	Madan Mohan Roy	346	0.30	
Majority		2,688	2.32	
Turnout		118,473	72.12	
CPI(M) hold		Swing		

=== 1987 ===
1987 West Bengal Legislative Assembly election: Chandernagore
Party	Candidate	Votes	%	±%
CPI(M)	Sandhya Chattopadhyay	53,816	52.54	
INC	Kamal Kumar Mukherjee	47,743	46.61	
Independent	Some Nath Sheth	519	0.51	
Independent	Snehamoy Dutta	344	0.34	
Majority		6,073	5.93	
Turnout		103,972	76.62	
CPI(M) hold		Swing		

=== 1982 ===
1982 West Bengal Legislative Assembly election: Chandernagore
Party	Candidate	Votes	%	±%
CPI(M)	Bhabani Mukherjee	42,363	50.29	
INC	Indumati Bhattacharyya	40,347	47.90	
BJP	Tripti Ratan Dutta	1,524	1.81	
Majority		2,016	2.39	
Turnout		86,096	72.56	
CPI(M) hold		Swing		

=== 1977 ===
1977 West Bengal Legislative Assembly election: Chandernagore
Party	Candidate	Votes	%	±%
CPI(M)	Bhabani Mukherjee	40,681	67.28	
INC	Asit Mukhopadhyay	11,100	18.36	
JP	Suprabhat Basu	8,280	13.69	
Independent	Prakash Chandra Das	404	0.67	
Majority		29,581	48.92	
Turnout		61,373	58.83	
CPI(M) hold		Swing		

=== 1972 ===
1972 West Bengal Legislative Assembly election: Chandernagore
Party	Candidate	Votes	%	±%
CPI(M)	Bhabani Mukherjee	28,366	49.37	
INC	Beri Shaw	28,327	49.30	
INC	Prokash Chandra Das	764	1.33	
Majority		39	0.07	
Turnout		58,580	68.58	
CPI(M) hold		Swing		

=== 1971 ===
1971 West Bengal Legislative Assembly election: Chandernagore
Party	Candidate	Votes	%	±%
CPI(M)	Bhabani Mukherjee	31,322	54.86	
INC	Bepin Behari Sav	18,734	32.81	
Independent	Dinesh Ranjan Mukherjee	4,813	8.43	
INC(O)	Suprobhat Basu	1,994	3.49	
Independent	Kiran Chandra Ghose	234	0.41	
Majority		12,588	22.05	
Turnout		59,165	70.32	
CPI(M) hold		Swing		

=== 1969 ===
1969 West Bengal Legislative Assembly election: Chandernagore
Party	Candidate	Votes	%	±%
CPI(M)	Bhabani Mukherjee	32,572	57.97	
INC	Brahma Baran Ghose	22,381	39.83	
ABJS	P. K. Chakkarborty	683	1.22	
PBI	Gour Gopal Banerjee	550	0.98	
Majority		10,191	18.14	
Turnout		57,175	73.11	
CPI(M) hold		Swing		

=== 1967 ===
1967 West Bengal Legislative Assembly election: Chandernagore
Party	Candidate	Votes	%	±%
CPI(M)	B. Mukherjee	29,830	54.85	
INC	S. Bandyopadhyay	23,073	42.43	
Independent	P. Ghosh	881	1.62	
Independent	P. C. Das	597	1.10	
Majority		6,757	12.42	
Turnout		55,985	75.40	
Swing to CPI(M) from CPI		Swing		

=== 1962 ===
1962 West Bengal Legislative Assembly election: Chandernagore
Party	Candidate	Votes	%	±%
CPI	Bhabani Mukhapadhyay	20,532	50.06	
INC	Tarak Das Dey	19,689	48.01	
PSP	Abu Syeed	792	1.93	
Majority		843	2.05	
Turnout		42,420	64.83	
Swing to CPI from Independent		Swing		

=== 1957 ===
1957 West Bengal Legislative Assembly election: Chandernagore
Party	Candidate	Votes	%	±%
Independent	Hirendra Kumar Chattopadhyay	18,588	51.94	
INC	Prabhat Kumar Palit	16,052	44.85	
Independent	Prakash Chandra Das	1,147	3.21	
Majority		2,536	7.09	
Turnout		35,787	69.54	
Independent win (new seat)				
