= Football Lovers' Day =

Commemorative day in India

- Date: 16 August 1980
- Time: 14:00 - 16:10 IST
- Venue: Eden Gardens
- Location: Kolkata, India; 22°33′52″N 88°20′36″E
- Type: Stampede
- Cause: Riot inside stadium
- Outcome: Suspension of Calcutta Football League and IFA Shield in 1980
- Deaths: 16
- Injuries: 100+

Football Lovers' Day is observed in memorial to be the most tragic day in Indian football history, when 16 football fans died due to a stampede and riot inside the Eden Gardens stadium in Kolkata on 16 August 1980 on the occasion of a Kolkata Derby match in the Calcutta Football League.

== Events leading up to the disaster ==
The Kolkata Derby has been an eternal rivalry between the two oldest clubs in Indian football—Mohun Bagan and East Bengal—and has been featured on the list of FIFA's Classic Rivalries. The fanaticism around football in Kolkata in the 1970s was unparalleled and the Bangal-Ghoti rivalry was the pinnacle of football rivalries in Asia, as football became an escape from the political turmoil of the 70s in Kolkata.

East Bengal had the better of their arch-rivals in the better part of the previous decade by winning almost all trophies between 1970 and 1975. Mohun Bagan were fast growing back into their old stature, winning the Triple Crown in 1978. Just a few months back, the two teams had a bitter clash in the 1980 Federation Cup final, which ended 1-1; both were declared joint winners. Both sets of fans were eager to get the bragging rights and the tempers were already high before the kick-off in the ill-fated Kolkata Derby.

Mohun Bagan was led by Compton Dutta while the East Bengal team was led by Satyajit Mitra. The match began in high intensity as Dilip Palit, who started in an un-orthodox right back position for the Red and Golds and committed a rash foul on Bidesh Bose, who was full of trickery on the left flank, in the 11th minute of the game. The referee, Sudhin Chatterjee, didn't produce a card for Dilip Palit, which was a shock for all. After the break, a similar incident happened in the 57th minute and Bidesh Ranjan Bose retaliated, which led the referee to give marching orders to the Mohun Bagan left winger while Dilip Palit was again left unpunished. The referee committed another blunder when he gave Dilip Palit marching orders a few moments later as an act of balancing his previous decision. This started a riot in the stadium among both sets of fans.

=== Confrontation ===
Usually, the East Bengal and Mohun Bagan fans are seated in separate galleries so that any kind of fan riots are prevented. However, on that day, both sets of fans were made to sit together in the stands. In the absence of segregation and inadequate police protection in the stands, the riots spread and people started running towards exits to save themselves. Young fans jumped off the high stands onto concrete floors to save themselves while many tried to flee through the narrow gates, which led many to fall down. It caused an inevitable stampede that took the lives of 16 football fans.

=== The match ===
The players and the officials did not have any idea of what was happening in the stands. The game was stopped for a few moments after the double red cards and the game went on, where both teams played with 10 men and the game finished at 0–0.

==== Match details ====
16 August 1980

East Bengal	0–0	Mohun Bagan

Eden Gardens, Kolkata
Attendance: 70,000
Referee: Sudhin Chatterjee (West Bengal)

East Bengal	Mohun Bagan

GK	(India) Dilip Paul
RB	(India) Dilip Palit		(red card) 60'
CB	(India) Monoranjan Bhattacharya
CB	(India) Sudhir Karmakar
LB	(India) Satyajit Mitra (c)
CM	(India) Mohammed Habib	Substituted off
MF	(India) Samar Bhattacharyya
MF	(Iran) Mahmood Khabaji	Substituted off
MF	(India) Tapan Das
FW	(Iran) Jamshid Nassiri
FW	(Iran) Majid Bishkar
Substitutes:
GK	(India) Nasir Ahmed
DF	(India) Kajal Chatterjee	Substituted on
MF	(India) Harjinder Singh	Substituted on
DF	(India) Md. Najib
DF	(India) Subhash Roy
MF	(India) Amit Guha
MF	(India) Somnath Banerjee
MF	(India) Latifuddin
MF	(India) Sumit Bagchi
FW	(India) Tomas Mathuz
FW	(India) Bibhas Sarkar
Coach:
(India) Pradip Kumar Banerjee

GK	(India) Sibaji Bannerjee
DF	(India) Compton Dutta (c)
DF	(India) Subrata Bhattacharya
DF	(India) Pradip Chowdhury
DF	(India) Shyamal Bannerjee
MF	(India) Goutam Sarkar
CM	(India) Prasun Banerjee
RW	(India) Manas Bhattacharyya
FW	(India) Mihir Bose
FW	(India) Xavier Payas	Substituted off
LW	(India) Bidesh Bose		(red card) 57'
Substitutes:
GK	(India) Jagadish Ghosh
DF	(India) Pratap Ghosh
DF	(India) Francis D'Souza
MF	(India) Ulaganathan	Substituted on
FW	(India) Shyam Thapa
FW	(India) Ranjit Mukherjee
MF	(India) Kesto Mitra
MF	(India) Munish Manna
MF	(India) Sanjb Chowdhury
MF	(India) Ashok Chakrabarty
Coach:
(India) Amal Dutta

Match rules

- 70 minutes.

== Aftermath of the disaster ==
The bodies of the injured were taken over to the nearby hospitals and people flocked over at the various locations to identify their missing kin. The police report claimed that 16 fans were dead and many were left injured. All the matches for the rest of the season were cancelled and both the teams were heavily fined.

=== Impact on people ===
This tragedy sent the entire sports fraternity and the Bengali community into shock and people who were regulars to the Kolkata Maidan suddenly disappeared on the aftermath of the disaster. The football-crazy Bengali was nowhere to be seen, as they faced stiff resistance from their families to attend the next set of matches. People who went to the matches every week now either snapped their ties from the Kolkata Maidan or attended the games with fear in their minds. The fanaticism in Kolkata regarding the Beautiful Game was gone and took nearly two decades to recover, until when the Salt Lake Stadium saw a record-breaking attendance of 131,000 in the 1997 Federation Cup.

== Commemorations ==
The Indian Football Association observes Football Lovers' Day as a memorial to the 16 Football Fans who died on 16 August 1980. The first memorial, held in 1981, saw a total number of 1203 people donating blood.

The IFA and other District Associations observe the Football Lovers' Day every year on 16 August and the players who were part of the ill-fated match are present at the event and hand over signed certificates to the blood donors.

The singer Manna Dey sang a song, Khela football khela, composed by Suparnakanti Ghosh, to pay homage to those who lost their lives on that day.

== The 16 fans ==
The names of the 16 football lovers who died on that day:

- Kartik Maity
- Uttam Chowle
- Samir Das
- Aloke Das
- Sanat Basu
- Nabin Nashkar
- Kalyan Samanta
- Ashim Chatterjee
- Robin Adak
- Kartik Maji
- Dhananjoy Das
- Shyamal Biswas
- Madan Mohan Bagli
- Prashanta Dutta
- Himangshu Sekhar Das
- Bishwajit Kar
