= Saptagram Assembly constituency =

Saptagram
- Constituency No. 193 for the West Bengal Legislative Assembly
- Interactive Map Outlining Saptagram Assembly Constituency

Constituency details
- Country: India
- Region: East India
- State: West Bengal
- District: Hooghly
- Lok Sabha constituency: Hooghly
- Established: 2011
- Total electors: 186,561
- Reservation: None

Member of Legislative Assembly
- 18th West Bengal Legislative Assembly
- Incumbent Swaraj Ghosh
- Party: BJP
- Alliance: NDA
- Elected year: 2026

Saptagram Assembly constituency is an assembly constituency in Hooghly district in the Indian state of West Bengal.

== Overview ==
As per orders of the Delimitation Commission, No. 193 Saptagram Assembly constituency is composed of the following: Bansberia Municipality, Akna, Amnan, Goswami Malipara, Harit and Mahanad gram panchayats of Polba Dadpur community development block, and Mogra II and Saptagram gram panchayats of Chinsurah Mogra community development block.

Saptagram Assembly constituency is part of No. 28 Hooghly Lok Sabha constituency.

== Members of the Legislative Assembly ==
Election	Member	Party
Bansberia
1977	Prabir Sengupta	Communist Party of India (Marxist)
1982	Prabir Sengupta	Communist Party of India (Marxist)
1987	Prabir Sengupta	Communist Party of India (Marxist)
1991	Prabir Sengupta	Communist Party of India (Marxist)
1996	Robin Mukherjee	Indian National Congress
2001	Ashutosh Mukhopadhyay	Communist Party of India (Marxist)
2006	Ashutosh Mukhopadhyay	Communist Party of India (Marxist)
Saptagram
2011	Tapan Dasgupta	Trinamool Congress
2016	Tapan Dasgupta	Trinamool Congress
2021	Tapan Dasgupta	Trinamool Congress
2026	Swaraj Ghosh	Bharatiya Janata Party

== Election results ==
=== 2026 ===
2026 West Bengal Legislative Assembly election: Saptagram
Party	Candidate	Votes	%	±%
BJP	Swaraj Ghosh	102,414	52.1	▲8.62
AITC	Bidesh Ranjan Bose	79,125	40.25	▼8.31
CPI(M)	Anirban Sarkar	9,198	4.68	New entry
NOTA	None of the above	1,101	0.56	▼1.02
Majority		23,289	11.85	▲6.77
Turnout		196,584	93.35	▲11.51
BJP gain from AITC		Swing		

=== 2021 ===
2021 West Bengal Legislative Assembly election: Saptagram
Party	Candidate	Votes	%	±%
AITC	Tapan Dasgupta	93,328	48.56	▼0.37
BJP	Debabrata Biswas	83,556	43.48	▲34.33
INC	Pabitra Deb	8,332	4.34	▼34.29
NOTA	None of the above	3,037	1.58	▼0.03
Majority		9,772	5.08	▼5.22
Turnout		189,153	82.27	▼0.73
AITC hold		Swing		

=== 2016 ===
2016 West Bengal Legislative Assembly election: Saptagram
Party	Candidate	Votes	%	±%
AITC	Tapan Dasgupta	88,208	48.93	▼7.58
INC	Dilip Nath	69,641	38.63	New entry
BJP	Sushanta Sengupta	16,494	9.15	▲6.92
NOTA	None of the Above	2,894	1.61	New entry
CPI(ML)L	Sajal Adhikari	1,536	0.85	▼1.41
JMM	Kashinath Murmu	1,509	0.84	New entry
Turnout		1,80,394	83.91	▼1.59
Majority		18,567	10.30	▼9.02
AITC hold		Swing		

=== 2011 ===
2011 West Bengal Legislative Assembly election: Saptagram
Party	Candidate	Votes	%	±%
AITC	Tapan Dasgupta	90,289	56.51	
CPI(M)	Ashutosh Mukhopadhyay	59,421	37.19	
CPI(ML)L	Sadhan Mal	3,612	2.26	
BJP	Kartick Chandra Paul	3,559	2.23	
ABHM	Priyatosh Majumder	1,866	1.17	
JDP	Meghnath Tudu	1,040	0.65	
Turnout		1,59,787	85.50	
Majority		30,868	19.32	
AITC win (new seat)				
