= Rabindranath Bhattacharya =

Indian politician

Minister for Agriculture
- In office 20 May 2011 – 21 November 2012
- Governor: M. K. Narayanan
- Succeeded by: Dr. Asish Banerjee
- Constituency: Singur

Minister for Statistics & Programme Implementation
- In office 21 November 2012 – 10 May 2016
- Governor: M. K. Narayanan
- Preceded by: Chandranath Sinha
- Succeeded by: Asish Banerjee
- Constituency: Singur

Member of West Bengal Legislative Assembly
- In office 2001–2021
- Preceded by: Bidyut Kumar Das
- Succeeded by: Becharam Manna
- Constituency: Singur

Personal details
- Born: 1 September 1932 (age 94)
- Party: Bharatiya Janata Party (2021–present)
- Other political affiliations: Trinamool Congress (1998–2021)
- Children: 1

Rabindranath Bhattacharya is an Indian politician. He was also an MLA, elected from the Singur constituency in the 2011 West Bengal state assembly election. Bhattacharjee is better known as “Mastermoshai” which means teacher.

== Political career ==
In 2001, Bhattacharjee won the Singur constituency for Trinamool Congress. He was instrumental in mobilizing land acquisition of a proposed Tata Nano factory in Singur. This was one of the causes which led to the defeat of the longest-serving democratically elected Communist government in the world, ending the 34-year rule of the Left Front government, a fact that was noted by the international media. He played a crucial role in the 2007 anti-land acquisition movement launched by Mamata Banerjee.

From May 2011 to November 2012, he was Minister for Agriculture in Mamata Banerjee ministry and was Minister for Statistics & Programme Implementation November 2012 to May 2016.

In 2021 elections, TMC denied a ticket for Bhattacharjee. He joined Bharatiya Janata Party and became the candidate from Singur.
