= Rupchand Pal =

Indian politician (1936–2022)

Rupchand Pal MP

Member of the Indian Parliament for Hooghly
- Preceded by: Bijoy Krishna Modak
- Succeeded by: Dr. Ratna De (Nag)
- In office 1980–1984
- In office 1989–2009

Personal details
- Born: 2 December 1936 Hooghly, Bengal Presidency, British India
- Died: 16 August 2022 (aged 85) Kolkata, West Bengal, India
- Party: CPI(M)

Rupchand Pal (Bengali: রূপচাঁদ পাল; 2 December 1936 – 16 August 2022) was an Indian politician and a member of the Communist Party of India (Marxist). He was elected to the 7th Lok Sabha in 1980 from Hooghly constituency in West Bengal. He was re-elected to the Lok Sabha in 1989, 1991, 1996, 1998, 1999 and 2004, from the same constituency.
