= Al-Ameen Mission =

Educational institute in West Bengal, India

Location
- Khalatpur, Udaynarayanpur, Howrah, West Bengal; City Office: 53B, Elliot Road, Park Circus, Kolkata - 700016

Information
- Established: 1986; 40 years ago
- Founder: M. Nurul Islam
- Language: Bengali, English
- Publication: Al-Ameen Barta; Al-Ameen News Letter
- Website: alameenmission.org

Al-Ameen Mission is a residential educational institute founded in 1987 with the goal of providing education and social services to underprivileged communities. It is located in the village of Khalatpur in Howrah district of West Bengal, India. It is now spread across 18 districts of the state with 76 branches. Currently, about 12 thousand residential students attend. About 20 thousand students have attended the institute. Al ameen mission have now currently 74 branches and they expanding well in India. They have two other branches in India.It helped a lot to the people of rural area like Uttar Dinajpur, a less educated district where Hemtabad campus is famous . They performed very well in secondary examination and they notable alumni like Jahangir alam, Nurujjaman who is currently serving as doctor in North Bengal Medical College.

== History ==
The Secretary-General of the Mission, Nurul Islam, set up the Khalatpur Junior High Madrasa in 1976, when he was still studying his tenth standard. In May 1984, he started the Institute of Islamic Culture, setting up a hostel for the institute in 1986 in the Madrasa building itself, supplying it with the collection of one fistful of rice from every home in his village, Khalatpur. In January 1987, it was renamed to Al-Ameen Mission, inspired by the Al-Ameen Educational Society of Dr. Mumtaj Ahmed Khan and Ramkrishna mission. It was later financially supported by industrialist Mustaque Hossain and many others.

Al-Ameen Mission follows the curriculum of the West Bengal Board of Secondary Education, but is transitioning to CBSE. A few new branches have been started, which are following the CBSE curriculum. In 2002, it was awarded "The Telegraph School Award for Excellence" which is shared with the South Point High School.

== Activities ==
As well as being an educational institute, Al-Ameen Mission also performs charitable work for the Muslim community. It has helped unemployed Muslims with loans and has started scholarship programs to help other communities' needy students.

On 19 May 2015, Al-Ameen Mission received the Banga Bhushan Award. For the past several years Al Ameen Mission has been lauded for lifting the underprivileged kids to the profession and out of poverty.

On 29 January 2023, Al-Ameen Mission started new residential school for orphan of class 2 to 4 named Amar Bari Shanti Neer (My home, peace home).

== Funding ==
Al-Ameen Mission is funded through donations from individuals, corporations, and the government. The mission is mostly run by donation and zakat. Muslims throughout the country contribute their zakat to the Mission, which takes care of 25% of seats reserved for the poor, destitute, and orphans. It has received funding from many sources such as Pataka Industries Pvt. Limited, the Maulana Azad Education Foundation and the Board of Waqfs, West Bengal.

== Campus ==
The Al-Ameen Mission has established several campuses across India, providing education and social services to underprivileged communities in multiple states. The main campus of Mission, Al-Ameen Mission for Boys, is located at Khalatpur, Howrah.

In addition to academic facilities, the Al-Ameen campuses also provide social services such as healthcare and counseling.

| Branch | Type | Established | Specialization | Location | District | State |
|---|---|---|---|---|---|---|
| Al-Ameen Mission | | 1986 | | Khalatpur | Howrah | West Bengal |
| Al-Ameen Mission for Girls | | 2000 | | Khalatpur | Howrah | West Benga |
| Al-Ameen Mission, Belpukur | | | | Belpukur | Dakshin Dinajpur | West Bengal |
| Al-Ameen Mission, Patharchapuri | | | | Patharchapri | Birbhum | West Bengal |
| Al-Ameen Mission, Dhuliyan | | | | Dhulian | Murshidabad | West Bengal |
| Al-Ameen Mission, Panchur | | | | Panchur | Kolkata | West Bengal |
| Al-Ameen Mission Academy, Beldanga | | | | Beldanga | Murshidabad | West Bengal |
| Al-Ameen Mission Academy | | | | Nayabaz | Howrah | West Bengal |
| Al-Ameen Mission Academy | | | | Khalishani | Howrah | West Bengal |
| Al-Ameen Mission Academy | | | | Uluberia | Howrah | West Bengal |
| Al-Ameen Mission Academy | | | | Newtown | North 24 Parganas | West Bengal |
| Al-Ameen Mission Academy | | | | Hasnecha | South 24 Parganas | West Bengal |
| Al-Ameen Mission Academy | | | | Suryapur | South 24 Parganas | West Bengal |
| Al-Ameen Mission Academy | | | | Babnan, Dadpur | Hooghly | West Bengal |
| Al-Ameen Mission Academy | | | | Pandua | Hooghly | West Bengal |
| Al-Ameen Mission Academy | | | | Chapra | Nadia | West Bengal |
| Al-Ameen Mission Academy | | | | | Malda | West Bengal |
| Al-Ameen Mission Academy | | | | Memari | Purba Bardwan | West Bengal |
| Al-Ameen Mission Academy | | | | | Jalpaiguri | West Bengal |
| Al-Ameen Mission Academy | | | | | Paschim Mednipur | West Bengal |
| Al-Ameen Mission Academy | | | | Ujuniya | Murshidabad | West Bengal |
| Al-Ameen Mission Academy | | | | Rampurhat | Birbhum | West Bengal |
| Al-Ameen Mission Academy | | | | Jharbari | | West Bengal |
| Al-Ameen Mission Academy | | | | Hemtabad | | West Bengal |
| Al-Ameen Mission Academy | | | | Siliguri | | West Bengal |
| Al-Ameen Mission Academy | | | | kharagpur | | West Bengal |
| Al-Ameen Mission Academy | | | | Ratanpur | | West Bengal |
| Al-Ameen Mission Academy | | | | Vabta | | West Bengal |
| Al-Ameen Mission Academy | | | | | Ranchi | |
| Al-Ameen Mission Academy | | | | Hauli | | West Bengal |
| Palasi Girls Hostel | | | | | Nadia | West Bengal |
| Chichuriya High School | Boys Hostel | | | | | |
| Al-Ameen Mission Academy | | | | | | Tripura |
| Al-Ameen Mission Academy | | | | Jharbari | Uttar Dinajpur | West Bengal |

Unsani(2012) 
Howrah
West Bengal

Al ameen residential academy(2022)
Lalbagh, Murshidabad
West Bengal

== Management ==
The main campus of Mission, Al-Ameen Mission is managed by a school board. The board of the main campus is also in charge of maintaining other sites. Across West Bengal, Al Ameen runs about 50 schools in total. Most of them are directly run by Al Ameen Mission and a few are located in remote village areas which are run by local non-profits for better management and service. These schools are listed as in "Collaboration with Al Ameen Mission." Aside from the details of management, these schools are identical to Al Ameen Mission's schools.

== See also ==
- List of schools in Howrah
