= Karabi Manna =

Indian politician

Karabi Manna (born 1975) is an Indian politician from West Bengal. She has served as a member of the West Bengal Legislative Assembly from Haripal Assembly constituency in Hooghly district in the 17th West Bengal Assembly. She won the 2021 West Bengal Legislative Assembly election representing the All India Trinamool Congress. She was defeated in the 2026 West Bengal Legislative Assembly election from Haripal Assembly Constituency by Madhumita Ghosh.

== Early life and education ==
Manna is from Singur, Hooghly district, West Bengal. Her husband Becharam Manna, is a former MLA. She completed her diploma in Homeopathic medicine and surgery in 1999 at Netai Charan Chakravarty Homoeopathic Medical College & Hospital, which is affiliated with West Bengal Central Council of Homeopathy.

== Career ==
Manna won from Haripal Assembly constituency representing All India Trinamool Congress in the 2021 West Bengal Legislative Assembly election. She polled 110,215 votes and defeated her nearest rival, Samiran Mitra of the Bharatiya Janata Party, by a margin of 23,072 votes.
