= Department of Environment (West Bengal) =

State government department in West Bengal, India

Department overview
- Formed: 1982
- Jurisdiction: Government of West Bengal
- Headquarters: Prani Sampad Bhavan, 5th Floor, LB-2, Sector-III, Salt Lake, Kolkata-700098
- Minister responsible: Manoj Kumar Oraon, Cabinet Minister
- Department executive: Sri Rajesh Kumar, IAS, Principal Secretary
- Website: www.wbpcb.gov.in

Department of Environment is a department in the jurisdiction of the Government of West Bengal. It was established in 1982. The department is headed by a Minister in Charge, with Principal Secretary as administrative head. Their vision is "Building Environment Smart and Climate Change Resilient West Bengal".

== Ministerial team and activities ==
The activities of the department include:

- Preservation of environment and ecology.
- Prevention and control of pollution of air, water and land.
- Co-ordination between departments and agencies of the State and the Union Government concerned with the policies and schemes relating to environment.
- Acting as the nodal department for climate change related activities in the state of West Bengal.

The current Minister in charge is Vacant due to New Govt. of West Bengal Formed on 09 May 2026.

== Composition ==
- The West Bengal Pollution Control Board
- The West Bengal Biodiversity Board
- Institute of Environmental Studies and Wetland Management Authority
- East Kolkata Wetlands Management Authority
- West Bengal State Wetland Authority

== Supporting Organisation ==
- State Environment Impact Assessment Authority, WB
- West Bengal State Coastal Zone Management Authority
