= Partha Ghosh =

Indian elocutionist (1938/1939 – 2022)

- Born: 1938/1939
- Died: 7 May 2022 (aged 83); Kolkata, West Bengal, India
- Occupations: Radio presenter; elocutionist
- Spouse: Gouri Ghosh

Partha Ghosh (1938/1939 – 7 May 2022) was a noted elocutionist of West Bengal. He is known for his works Sotti Jabe, Chhai and Maa. He rose to fame after he started hosting Galpa Dadur Asar at the All India Radio.

== Early life ==
Ghosh hailed from Baharampur and later he shifted to Kolkata.

== Career ==
Ghosh was associated with the All India Radio, Kolkata as an announcer-presenter. He along with his wife Gouri Ghosh worked on an album based on Rabindranath Tagore's Karna Kunti Sangbad.

== Awards ==
Ghosh was awarded the Friends of Liberation War Honour for his contribution to the 1971 Liberation War. In 2018, he was awarded the Banga Bhushan by the West Bengal Government.

== Death ==
Ghosh died on 7 May 2022. He died of a massive cardiac arrest at the age of 83. He was survived by his son Ayan.
