= Gouri Ghosh =

Indian elocutionist (1938–2021)

- Born: 1938; West Bengal, British India
- Died: 26 August 2021 (aged 83); Kolkata, West Bengal, India
- Occupations: Reciter; Elocutionist
- Spouse: Partha Ghosh

Gouri Ghosh was a noted elocutionist of West Bengal. She had rendered her voice to several milestone albums in Bengali recitation. Known for her work on Tagore poems, like ‘Karna Kunti Sangbad’, ‘Shesher Kabita’ and ‘Bisarjan’. Ghosh started off in the All India Radio as a selection-grade announcer and enthralled the audience for decades. Critically acclaimed for her pronunciation and voice, Ghosh's death marks the end of an era in Bengali recitation.

== Career ==
Ghosh was associated with the All India Radio, Kolkata. During the Bangladesh Liberation War, she was an announcer and a broadcaster at the All India Radio. She along with her husband Partha Ghosh worked on an album based on Rabindranath Tagore's Karna Kunti Sangbad.

== Death ==
Ghosh died on 26 August 2021. She was suffering from brain stroke and died at the age of 83. She was survived by her husband Partha Ghosh, and a son Ayan.

== Awards ==
Ghosh was awarded the Friends of Liberation War Honour for writing features on war and genocide by the Bangladesh PM Sheikh Hasina. In 2018, she was awarded Kazi Sabyasachi Samman by the West Bengal government.
