= Deepanjan Kumar Guha =

Indian politician

- দীপাঞ্জন কুমার গুহ

Member of the West Bengal Legislative Assembly
- Incumbent
- Assumed office 4 May 2026
- Preceded by: Indranil Sen
- Constituency: Chandannagar

Personal details
- Party: Bharatiya Janata Party
- Parent: Dipak Kumar Guha
- Education: Sikkim Manipal University
- Occupation: Business
- Profession: Politician

Deepanjan Kumar Guha (born 1982) is an Indian politician from West Bengal. He is a member of West Bengal Legislative Assembly from the Chandannagar Assembly constituency in Hooghly district representing the Bharatiya Janata Party.

== Early life and education ==
Guha is from Chunchura, Hooghly district of West Bengal. He is the son of the late Dipak Kumar Guha. He completed his Master of Business Administration at Sikkim Manipal University in 2012. He runs his own business. He declared assets worth ₹ 1.7 crore in his affidavit to the Election Commission of India.

== Political career ==
Guha won the Chandannagar Assembly constituency representing the BJP in the 2026 West Bengal Legislative Assembly election. He polled 86,273 votes and defeated his nearest rival and sitting MLA, Indranil Sen of the All India Trinamool Congress, by a margin of 13,441 votes. Earlier in the 2021 West Bengal Legislative Assembly election, he contested from the same seat for BJP and polled 55,749 votes but lost to Indranil Sen of Trinamool Congress, by 31,029 votes.

=== Electoral performance ===
West Bengal Legislative Assembly
| Year | Constituency | Party | Votes | % | Opponent | Party | Votes | % | Margin | Result |
|---|---|---|---|---|---|---|---|---|---|---|
| 2026 | Chandannagar | BJP | 86,273 | 46.16 | Indranil Sen | AITC | 72,832 | 38.97 | 13,441 | Won |
