= Singur Assembly constituency =

Singur
- Constituency No. 188 for the West Bengal Legislative Assembly
- Interactive Map Outlining Singur Assembly Constituency

Constituency details
- Country: India
- Region: East India
- State: West Bengal
- District: Hooghly
- Lok Sabha constituency: Hooghly
- Established: 1951
- Total electors: 222,573
- Reservation: None

Member of Legislative Assembly
- 18th West Bengal Legislative Assembly
- Incumbent Arup Kumar Das
- Party: BJP
- Alliance: NDA
- Elected year: 2026

Singur Assembly constituency is an assembly constituency in Hooghly district in the Indian state of West Bengal.

== Overview ==
As per orders of the Delimitation Commission, No. 188 Singur Assembly constituency is composed of the following: Anandanagore, Bagdanga Chinamore, Baruipara Paltagarh, Beraberi, Bighati, Bouichipota, Bora, Borai Pahalampur, Gopalnagore, Mirzapur-Bankipur, Nasibpur, Singur I and Singur II gram panchayats of Singur community development block and Begampur, Kapasaria and Panchghora gram panchayats of Chanditala II community development block.

Singur Assembly constituency is part of No. 28 Hooghly Lok Sabha constituency.

== Members of the Legislative Assembly ==
Year	Name	Party
1951	Sourendra Nath Saha	Communist Party of India
1951	Ajit Kumar Basu	Communist Party of India
1957	Provakar Pal	Indian National Congress
1962	Provakar Pal	Indian National Congress
1967	Provakar Pal	Indian National Congress
1969	Gopal Bandopadhyay	Communist Party of India (Marxist)
1971	Ajit Kumar Basu	Communist Party of India
1972	Ajit Kumar Basu	Communist Party of India
1977	Dr Gopal Bandopadhyay	Communist Party of India (Marxist)
1982	Tarapada Sadhukhan	Indian National Congress
1987	Bidyut Kumar Das	Communist Party of India (Marxist)
1991	Bidyut Kumar Das	Communist Party of India (Marxist)
1996	Bidyut Kumar Das	Communist Party of India (Marxist)
2001	Rabindranath Bhattacharya	Trinamool Congress
2006	Rabindranath Bhattacharya	Trinamool Congress
2011	Rabindranath Bhattacharya	Trinamool Congress
2016	Rabindranath Bhattacharya	Trinamool Congress
2021	Becharam Manna	Trinamool Congress
2026	Arup Kumar Das	Bharatiya Janata Party

== Election results ==
=== 2026 ===
2026 West Bengal Legislative Assembly election: Singur
Party	Candidate	Votes	%	±%
BJP	Arup Kumar Das	113,008	50.77	▲14.97
AITC	Becharam Manna	91,570	41.14	▼7.01
CPI(M)	Debashis Chatterjee	12,320	5.54	▼8.76
INC	Barun Kumar Malik	1,015	0.46	▼1.21
NOTA	None of the above	1,890	0.85	▼0.27
Majority		21,438	9.63	▼2.72
Turnout		222,573	93.71	▲8.67
BJP gain from AITC		Swing		

=== 2021 ===
2021 West Bengal Legislative Assembly election: Singur
Party	Candidate	Votes	%	±%
AITC	Becharam Manna	101,077	48.15	▼1.08
BJP	Rabindranath Bhattacharya	75,154	35.8	▲25.8
CPI(M)	Srijan Bhattacharya	30,016	14.3	▼24.53
NOTA	None of the above	2,345	1.12	▼0.47
Majority		25,923	12.35	▲1.95
Turnout		209,938	85.04	▼0.47
AITC hold		Swing		

=== 2016 ===
2016 West Bengal Legislative Assembly election: Singur
Party	Candidate	Votes	%	±%
AITC	Rabindranath Bhattacharya	96,212	49.23	▼8.38
CPI(M)	Rabin Deb	75,885	38.83	▲1.10
BJP	Souren Patra	14,264	7.30	▲2.64
NOTA	None of the Above	3,098	1.59	New entry
Independent	Dwijaprosad Bhattacharya	2,606	1.33	New entry
FDLP	Uma Das Paul	1,712	0.88	New entry
SUCI(C)	Shankar Jana	1,667	0.85	New entry
Majority		20,327	10.40	▼9.48
Turnout		1,95,444	84.57	▼0.59
AITC hold		Swing		

=== 2011 ===
2011 West Bengal Legislative Assembly election: Singur
Party	Candidate	Votes	%	±%
AITC	Rabindranath Bhattacharya	100,869	57.61	
CPI(M)	Asit Das	66,058	37.73	
BJP	Souren Patra	8,158	4.66	
Majority		34,811	19.88	
Turnout		1,75,085	85.16	
AITC hold		Swing		

=== 1971-2006 ===
In the 2006 and 2001 state assembly elections, Rabindranath Bhattacharya of Trinamool Congress won the Singur assembly seat defeating his nearest rivals, Srikanta Chattopadhyay of CPI(M) and Bidyut Kumar Das of CPI(M) respectively. Contests in most years were multi cornered but only winners and runners are being mentioned. Bidyut Kumar Das of CPI(M) defeated Dwijaprosad Bhattacharya of Congress in 1996, Chandra Sekhar Back of Congress in 1991 and Tarapada Sadhukhan of Congress in 1987. Tarapada Sadhukhan of Congress defeated Gopal Bandopadhyay of CPI(M) in 1982. Gopal Bandopadhyay of CPI(M) defeated Tarapada Sadhukhan of Congress in 1977.

=== 1952-1972 ===
Ajit Kumar Basu of CPI won in 1972 and 1971. Gopal Bandopadhyay of CPI(M) won in 1969. Provaakar Pal of Congress won in 1967, 1962 and 1957. In independent India's first election in 1951 Singoor (as spelt then) had a double seat. It was won by Sourendra Nath Saha and Ajit Kumar Basu, both of CPI.
