= Becharam Manna =

Indian politician

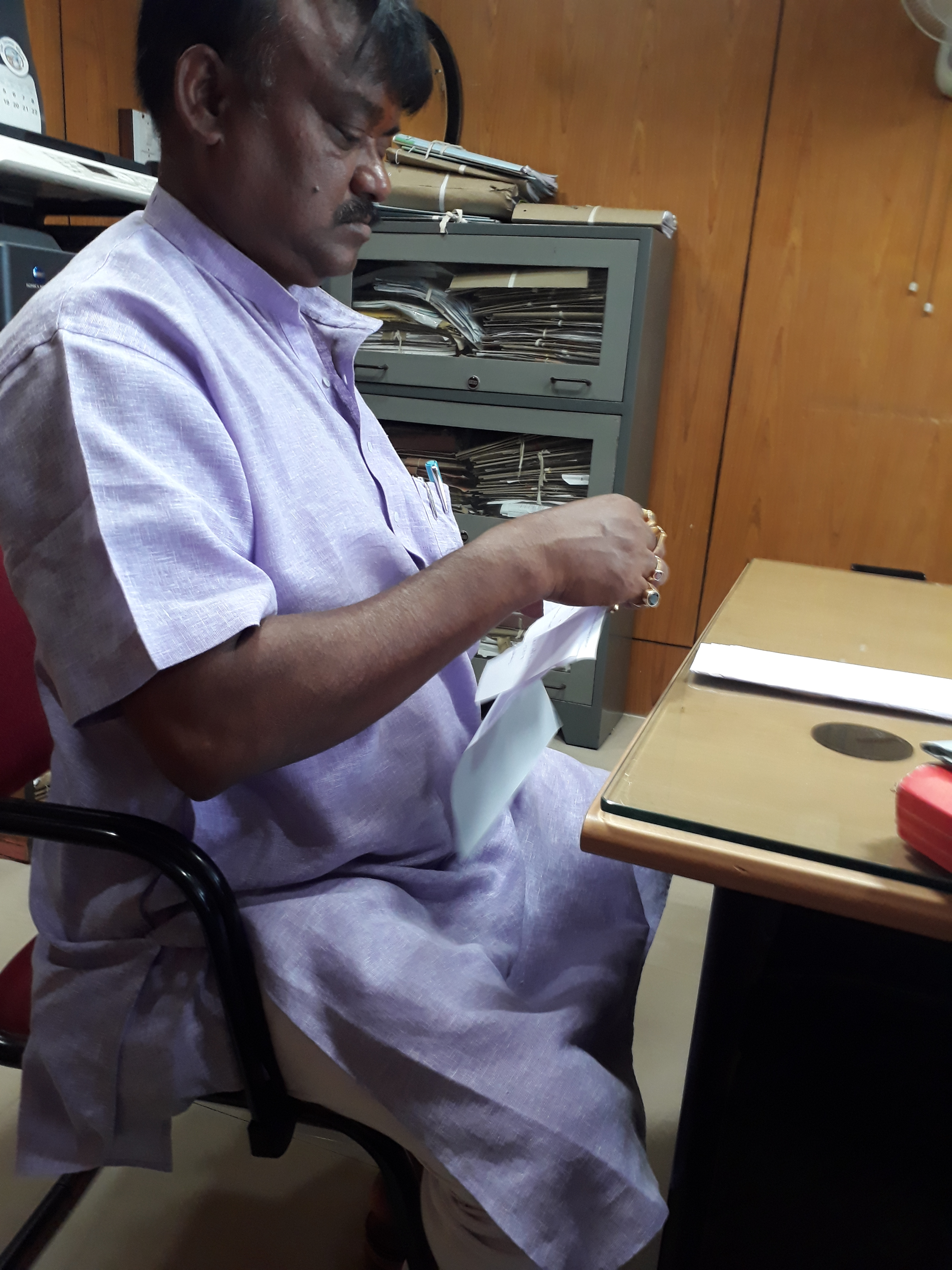

Minister of State (Independent Charge), Government of West Bengal
- In office 10 May 2021 – 7 May 2026
- Governor: C. V. Ananda Bose; R. N. Ravi
- Chief Minister: Mamata Banerjee
- Preceded by: Moloy Ghatak
- Succeeded by: Arjun Singh

Member of the West Bengal Legislative Assembly
- In office 2 May 2021 – 7 May 2026
- Preceded by: Rabindranath Bhattacharjee
- Succeeded by: Dr. Arup Kumar Das
- Constituency: Singur
- In office 13 May 2011 – 2 May 2021
- Preceded by: Bharati Mukherjee, CPI(M)
- Succeeded by: Karabi Manna
- Constituency: Haripal

Personal details
- Party: Trinamool Congress
- Spouse: Karabi Manna

Becharam Manna is an Indian politician representing Trinamool Congress. He won the Haripal seat by a margin of 22,000 votes, in the 2011 West Bengal state assembly elections. Becharam Manna is one of the architects of Singur Land movement and leader of mass movement against the then Left Front Government. He along with his close associates worked at the grassroot level to organise distressed farmers, bargadars, sharecroppers, agricultural laborers etc. who were aggrieved and showing protest, dharnas, rally at the work site to gain the mass and media attention. The Singur seat was retained by the sitting Trinamool Congress MLA, Rabindranath Bhattacharya. He also became Minister of State of the Agriculture Department, Government of West Bengal for few days and he later joined BJP and contested from Singur Assembly Constituency as BJP candidate in the West Bengal Legislative Assembly Election in the year 2021 but he got defeated and Becharam Manna was elected from Singur Assembly Constituency in the year 2021. Becharam Manna is well versed in three tier Panchyati Raj System. He contested several Panchyat elections. In the early days of his political career, he contested the three-tier Panchyat election and for first time elected as Gram Panchyat member of Singur-II Gram Panchyat in the year 1993. Then he again participated in three-tier Panchyat election in the year 2008 and was elected as a member in the Singur Panchyat Samity and then he became Sahakari-Sabapati of Singur Panchyat Samity in the Year 2008. After that for the first time he contested the West Bengal Assembly Election in the year 2011 from Haripal Assembly Constituency as TMC candidate and was elected from that constituency. He also became a member of the Cabinet as Minister-Of-state constituted under the leadership of Mamata Banerjee, who defeated CPIM (Left Front) and ended 34 years of ruling. During 2012 to 2015, he served as Minister-Of-State of different dept. of Government of West Bengal e.g. Agriculture Dept., Agriculture-Marketing dept., Land and Land Reforms dept.

He was the first person to challenge the Tata group at Singur, when the Nano plant was being constructed. He is the convener of Krishi Jami Raksha Samiti, a group agitating for the protection of agricultural land. At 2021 Elections in West Bengal Legislative Assembly, he was made a candidate from Singur and his wife from his constituency Haripal. They both won in the election. After the election Mamta Banarjee made him Minister of State (Independent Charge) for Department of Labour (West Bengal). During early reshuffling of Cabinet, he has been conferred with the charge of Minister Of State (Independent Charge) for Agriculture Marketing Department along with Minister Of State for Panchayat and Rural Development Department, Government of West Bengal.

On 2026 elections he was again made a candidate from Singur. This time he was defeated by Dr. Arup Kumar Das by a margin of 21438 votes.

== Background ==
Becharam Manna belongs to a poor Mahishya family of sharecroppers living at Ratanpur. Due to his family's farming background, he is also involved in farming & agriculture activities. He passed Secondary (Madhyamik) in the year 1986 from West Bengal Board of Secondary Education (WBBSE). He also completed his Diploma in Fitter from I.T.I. Bandel, Hooghly in the year 1992. His wife is a practicing Homeopathy Doctor. During his early days he worked in a jute mill for nearly 23 years. After winning in the elections, he confirmed that at Singur land had been “forcibly taken from nearly 2,900 villagers”.
