= Bidesh Ranjan Bose =

Indian politician and former footballer

Member of the West Bengal Legislative Assembly
- In office 6 May 2021 – 3 May 2026
- Preceded by: Idris Ali
- Succeeded by: Ritabrata Banerjee
- Constituency: Uluberia Purba

Personal details
- Born: 15 November 1953 (age 72) Kalna, West Bengal, India
- Party: All India Trinamool Congress
- Profession: footballer, politician
- Awards: Banga Bhushan (2014)

Bidesh Ranjan Bose, also known as Bidesh Bose or Bidesh Basu (born 15 November 1953), is a former Indian Bengali international footballer and politician from West Bengal. As a player, he appeared with Mohun Bagan AC in club football. He won the Uluberia Purba constituency seat in 2021 West Bengal assembly election as candidate of All India Trinamool Congress. He was awarded Banga Bhushan by the Government of West Bengal in 2014.

== Political career ==
He fought in 2026 assembly polls from Saptagram, but lost to BJP's Swaraj Ghosh.

== See also ==
- Banga Bhushan
- Uluberia Purba
- Football Lovers' Day
