= Arup Kumar Das (Singur politician) =

Indian politician (born 1974)

Arup Kumar Das (born 1974) is an Indian politician from West Bengal. He is a member of the West Bengal Legislative Assembly from the Singur Assembly constituency in Hooghly district representing the Bharatiya Janata Party.

== Early life ==
Das is from Singur, Hooghly district, West Bengal. He is the son of the late Haradhan Das. He did a diploma in Orthopaedics at University of Calcutta in 2005. He runs his own business. He declared assets worth Rs.3.9 crore in his affidavit to the Election Commission of India.

== Career ==
Das won the Singur Assembly constituency representing the Bharatiya Janata Party in the 2026 West Bengal Legislative Assembly election. He polled 1,13,008 votes and defeated his nearest rival and sitting MLA, Becharam Manna of the All India Trinamool Congress by a margin of 21,438 votes.
