= Samir Chakraborty =

Indian politician

Member of the West Bengal Legislative Assembly
- In office 2016–2021
- Preceded by: Manoranjan Patra
- Succeeded by: Arup Chakraborty
- Constituency: Taldangra

Personal details
- Party: Trinamool Congress
- Education: Vidyasagar College
- Profession: Politician, Businessman

Samir Chakraborty is an Indian politician from West Bengal. He was elected as a Member of the Legislative Assembly in 2016 West Bengal Legislative Assembly election from Taldangra, as a member of the Trinamool Congress.
