= Hindustan Institute of Engineering Technology =

Polytechnic College in Chennai, India

- Motto: To Make Every Man A Success And No Man A Failure
- Type: Private
- Established: 1966
- Chairperson: Elizabeth Verghese
- Director: Anand Jacob Verghese
- Location: Chennai, Tamil Nadu, India; 12.87318°N 79.990271°E
- Website: www.hiet.in

Hindustan Institute of Engineering Technology (HIET) is a private engineering college located at St. Thomas Mount, Chennai, India, with the main campus at Serapanachery, Kanchipuram District.It has two colleges, HIET Polytechnic College and HIET Aviation College.

== History ==
Hindustan Institute of Engineering Technology was established in 1966 Hindustan Engineering Training Centre (HETC). The Aircraft Maintenance Engineering course was started in 1970. The HIET Polytechnic College was started in the year 1979. The campus at Serapanachery was Inaugurated in 2012.
