= Rishra railway station =

Railway station in West Bengal, India

Rishra

General information
- Location: Subhash Nagar, Rishra, Hooghly district – 712248, West Bengal; India
- Coordinates: 22°43′34″N 88°20′37″E
- Elevation: 17 metres (56 ft)
- System: Kolkata Suburban Railway station
- Owner: Indian Railways
- Operator: Eastern Railway
- Line: Howrah–Bardhaman main line
- Platforms: 4
- Tracks: 4

Construction
- Structure type: At grade
- Parking: Yes
- Cycle facilities: Yes

Other information
- Status: Functioning
- Station code: RIS
- Zone(s): Eastern Railway
- Division(s): Howrah

History
- Opened: 1854
- Electrified: 1958
- Former names: East Indian Railway Company

Services
Preceding station	Kolkata Suburban Railway	Following station
Konnagar towards Howrah Junction	Eastern Line Main line	Shrirampur towards Bandel Junction
Route map
Location
- Location within West Bengal Location within India

Rishra railway station, on the Howrah–Bardhaman main line is situated in the Hooghly district of West Bengal. It serves Rishra and Mahesh (the southern part of Serampore).
