= Ichhapur railway station =

Railway station in West Bengal, India

Ichhapur
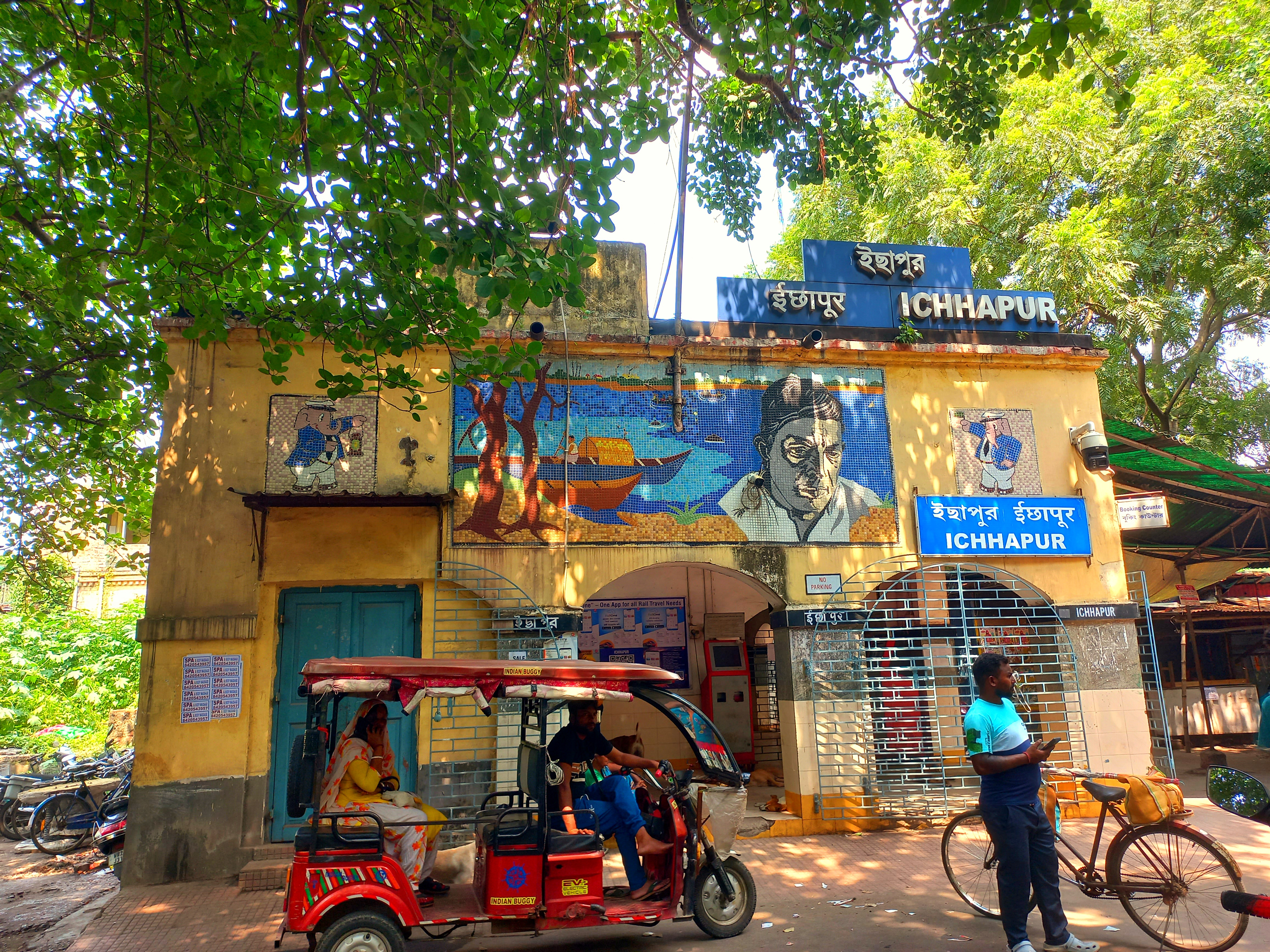
- Ichhapur railway station

General information
- Location: Ichapore, North 24 Parganas district, West Bengal; India
- Coordinates: 22°48′02″N 88°22′26″E
- Elevation: 10 metres (33 ft)
- System: Kolkata Suburban Railway station
- Owner: Indian Railways
- Operator: Eastern Railway
- Line: Sealdah–Ranaghat line of Kolkata Suburban Railway
- Platforms: 4
- Tracks: 4

Construction
- Structure type: Standard on ground station
- Parking: Not available
- Cycle facilities: Not available

Other information
- Status: Functional
- Station code: IP
- Zone(s): Eastern Railway
- Division(s): Sealdah

History
- Opened: 1862; 164 years ago
- Electrified: 1963–1965; 61 years ago

Services
| Preceding station | Kolkata Suburban Railway | Following station |
|---|---|---|
| Palta towards Sealdah | Eastern Line Main line | Shyamnagar towards Ranaghat Junction |
Route map
Location
- Location within West Bengal Location within India

Ichhapur railway station is the railway station in the town of Ichhapur. It serves the local areas of Ichhapur in North 24 Parganas district, West Bengal, India.

== History ==
The Sealdah–Kusthia line of the Eastern Bengal Railway was opened to railway traffic in the year 1862. Eastern Bengal Railway used to work only on the eastern side of the Hooghly River.

== Electrification ==
The Sealdah–Ranaghat sector was electrified in 1963–65.
