= Bally railway station =

Railway station in West Bengal, India

Bally
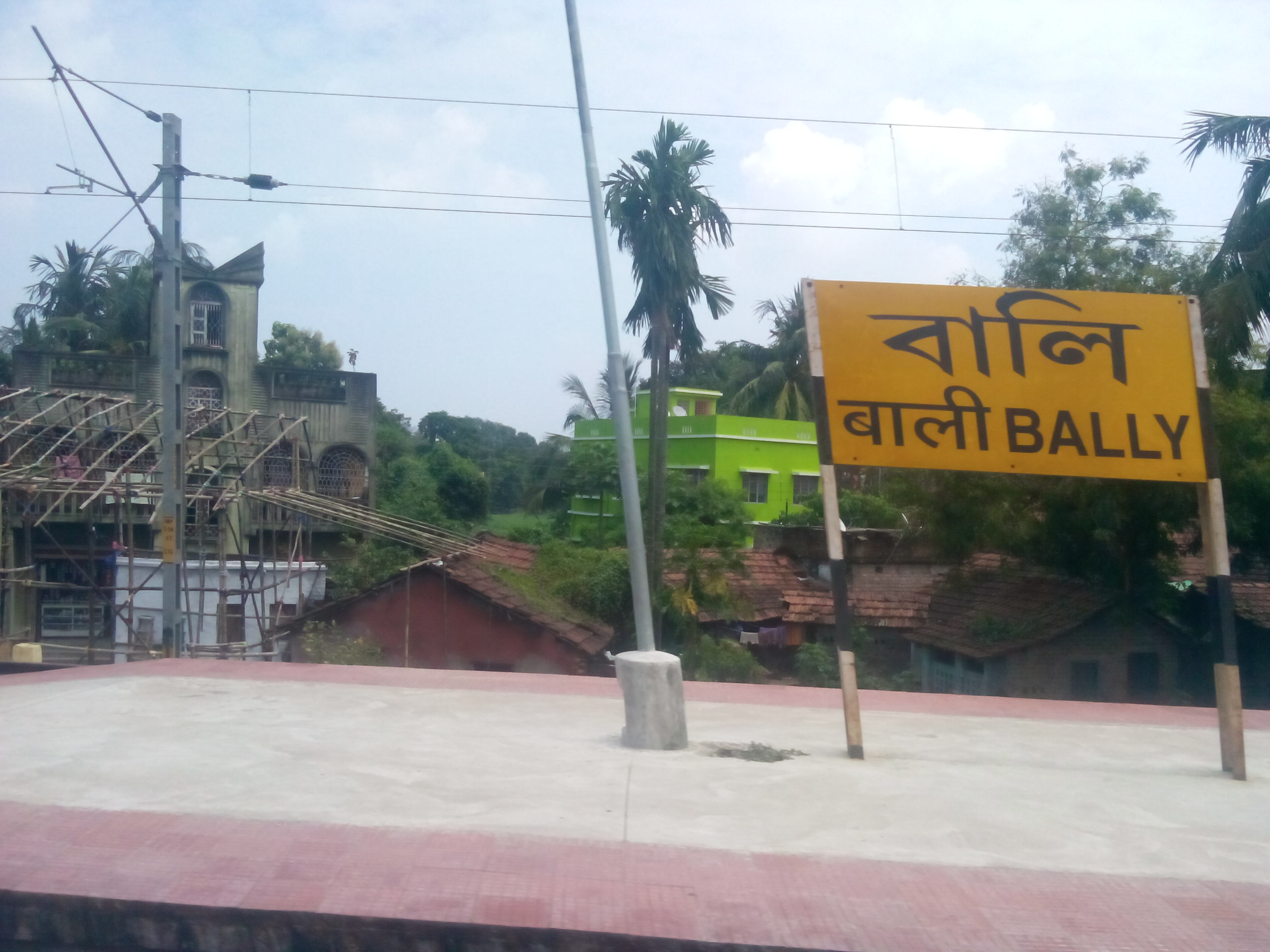
- Bally Station

General information
- Location: Bireswar Chatterjee Road, Bally, Howrah, West Bengal; India
- Coordinates: 22°39′22″N 88°20′26″E
- Elevation: 8 metres (26 ft)
- System: Kolkata Suburban Railway
- Owner: Indian Railways
- Operator: Eastern Railway
- Lines: Howrah–Bardhaman main line and Howrah–Bardhaman chord
- Platforms: 7
- Tracks: 7

Construction
- Structure type: Standard (on-ground station)
- Parking: No
- Cycle facilities: Yes

Other information
- Status: Functioning
- Station code: BLY
- Division(s): Howrah

History
- Opened: 1854
- Electrified: 1958
- Former names: East Indian Railway Company

Services
Preceding station	Kolkata Suburban Railway	Following station
Belur towards Howrah Junction	Eastern Line Main line & Howrah–Bardhaman chord	Uttarpara towards Bandel Junction
Belur towards Howrah Junction	Eastern Line Main line & Howrah–Bardhaman chord	Belanagar towards Barddhaman Junction
Route map
Location
- Location within Kolkata Location within West Bengal Location within India

Bally railway station is a Kolkata Suburban Railway station on the Howrah–Bardhaman main line and Howrah–Bardhaman chord line. It is located in Howrah in the Indian state of West Bengal. It is under the jurisdiction of Eastern Railway zone. Bally railway station is a small railway junction of Howrah railway division. It serves Bally and surrounding areas. It is 8 km from Howrah Station.

== History ==
East Indian Railway Company started construction of a line out of Howrah for the proposed link with Delhi via Rajmahal and Mirzapur in 1851.

The first passenger train in eastern India ran from Howrah to Hooghly on 15 August 1854. The track was extended to Raniganj by 1855.

== Electrification ==
Electrification of Howrah—Burdwan main line was completed with 25 kV AC overhead system in 1958.
