= Chakdaha railway station =

Railway station in West Bengal, India

Chakdaha
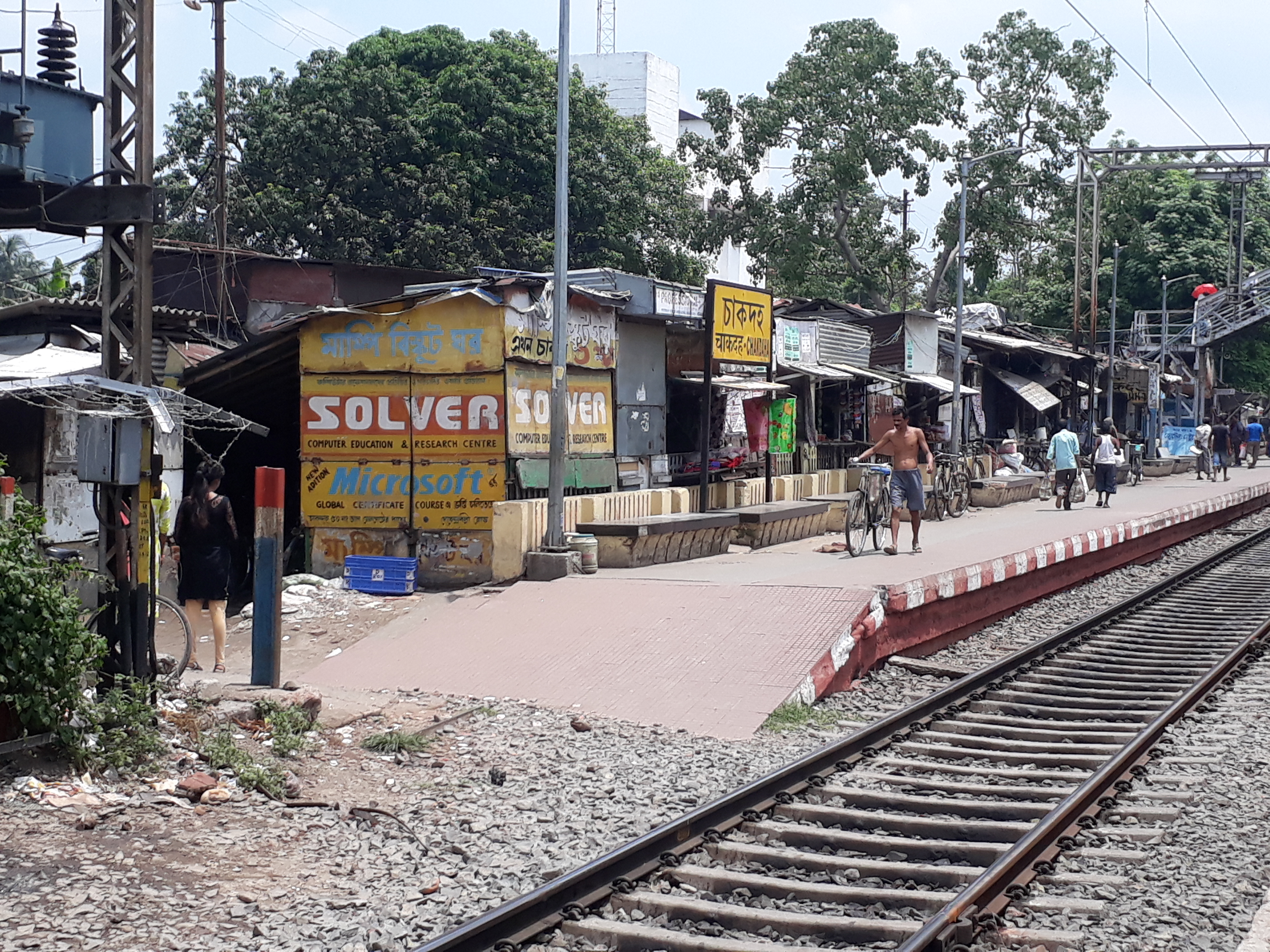
- Chakdaha railway station

General information
- Location: Chakdaha, Nadia, West Bengal; India
- Coordinates: 23°04′44″N 88°31′47″E
- Elevation: 13 metres (43 ft)
- System: Kolkata Suburban Railway station
- Owner: Indian Railways
- Operator: Eastern Railway
- Line: Sealdah–Ranaghat line of Kolkata Suburban Railway
- Platforms: 2
- Tracks: 2

Construction
- Structure type: At grade
- Parking: Not available
- Cycle facilities: Not available
- Accessible: Not available

Other information
- Status: Functional
- Station code: CDH
- Zone(s): Eastern Railway
- Division(s): Sealdah

History
- Opened: 1862; 164 years ago
- Electrified: 1963–1965; 61 years ago
- Former names: Eastern Bengal Railway

Services
| Preceding station | Kolkata Suburban Railway | Following station |
|---|---|---|
| Palpara towards Sealdah | Eastern Line Main line | Payradanga towards Ranaghat Junction |
Route map
Location
- Location within West Bengal Location within India

Chakdaha railway station is a railway station on the Sealdah–Ranaghat line. It serves the local areas of Chakdaha in the Nadia district of West Bengal.

== History ==
The Sealdah–Kusthia line of the Eastern Bengal Railway was opened to railway traffic in the year 1862. Eastern Bengal Railway used to work only on the eastern side of the Hooghly River.

== Station complex ==
The platform is not at all sheltered. It lacks many facilities including water and sanitation. There is no proper approach road to this station.

== Electrification ==
The Sealdah–Ranaghat sector was electrified in 1963–65.
