= Kankinara railway station =

Railway station in West Bengal, India

Kankinara
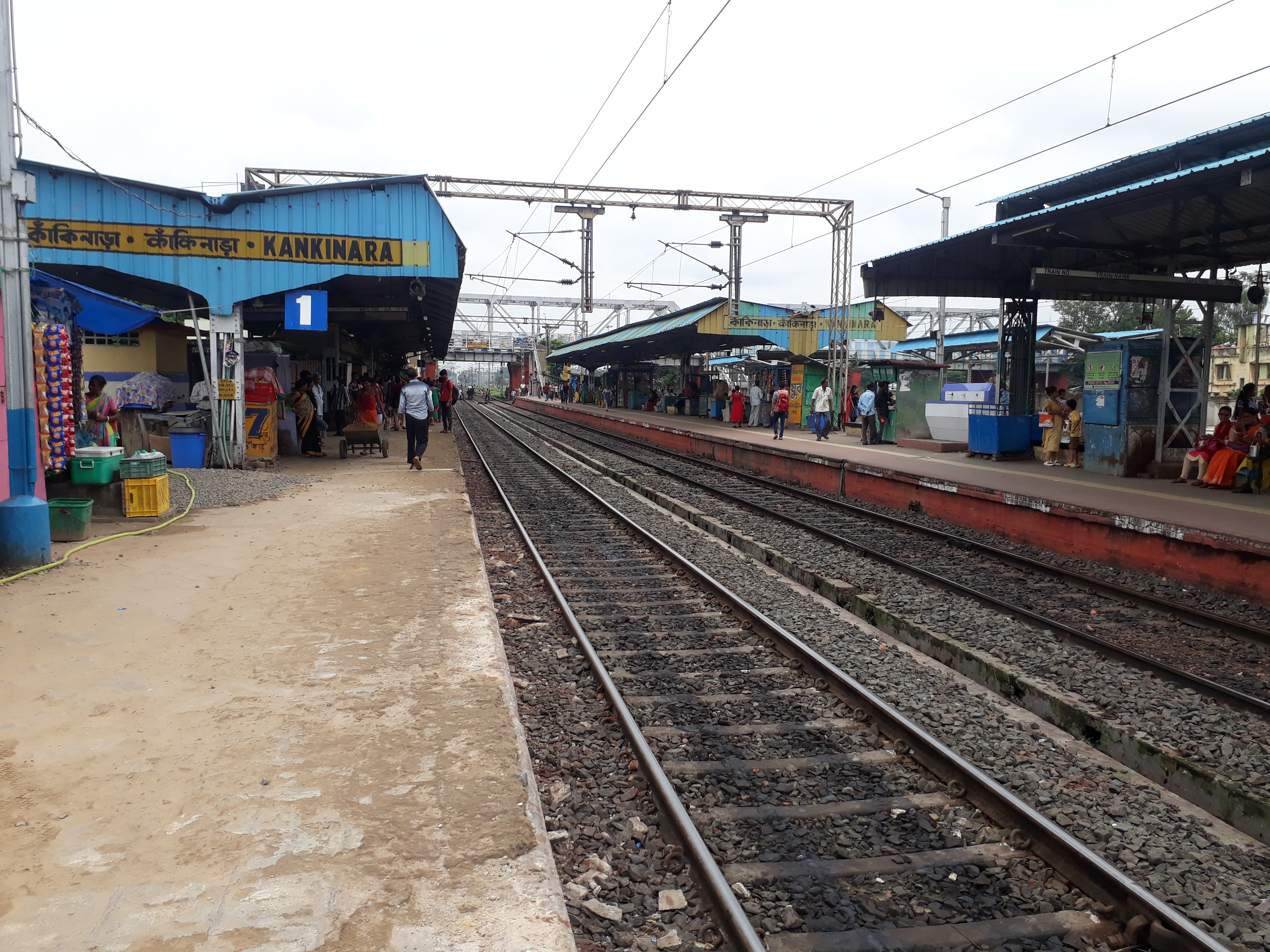
- Kankinara railway station

General information
- Location: 11, State Highway 1, Kankinara, Bhatpara, North 24 Parganas district, West Bengal; India
- Coordinates: 22°52′00″N 88°24′20″E
- Elevation: 13 metres (43 ft)
- System: Kolkata Suburban Railway station
- Owner: Indian Railways
- Operator: Eastern Railway
- Line: Sealdah–Ranaghat line of Kolkata Suburban Railway
- Platforms: 4
- Tracks: 4

Construction
- Structure type: Standard (on-ground station)
- Parking: available
- Cycle facilities: available

Other information
- Status: Functioning
- Station code: KNR
- Zone(s): Eastern Railway
- Division(s): Sealdah

History
- Opened: 1862; 164 years ago
- Electrified: 1963–1965; 61 years ago
- Former names: Eastern Bengal Railway

Services
Preceding station	Kolkata Suburban Railway	Following station
Jagaddal towards Sealdah	Eastern Line Main line	Naihati Junction towards Ranaghat Junction
Route map
Location
- Location within West Bengal Location within India

Kankinara (Code: KNR) is a railway station in North 24 Parganas district in the Indian state of West Bengal, which serves Bhatpara town. It lies on the Sealdah–Ranaghat line and is part of the Kolkata Suburban Railway system and is under the jurisdiction of Eastern Railway.

== History ==
The Calcutta (Sealdah)–Kusthia line of Eastern Bengal Railway was opened to traffic in 1862. Eastern Bengal Railway worked on the eastern side of the Hooghly River.

== Station complex ==
The platform is not very well sheltered. It has many facilities including water and sanitation. This railway station can be reached via the Amdanga Road in Bhatpara.

== Electrification ==
The Sealdah–Ranaghat sector was electrified in 1963–64.

== Gallery ==
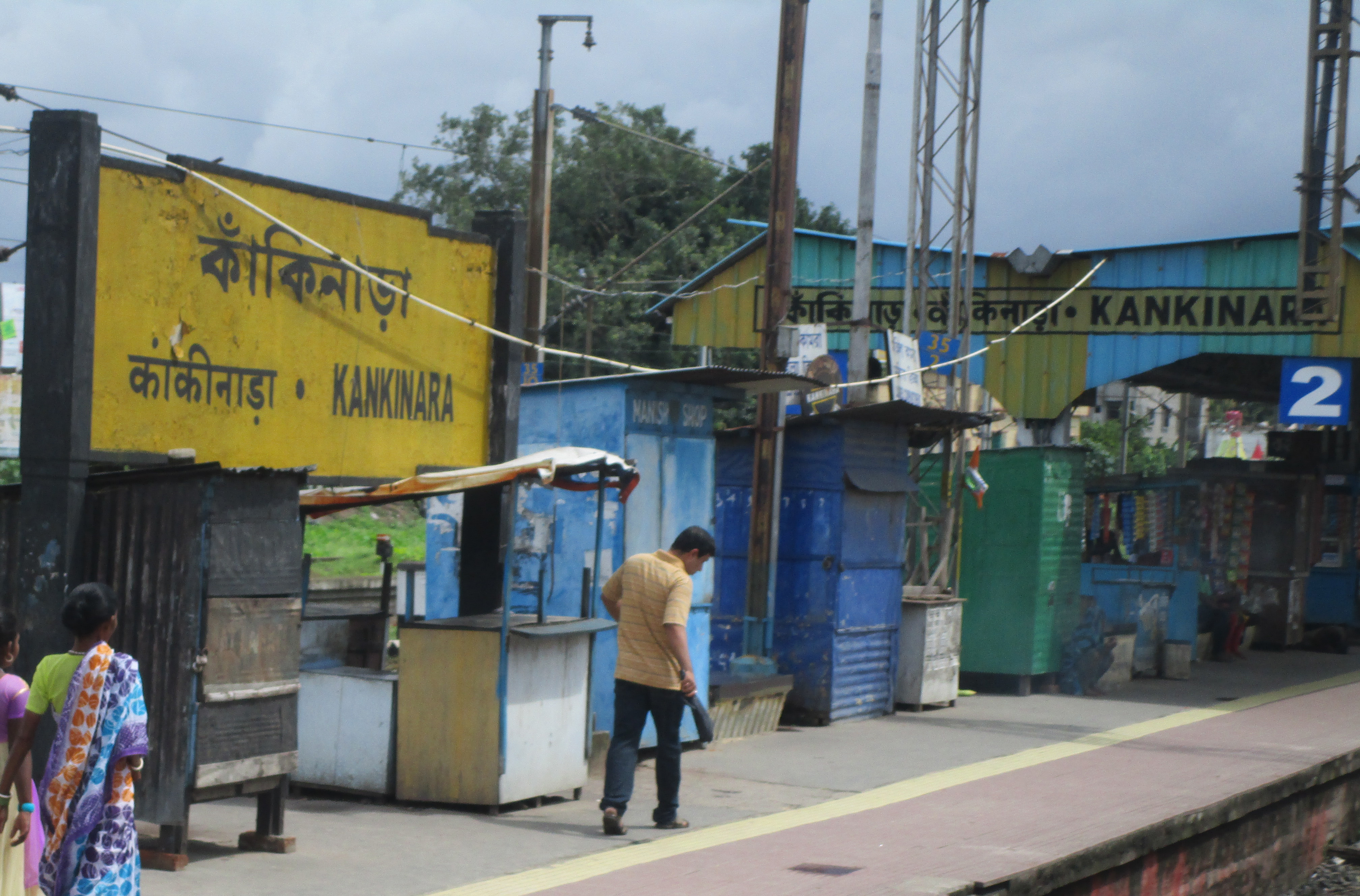

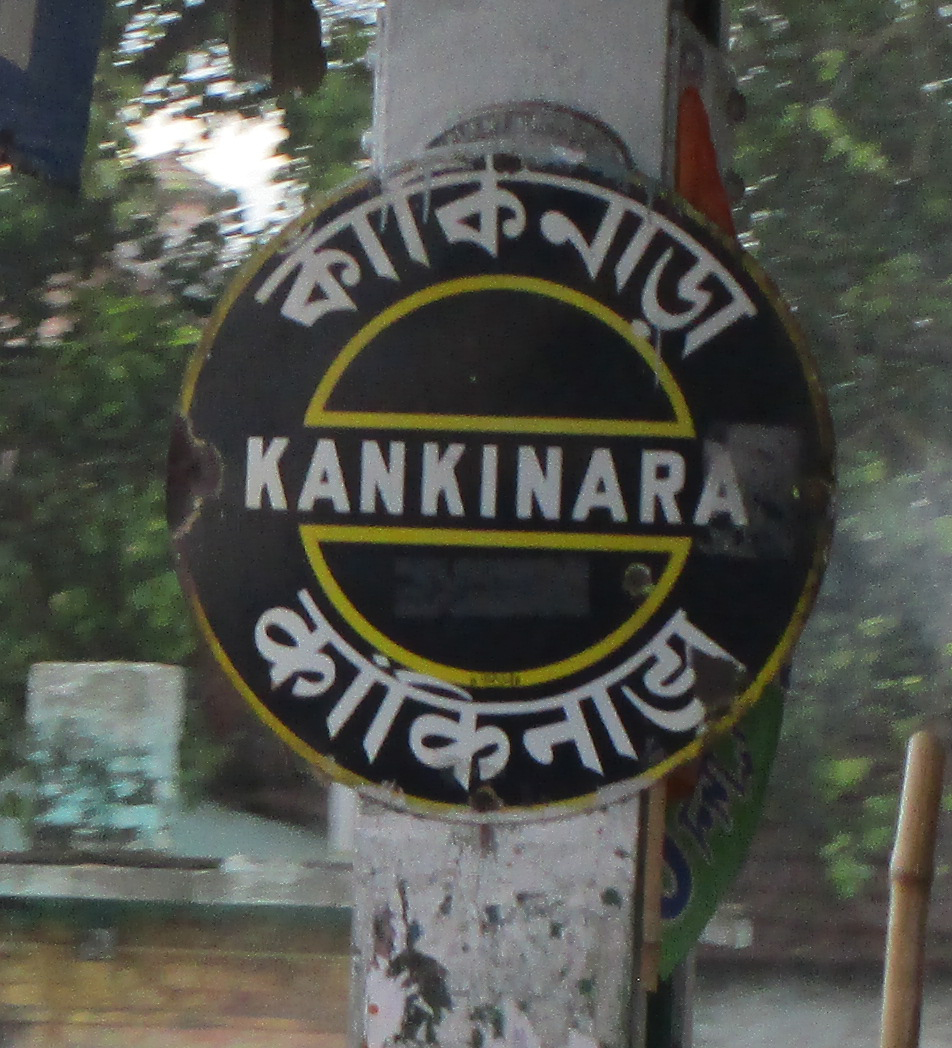

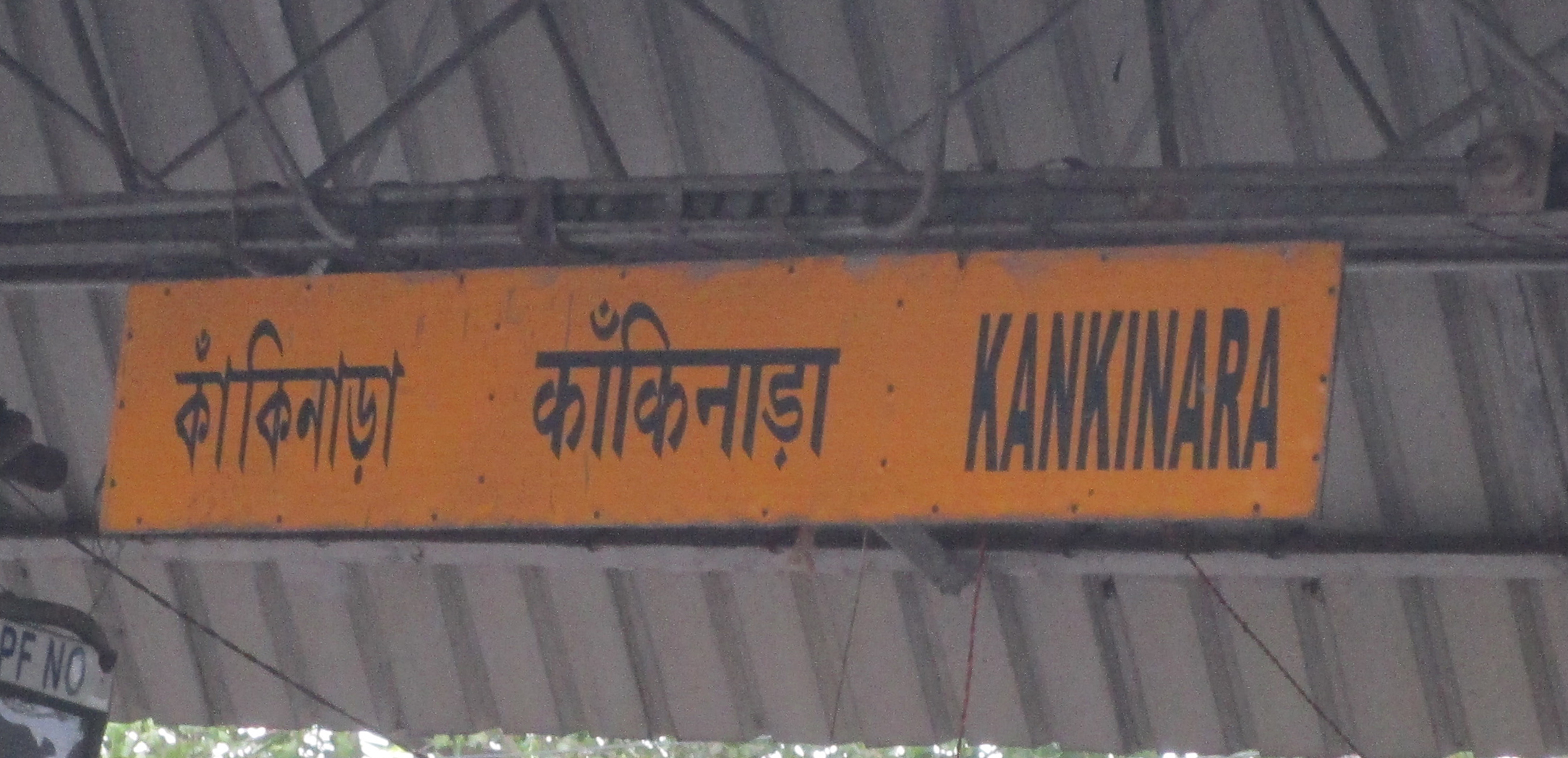

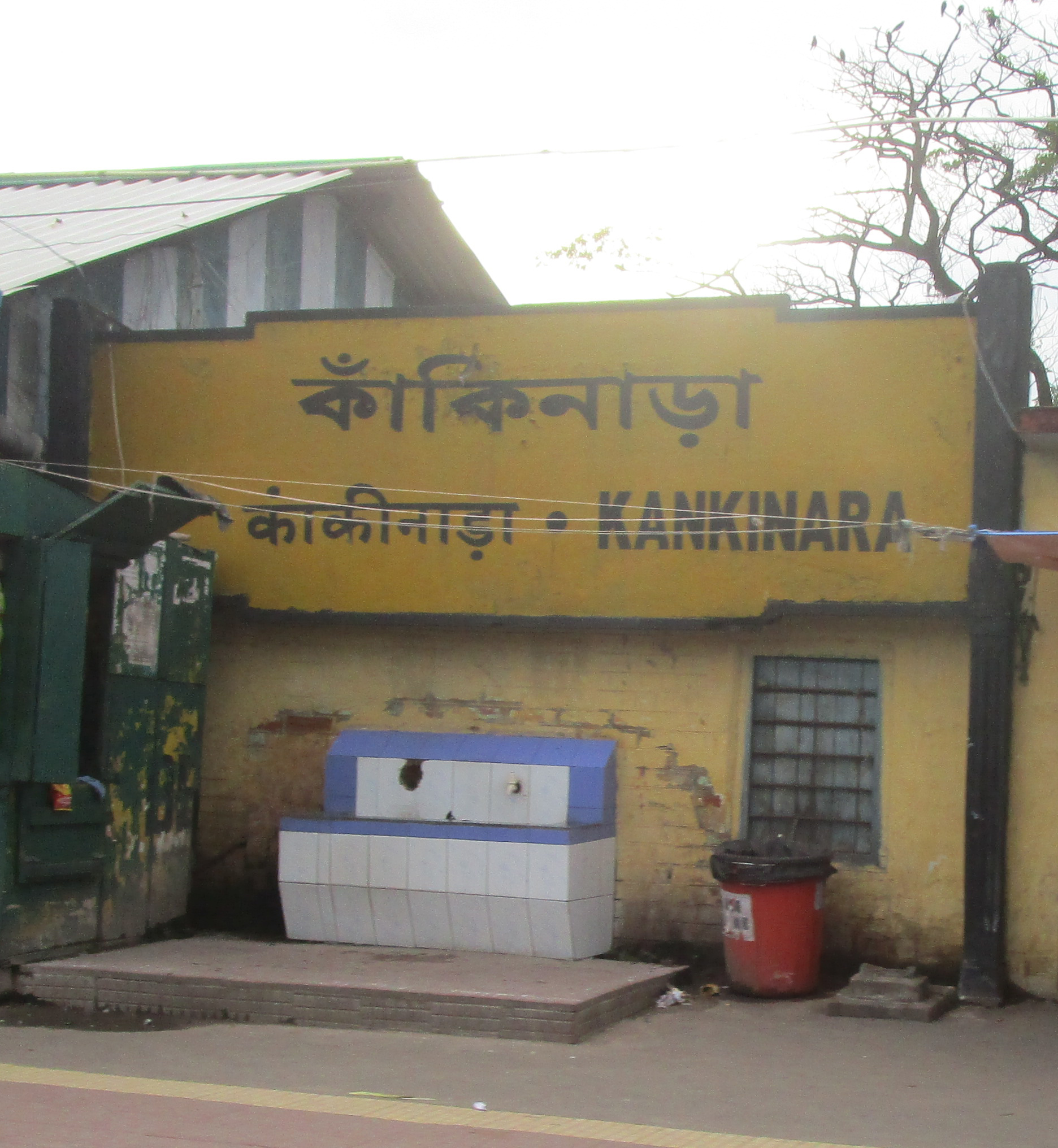

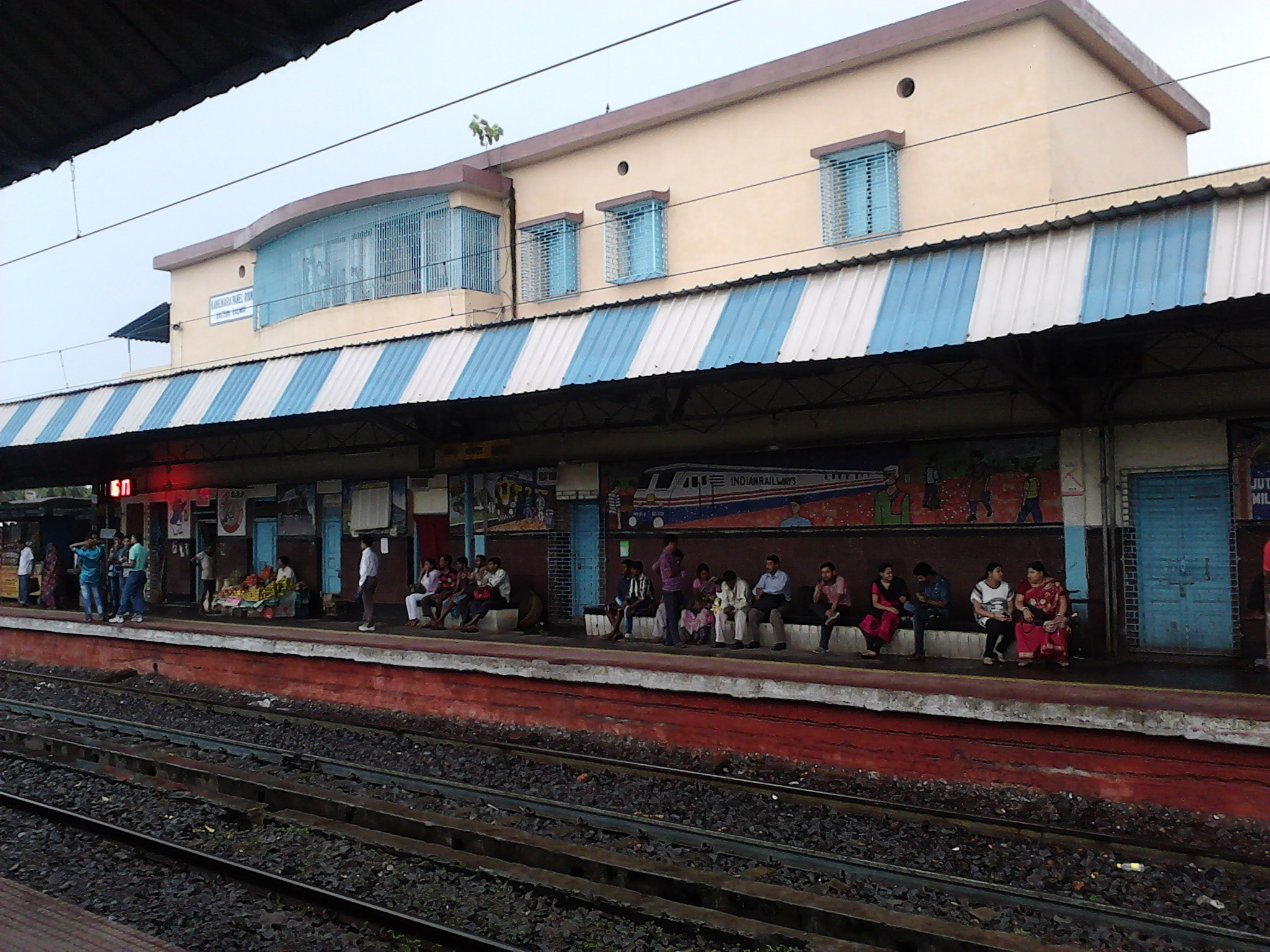
