= Payradanga =

- Sub-Township
- Location in West Bengal, India
- Coordinates: 23.1306°N 88.5457°E
- Country: India
- State: West Bengal
- District: Nadia

Government
  - Body: Legislative Council Of Ranaghat Dakshin(S.C.)
- Elevation: 7 m (23 ft)
- Demonym: Nadian

Languages
  - Official: Bengali, English, Hindi
- Time zone: UTC+5:30 (IST)
- PIN: 741247
- Vehicle registration: WB-51, WB-52

Payradanga is a village in Ranaghat I, a CD block and Ranaghat II Notified Area in the Ranaghat subdivision of the Nadia district of West Bengal, India.

== Geography ==
Cities and towns in Ranaghat subdivision of Nadia district
M: municipal town/ city/notified area, CT: census town, R: rural/ urban centre.
Owing to space constraints in the small map, the actual locations in a larger map may vary slightly

=== Location ===
Payradanga is located at 23.1306°N 88.5457°E.

Payradanga is not identified as a separate inhabited place in 2011 census. According to the map of Ranaghat I CD block in the District Census Handbook 2011, Nadia, Payradanga appears to be spread across Ukhil Nara mouza and Parbbatipur census town. Payradanga railway station is shown as being located in Parbbatipur.

=== Area overview ===
Nadia district is mostly alluvial plains lying to the east of Hooghly River, locally known as Bhagirathi. The alluvial plains are cut across by such distributaries as Jalangi, Churni and Ichhamati. With these rivers getting silted up, floods are a recurring feature. The Ranaghat subdivision has the Bhagirathi on the west, with Purba Bardhaman and Hooghly districts lying across the river. Topographically, Ranaghat subdivision is spread across the Krishnanagar-Santipur Plain, which occupies the central part of the district, and the Ranaghat-Chakdaha Plain, the low-lying area found in the south-eastern part of the district. The Churni separates the two plains. A portion of the east forms the boundary with Bangladesh. The lower portion of the east is covered by a portion of the North 24 Parganas district. The subdivision has achieved reasonably high urbanisation. 41.68% of the population lives in urban areas and 58.32% lives in rural areas.

Note: The map alongside presents some of the notable locations in the subdivision. All places marked in the map are linked in the larger full screen map. All the four subdivisions are presented with maps on the same scale – the size of the maps vary as per the area of the subdivision.
