= Belur railway station =

Railway station in West Bengal, India

Belur
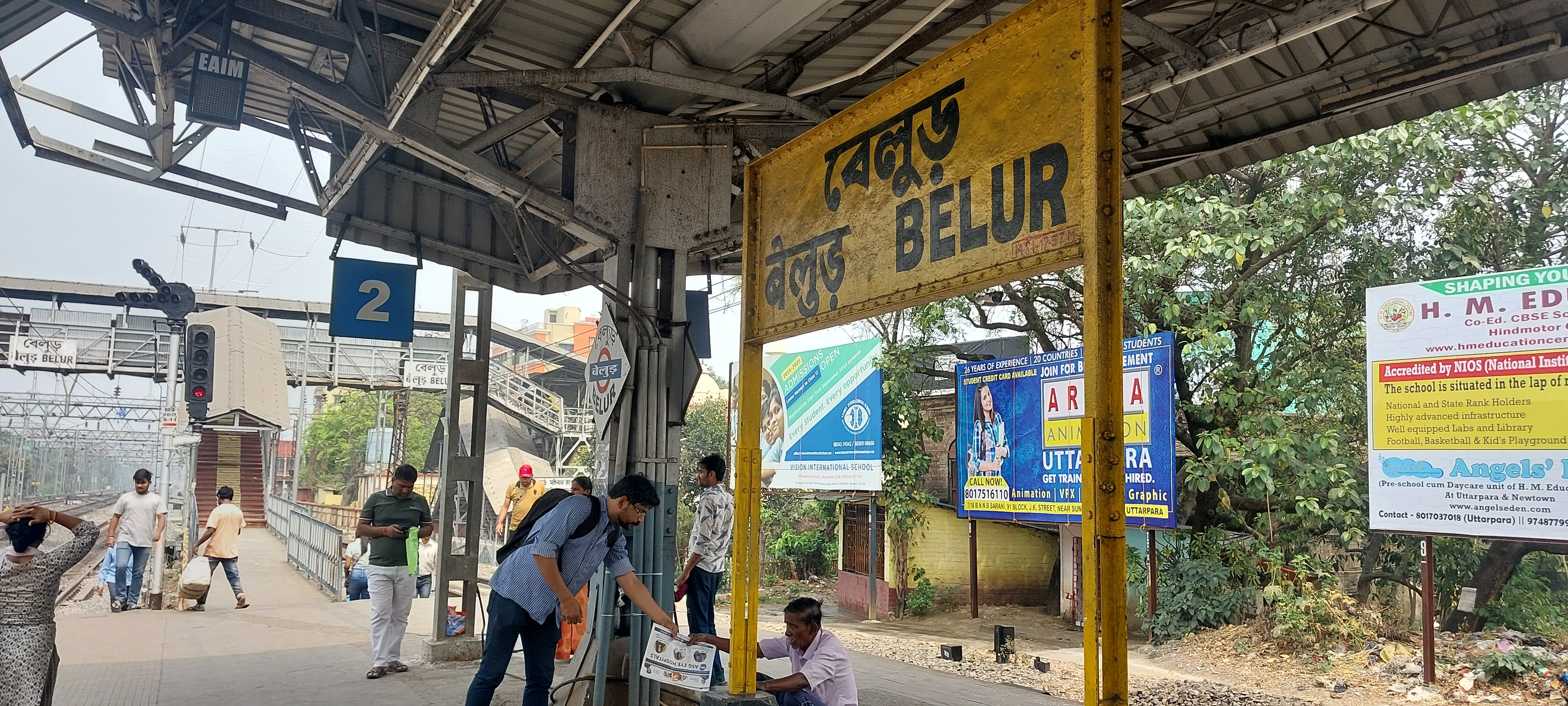
- Belur railway station

General information
- Location: Dharmatolla Road, Belur, Howrah, West Bengal; India
- Coordinates: 22°38′09″N 88°20′23″E
- Elevation: 18 metres (59 ft)
- System: Kolkata Suburban Railway
- Owner: Indian Railways
- Operator: Eastern Railway
- Lines: Howrah–Bardhaman main line Howrah–Bardhaman chord
- Platforms: 5

Construction
- Structure type: At grade
- Parking: Limited
- Cycle facilities: Available

Other information
- Status: Functioning
- Station code: BEQ
- Zone(s): Eastern Railway
- Division(s): Howrah

History
- Electrified: 1958
- Former names: East Indian Railway

Services
Preceding station	Kolkata Suburban Railway	Following station
Liluah towards Howrah Junction	Eastern Line Main line and Chord line	Bally towards Bandel Junction
Route map
Location
- Location within Kolkata Location within West Bengal Location within India

Belur railway station is a Kolkata Suburban Railway station on the Howrah–Bardhaman main line and Howrah–Bardhaman chord. It is located in Howrah in the state of West Bengal. It serves the town of Belur and the surrounding areas. It is 7 km from Howrah railway station.

== History ==
East Indian Railway Company started construction of a line out of Howrah for the proposed link with Delhi via Rajmahal and Mirzapur in 1851.

The first passenger train in eastern India ran from Howrah to Hooghly on 15 August 1854. The track was extended to Raniganj by 1855.

== Electrification ==
Electrification of Howrah–Burdwan main line was completed with 25 kV AC overhead system in 1958. The Howrah–Sheoraphuli–Tarakeswar line was electrified in 1957–58.

== See also ==
- Belur, West Bengal
- Belur Math
- Belur Math railway station
