= Shyamnagar railway station =

Railway station in West Bengal, India

Shyamnagar
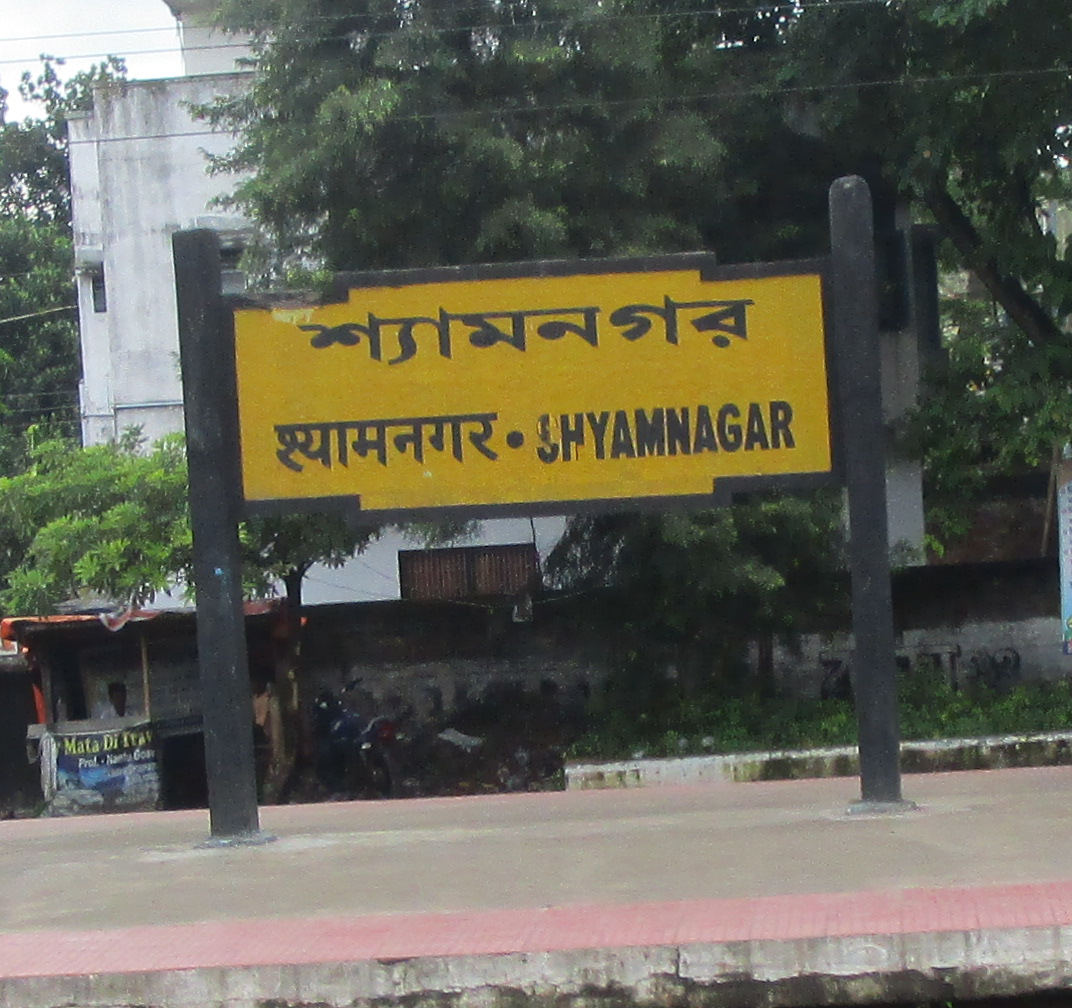
- Shyamnagar railway station

General information
- Location: Shyamnagar, North 24 Parganas district, West Bengal; India
- Coordinates: 22°49′43″N 88°22′49″E
- Elevation: 15 metres (49 ft)
- System: Kolkata Suburban Railway station
- Owner: Indian Railways
- Operator: Eastern Railway
- Line: Sealdah–Ranaghat line of Kolkata Suburban Railway
- Platforms: 4
- Tracks: 4

Construction
- Structure type: At grade
- Parking: Not available
- Cycle facilities: Not available

Other information
- Status: Functional
- Station code: SNR
- Zone(s): Eastern Railway
- Division(s): Sealdah

History
- Opened: 1862; 164 years ago
- Electrified: 1963–1965; 61 years ago

Services
Preceding station	Kolkata Suburban Railway	Following station
Ichhapur towards Sealdah	Eastern Line Main line	Jagaddal towards Ranaghat Junction
Route map
Location
- Location within West Bengal Location within India

Shyamnagar railway station is the railway station in the town of Shyamnagar. It serves the local areas of Shyamnagar in North 24 Parganas district, West Bengal, India.

== History ==
The Sealdah–Kusthia line of the Eastern Bengal Railway was opened to railway traffic in 1862; the Railway previously worked only on the eastern side of the Hooghly River.

== Trains ==
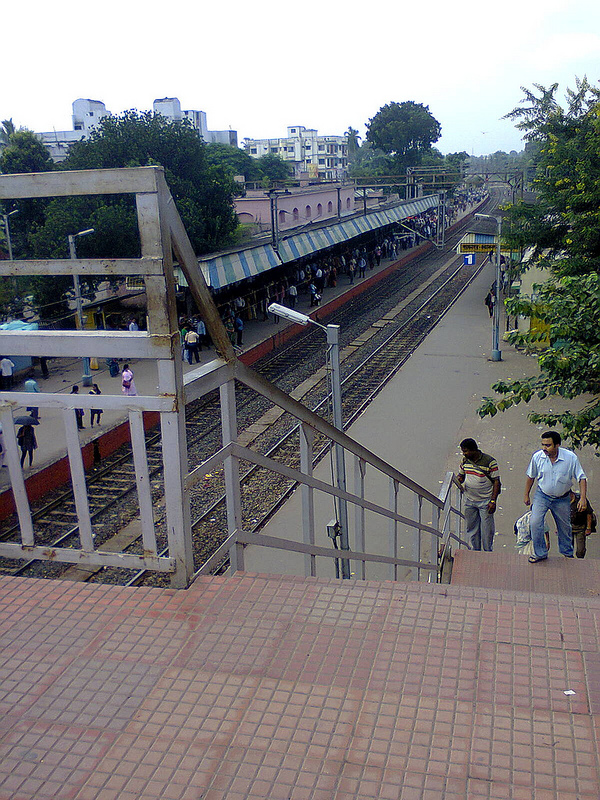
Foot overbridge at Shyamnagar railway station which connects platform number 1 (right hand) to the rest of the platforms 2, 3 and 4 (seen on left side).

One can board local and passenger trains every now and then from this station to go to Kolkata, Budge Budge, Majerhat, Katwa and so on. Not only the Sealdah–Bardhaman local (via Bandel station) but also all of the Sealdah main line local trains halt at this very station. The Maitree Express not only connecting just two cities, Kolkata and Dhaka but also two countries India and Bangladesh, passes through this railway station.

== Electrification ==
The Sealdah–Ranaghat sector underwent electrification from 1963 to 1965.
