= Kanchrapara Workshop Gate railway station =

Railway station in West Bengal, India

Kanchrapara Workshop Gate
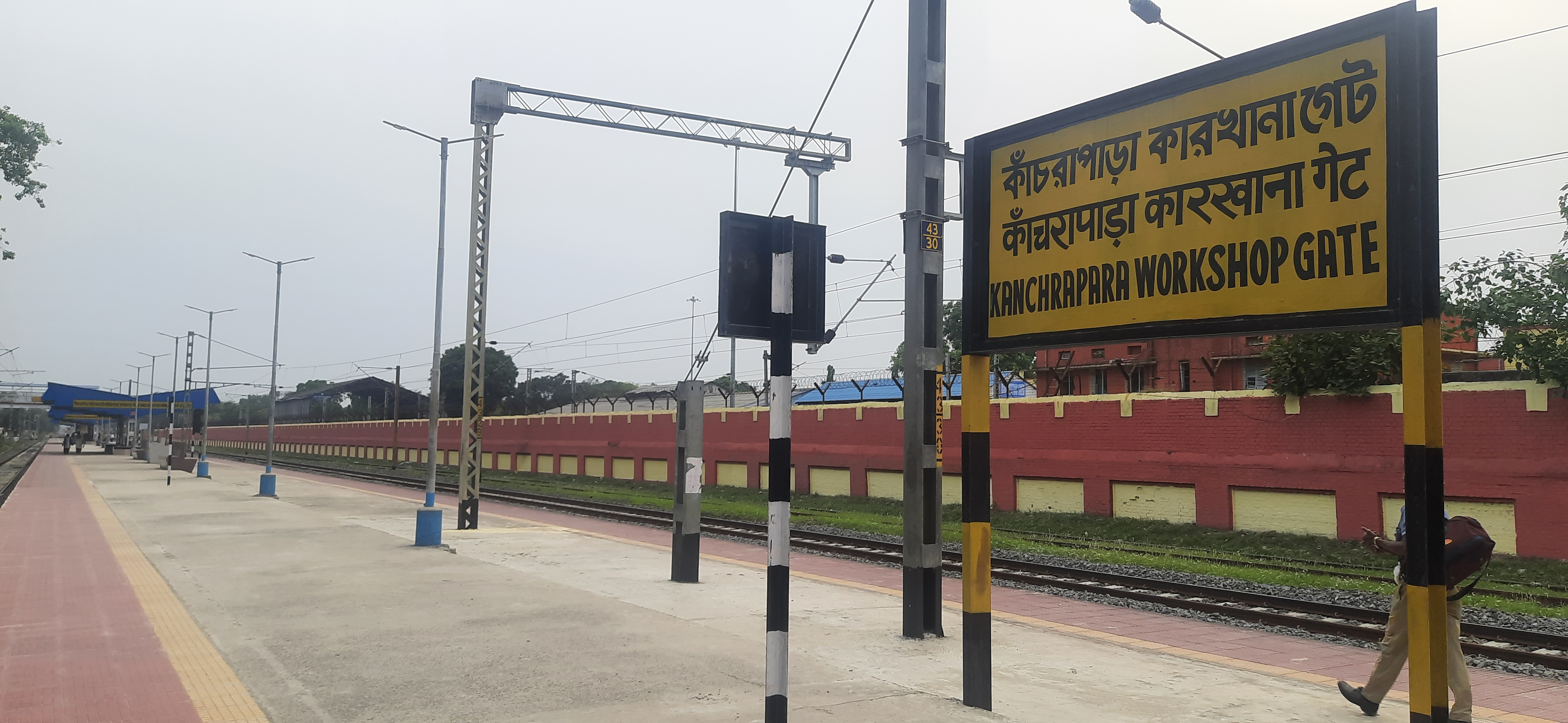
- Kanchrapara Workshop Gate railway station

General information
- Location: Kanchrapara, North 24 Parganas district, West Bengal; India
- Coordinates: 22°56′08″N 88°26′43″E
- Elevation: 17 metres (56 ft)
- System: Kolkata Suburban Railway station
- Owner: Indian Railways
- Operator: Eastern Railway
- Line: Sealdah–Ranaghat line of Kolkata Suburban Railway
- Platforms: 3
- Tracks: 3

Construction
- Structure type: Standard on ground station
- Parking: Not available
- Cycle facilities: Not available

Other information
- Status: Functional
- Station code: KPAW
- Zone(s): Eastern Railway
- Division(s): Sealdah

History
- Opened: 1862; 164 years ago
- Electrified: 1963–1965; 61 years ago
- Former names: Eastern Bengal Railway

Services
Preceding station	Kolkata Suburban Railway	Following station
Halisahar towards Sealdah	Eastern Line Main line	Kanchrapara towards Ranaghat Junction
Route map
Location
- Location within West Bengal Location within India

Kanchrapara Workshop Gate railway station is a railway station on the Sealdah Ranagahat line. Only during office peak hours trains halt here. This station has been mainly built for the workers of the Kanchrapara Railway Workshop.

== History ==
The Sealdah–Kusthia line of the Eastern Bengal Railway was opened to railway traffic in the year 1862. Eastern Bengal Railway used to work only on the eastern side of the Hooghly River.

The Kanchrapara Railway Workshop was established in the year 1863. It used to serve the Defence Department of the British Army for repairing aircraft and manufacturing armoured cars and grenades during World War II. The second five-year plan brought about drastic changes in diesel and electric traction. Electrification on the railway system in the eastern region required major repair and overhaul facilities for Electric Locos, EMU rolling stock since the early 1960s. Kanchrapara was selected to play the key role in all these spheres. In 1962 a decision was taken for remodelling Kanchrapara Workshop in order to make it a base workshop for electric locos, EMU rolling stock of Eastern and South Eastern Railways.

== Station complex ==
The platform is not sheltered. It lacks many facilities including water and sanitation. There is no proper approach road to this station.

== Electrification ==
The Sealdah–Ranaghat sector was electrified in 1963–65.
