= Eastern line (Kolkata Suburban Railway) =

Transit line in Kolkata, India

Eastern line

Overview
- Status: Operational
- Owner: Indian Railways
- Locale: Kolkata metropolitan region, India; Howrah district, Hooghly district, Purba Bardhaman district, Nadia district, North 24 Parganas, Murshidabad district
- Stations: 266

Service
- System: Kolkata Suburban Railway
- Operator: Eastern Railway
- Depots: Howrah; Bandel; Narkeldanga; Barasat; Ranaghat
- Daily ridership: ~17.5 lakh

History
- Opened: 15 August 1854; 171 years ago

Technical
- Line length: 906 km (563 mi)
- Number of tracks: 1\2\3\4
- Character: At-grade
- Track gauge: 5 ft 6 in (1,676 mm) broad gauge
- Electrification: 25,000 V AC; 1500 V DC (until 1957)
- Operating speed: upto 110 km\h

The Eastern lines of Kolkata Suburban Railway comprises 14 Local train routes that are operated by the Eastern Railway zone, serving the Kolkata metropolitan region and its neighbouring areas in West Bengal, India. The Line consists of a total 266 stations and the entire line is at grade. It mainly consists of two sections according to its division area and the main two terminal stations of Kolkata metropolitan region: the Howrah section, centered around Howrah railway station and the Sealdah Section centered around Sealdah railway station.

The line consists of a total of '14 corridors': 6 Corridors in the Howrah section, 7 corridors in the Sealdah section and there's a separate corridor connecting the two sections. In the Howrah Section first two corridors are from Howrah to Barddhaman- one via the Mainline through Bandel and the other via the Chord line through Dankuni, the third corridor runs from Howrah to Goghat via Seoraphuli Jn, while the fourth corridor connects Howrah to Katwa via Bandel Jn, there is one small fifth corridor also available between Howrah and Belur Math via Liluah and the sixth corridor runs between Barddhaman and Katwa. In the Sealdah section, among the 7 corridors the mainline runs from Sealdah to Gede, which is situated at the India-Bangladesh Border. The second corridor is from Sealdah to Krishnanagar City Jn via Ranaghat. The third corridor connects Shantipur to Sealdah via Ranaghat, The fourth one is from Bangaon to Sealdah via DumDum Jn, fifth one is connecting Hasnabad to Sealdah via DumDum Jn and Barasat Jn, the sixth line connects Sealdah to Kalyani Simanta via Kalyani railway station and the seventh corridor is a Single-track railway corridor between Ranaghat and Bangaon. The other line is the important Bandel–Naihati line which serves as a crucial link between the two sections of the eastern line.

The Major Carsheds on this line are at Howrah, Bandel, Narkeldanga, Barasat and Ranaghat on both of the sections.

== Stations with routes ==
=== Routes ===
The Eastern lines consists of the following sections with routes:

==== Howrah section ====
1. Howrah - Barddhaman (mainline via Bandel)
2. Howrah - Barddhaman (chord line via Dankuni)
3. Howrah - Goghat (via Seoraphuli)
4. Howrah - Katwa (via Bandel)
5. Howrah - Belur Math (via Liluah)
6. Barddhaman - Katwa

==== Sealdah section ====
1. Sealdah - Gede (via Ranaghat)
2. Sealdah - Krishnanagar City (via Ranaghat)
3. Sealdah - Shantipur (via Ranaghat)
4. Sealdah - Bangaon (via DumDum)
5. Sealdah - Hasnabad (via DumDum)
6. Sealdah - Kalyani Simanta (via Kalyani)
7. Bangaon - Ranaghat
8. Naihati - Bandel (connects two divisions)

=== Stations ===
Names in bold indicate that the station is a fast train stop as well as important terminal.

==== Howrah Section ====
===== 1. Howrah–Barddhaman main line =====
Howrah–Barddhaman Main line
#	Distance from Howrah Jn (km)	Station Name	Station Code	Connections
1	0	**Howrah**	HWH	^{†}South Eastern / Chord line / Belur Math Branch line (Eastern line)/ **Howrah**
2	5	Liluah	LLH	Chord line / Belur Math Branch line (Eastern line)
3	6	Belur	BEQ	Chord line (Eastern line)
4	8	Bally	BLY	Chord line (Eastern line)
5	10	Uttarpara	UPA	None
6	12	Hind Motor	HMZ	None
7	13	Konnagar	KOG	None
8	16	Rishra	RIS	None
9	20	Shrirampur	SRP	None
10	22	**Seoraphuli Junction**	SHE	Tarakeswar and Goghat (Eastern line)
11	24	Baidyabati	BBAE	None
12	28	Bhadreshwar	BHR	None
13	30	Mankundu	MUU	None
14	33	Chandan Nagar	CGR	None
15	36	Chuchura	CNS	None
16	38	Hooghly	HGY	None
17	39	**Bandel Junction**	BDC	Katwa (Eastern line)
18	43	Adi Saptagram	ADST	None
19	47	Magra	MUG	None
20	50	Talandu	TLO	None
21	55	Khanyan	KHN	None
22	61	Pundooah	PDA	None
23	66	Simlagarh	SLG	None
24	68	Bainchigram	BCGM	None
25	70	Bainchi	BOI	None
26	75	Debipur	DBP	None
27	79	Bagila	BGF	None
28	82	Memari	MYM	None
29	85	Nimo	NMF	None
30	88	Rasulpur	RSLR	None
31	92	Palsit	PLAE	None
32	95	Saktigarh	SKG	Chord line (Eastern line)
33	100	Gangpur	GRP	Chord line (Eastern line)
34	107	**Barddhaman Junction**	BWN	Chord line / Katwa (Eastern line)

†Howrah Junction railway station is a terminus for South Eastern Railway and Eastern Railway.

===== 2. Howrah–Bardhaman chord line =====
Chord line
#	Distance from Howrah Jn (km)	Station Name	Station Code	Connections
1	0	**Howrah**	HWH	South Eastern / Main line / Belur Math Branch line (Eastern line)/ **Howrah**
2	5	Liluah		Main line / Belur Math Branch line (Eastern line)
3	6	Belur		Main line (Eastern line)
4	8	Bally		Main line (Eastern line)
5	11	Belanagar		None
6	15	**Dankuni Junction**	DKAE	Chord link
7	17	Gobra		None
8	20	Janai Road		None
9	22	Begampur		None
10	26	Baruipara		None
11	29	Mirzapur-Bankipur		None
12	31	Balarambati		None
13	33	Kamarkundu		Seoraphuli/ Tarakeswar/ Goghat (Eastern line)
14	36	Madhusudanpur		None
15	40	**Chandanpur**	CDAE	None
16	45	Porabazar		None
17	46	Belmuri		None
18	49	Dhaniakhali		None
19	51	Sibaichandi		None
20	53	Cheragram		None
21	55	Hajigarh		None
22	58	Gurap		None
23	62	Jhapandanga		None
24	65	Jaugram		None
25	69	Nabagram		None
26	72	**Masagram**	MSAE	None
27	75	Chanchai		None
28	78	Palla Road		None
29	83	Saktigarh		Main line (Eastern line)
30	88	Gangpur		Main line (Eastern line)
31	95	**Barddhaman Junction**	BWN	Main line / Katwa (Eastern line)

===== 3. Howrah–Goghat line =====
Howrah–Goghat line
#	Distance from Howrah Jn (km)	Station Name	Station Code	Connections
1	0	**Howrah**	HWH	**Howrah**
2	4	Liluah		Towards Belur Math
3	6	Belur		None
4	8	Bally		None
5	9	Uttarpara		None
6	11	Hindmotor		None
7	13	Konnagar		None
8	16	Rishra		None
9	19	Shrirampur		None
10	21	**Seoraphuli Junction**^{†}	SHE	Main line (Eastern line)
11	27	Diara		None
12	29	Nasibpur		None
13	33	Singur		None
14	35	Kamarkundu		Chord line (Eastern line)
15	39	Nalikul		None
16	43	Maliya		None
17	44	Haripal		None
18	47	Kaikala		None
19	50	Bahirkhanda		None
20	54	Loknath		None
21	56	**Tarakeswar**	TAK	None
22	61	Talpur		None
23	66	Takipur		None
24	72	Mayapur		None
25	81	Arambagh	AMBG	None
26	91	**Goghat**	GOGT	None
† – Branch Line starts at Seoraphuli

===== 4. Howrah–Katwa line =====
Howrah–Katwa line
#	Distance from Howrah (km)	Station Name	Station Code	Connections
1	0	**Howrah**	HWH	Chord line / Belur Math Branch line (Eastern line)/ **Howrah**
2	4	Liluah	LLH	Chord line / Belur Math Branch line (Eastern line)
3	6	Belur	BEQ	Chord line (Eastern line)
4	8	Bally	BLY	Chord line (Eastern line)
5	9	Uttarpara	UPA	None
6	11	Hind Motor	HMZ	None
7	13	Konnagar	KOG	None
8	16	Rishra	RIS	None
9	19	**Shrirampur**	SRP	None
10	21	**Seoraphuli Junction**	SHE	Tarakeswar and Goghat (Eastern line)
11	24	Baidyabati	BBAE	None
12	28	Bhadreshwar	BHR	None
13	30	Mankundu	MUU	None
14	32	Chandannagar	CGR	None
15	35	Chuchura	CNS	None
16	37	Hooghly	HGY	None
17	39	**Bandel Junction**^{†}	BDC	Main line (Eastern line)
18	43	Bans Beria		None
19	45	Islampara Halt		None
20	47	Tribeni		None
21	50	Kuntighat		None
22	54	Dumurdaha		None
23	56	Khamargachi		None
24	61	Jirat		None
25	64	Balagarh		None
26	67	Somra Bazar		None
27	72	Behula		None
28	74	Guptipara		None
29	81	Ambika Kalna	ABKA	None
30	85	Baghnapara		None
31	90	Dhatrigram		None
32	93	Nandaigram		None
33	97	Samudragarh		None
34	100	Kalinagar		None
35	105	Nabadwip Dham	NDAE	None
36	106	Bishnupriya		None
37	110	Bhandartikuri		None
38	112	Purbasthali		None
39	115	Mertala Phaleya		None
40	118	Lakshmipur		None
41	121	Belerhat		None
42	126	Patuli		None
43	131	Agradwip		None
44	134	Sahebtala		None
45	137	Dainhat		None
46	144	**Katwa Junction**	KWAE	Barddhaman (Eastern line)
† – Branch Line starts at Bandel

===== 5. Howrah–Belur Math Line =====
Howrah–Belur Math Line
#	Distance from Howrah Jn (km)	Station Name	Station Code	Connections
1	0	**Howrah**†	HWH	^{†}South Eastern/ Main line / Chord line (Eastern line)/ **Howrah**
2	5	Liluah		Main line / Chord line (Eastern line)
3	7	**Belur Math**	BRMH	None
† – Branch Line starts at Howrah

===== 6. Barddhaman–Katwa line =====
Barddhaman–Katwa line
#	Distance from Barddhaman Jn (km)	Station Name	Station Code	Connections
1	0	**Barddhaman Junction**^{†}	BWN	Main/Chord line (Eastern line)
2	6	Kamnara		None
3	8	Khetia		None
4	10	Chamardighi		None
5	11	Karjana		None
6	12	Karjanagram		None
7	14	Amarun		None
8	19	Bhatar		None
9	25	Balgona	BGNA	None
10	29	Saota		None
11	31	Nigan		None
12	35	Kaichar Halt		None
13	40	Bankapasi		None
14	44	Shrikhanda		None
15	45	Shripat Shrikhanda		None
16	52	**Katwa Junction**	KWAE	Bandel (Eastern line)
† – Branch Line starts at Barddhaman

==== Sealdah Section ====
===== 1. Sealdah–Gede Main Line =====
Sealdah–Gede Main line
#	Distance from Sealdah (km)	Station Name	Station Code	Connections
1	0	**Sealdah**	SDAH	Chord link / Sealdah South/ **Sealdah**
2	3	Bidhannagar Road	BNXR	Chord link / Circular
3	6	**Dum Dum Junction**	DDJ	Chord link / Circular/ Bangaon and Hasnabad (Eastern line)/ Dum Dum
4	11	Belgharia		None
5	13	Agarpara		None
6	15	Sodpur		None
7	18	Khardaha		None
8	20	Titagarh		None
9	22	**Barrackpore**	BP	None
10	24	Palta		None
11	27	Ichhapur		None
12	30	Shyamnagar		None
13	33	Jagaddal		None
14	35	Kankinara		None
15	37	**Naihati Junction**	NH	Bandel (Eastern line)
16	42	Halisahar		None
17	43	Kanchrapara Workshop Gate		None
18	45	Kanchrapara		None
19	48	Kalyani	KYI	Kalyani Simanta (Eastern line)
20	52	Madanpur		None
21	57	Simurali		None
22	59	Palpara		None
23	61	Chakdaha		None
24	67	Payradanga		None
25	73	**Ranaghat Junction**	RHA	Bangaon, Krishnanagar & Shantipur (Eastern line)
26	77	Bankimnagar		None
27	79	Pancheberia		None
28	82	Aranghata		None
29	86	Bahirgachhi		None
30	88	Shantinagar		None
31	90	Bhayna		None
32	93	Bagula		None
33	96	Mayurhat		None
34	99	Taraknagar		None
35	105	Majhdia		None
36	111	Banpur		None
37	113	Harishnagar		None
38	116	**Gede**	GEDE	None

===== 2. Sealdah–Krishnanagar City line =====
Sealdah–Krishnanagar City line
#	Distance from Sealdah (km)	Station Name	Station Code	Connections
1	0	**Sealdah**	SDAH	Chord link / Sealdah South / **Sealdah**
2	3	Bidhannagar Road	BNXR	Chord link / Circular
3	6	**Dum Dum Junction**	DDJ	Chord link / Circular / Bangaon and Hasnabad (Eastern line)/ Dum Dum
4	11	Belgharia		None
5	13	Agarpara		None
6	15	Sodpur		None
7	18	Khardaha		None
8	20	Titagarh		None
9	22	**Barrackpore**	BP	None
10	24	Palta		None
11	27	Ichhapur		None
12	30	Shyamnagar		None
13	33	Jagaddal		None
14	35	Kankinara		None
15	37	**Naihati Junction**	NH	Bandel (Eastern line)
16	42	Halisahar		None
17	43	Kanchrapara Workshop Gate		None
18	45	Kanchrapara		None
19	48	Kalyani	KYI	Kalyani Simanta (Eastern line)
20	52	Madanpur		None
21	57	Simurali		None
22	59	Palpara		None
23	61	Chakdaha		None
24	67	Payradanga		None
25	73	**Ranaghat Junction**^{†}	RHA	Main (Eastern line)
26	77	Kalinarayanpur Junction		Shantipur (Eastern line)
27	81	Birnagar		None
28	84	Taherpur		None
29	89	Badkulla		None
30	94	Jalal Khali		None
31	99	**Krishnanagar City Junction**	KNJ	Shantipur (Eastern line)
† – **Sealdah - Gede main line** till Ranaghat

===== 3. Sealdah–Shantipur Line =====
Sealdah–Shantipur line
#	Distance from Kalinarayanpur (km)	Station Name	Station Code	Connections
1	0	**Sealdah**	SDAH	Chord link / Sealdah South / **Sealdah**
2	3	Bidhannagar Road	BNXR	Chord link / Circular
3	6	**Dum Dum Junction**	DDJ	Chord link / Circular/ Bangaon and Hasnabad (Eastern line)/ Dum Dum
4	11	Belgharia		None
5	13	Agarpara		None
6	15	Sodpur		None
7	18	Khardaha		None
8	20	Titagarh		None
9	22	**Barrackpore**	BP	None
10	24	Palta		None
11	27	Ichhapur		None
12	30	Shyamnagar		None
13	33	Jagaddal		None
14	35	Kankinara		None
15	37	**Naihati Junction**	NH	Bandel (Eastern line)
16	42	Halisahar		None
17	43	Kanchrapara Workshop Gate		None
18	45	Kanchrapara		None
19	48	Kalyani	KYI	Kalyani Simanta (Eastern line)
20	52	Madanpur		None
21	57	Simurali		None
22	59	Palpara		None
23	61	Chakdaha		None
24	67	Payradanga		None
25	73	**Ranaghat Junction**^{†}	RHA	Main (Eastern line)
26	77	Kalinarayanpur Junction^{†}		Ranaghat and Krishnanagar (Eastern line)
27	81	Habibpur		None
28	86	Phulia	FLU	None
29	89	Bathna Krittibas		None
30	93	**Shantipur**	STB	None
† – Branch Line starts at Kalinarayanpur

===== 4. Sealdah–Bangaon Line =====
Sealdah - Bangaon line
#	Distance from Sealdah (km)	Station Name	Station Code	Connections
1	0	**Sealdah**	SDAH	Chord link / Sealdah South / **Sealdah**
2	3	Bidhannagar Road	BNXR	Chord link / Circular
3	6	**Dum Dum Junction**^{†}	DDJ	Chord link / Circular /Main (Eastern line)/ Dum Dum
4	9	Dum Dum Cantonment	DDC	Dum Dum Cantonment
5	11	Durganagar		None
6	13	Birati	BBT	None
7	14	Bisharpara Kodaliya		None
8	16	New Barrackpore		None
9	17	Madhyamgram		None
10	20	Hridaypur		None
11	22	**Barasat Junction**	BT	Hasnabad (Eastern line)
12	25	Bamangachhi		None
13	29	**Duttapukur**	DTK	None
14	33	Bira		None
15	37	Guma		None
16	40	Ashoknagar Road		None
17	44	**Habra**	HB	None
18	49	Sanhati		None
19	53	Machhalandapur		None
20	57	**Gobardanga**	GBG	None
21	62	Thakurnagar	TKNR	None
22	66	Chandpara		None
23	71	Bibhuti Bhushan Halt		None
24	76	**Bangaon**	BNJ	Ranaghat (Eastern line)
† – **Sealdah - Gede Main Line** till Dum Dum Junction

===== 5. Sealdah–Hasnabad Line =====
Sealdah–Hasnabad line
#	Distance from Barasat (km)	Station Name	Station Code	Connections
1	0	**Barasat Junction**^{†}	BT	Dum Dum and Bangaon (Eastern line)
2	3	Kazipara		None
3	6	Karea Kadambagachhi		None
4	10	Bahira Kalibari		None
5	12	Sondalia		None
6	15	Beliaghata Road		None
7	18	Lebutala		None
8	20	Bhasila		None
9	24	Harua Road		None
10	27	Kankra Mirzanagar		None
11	31	Malatipur		None
12	33	Ghora Ras Ghona		None
13	36	Champapukur		None
14	41	Bhyabla Halt		None
15	42	Basirhat		None
16	45	Matania Anantapur		None
17	47	Madhyampur		None
18	48	Nimdanri		None
19	51	Taki Road		None
20	53	**Hasnabad**	HNB	None
† – Branch Line starts at Barasat Junction

===== 6. Sealdah–Kalyani Simanta line =====
Sealdah–Kalyani Simanta line
#	Distance from Sealdah (km)	Station Name	Station Code	Connections
1	0	**Sealdah**	SDAH	Chord link / Sealdah South/ **Sealdah**
2	3	Bidhannagar Road	BNXR	Chord link / Circular
3	6	**Dum Dum Junction**	DDJ	Chord link / Circular/ Bangaon and Hasnabad (Eastern line)/ Dum Dum
4	11	Belgharia		None
5	13	Agarpara		None
6	15	Sodpur		None
7	18	Khardaha		None
8	20	Titagarh		None
9	22	**Barrackpore**	BP	None
10	24	Palta		None
11	27	Ichhapur		None
12	30	Shyamnagar		None
13	33	Jagaddal		None
14	35	Kankinara		None
15	37	**Naihati Junction**	NH	Bandel (Eastern line)
16	42	Halisahar		None
17	43	Kanchrapara Workshop Gate		None
18	45	Kanchrapara		None
19	48	Kalyani^{†}	KYI	Main (Eastern line)
20	49	Kalyani Silpanchal		None
21	51	Kalyani Ghoshpara		None
22	52	**Kalyani Simanta**	KLYM	None
† – **Sealdah -Gede Main Line** till Kalyani

===== 7. Ranaghat–Bangaon Line =====
Ranaghat–Bangaon line
#	Distance from Ranaghat (km)	Station Name	Station Code	Connections
1	0	**Ranaghat Junction**^{†}	RHA	Main/ Krishnanagar/Shantipur (Eastern line)
2	3	Coopers Halt		None
3	5	Naba Raynagar Halt		None
4	9	Gangnapur		None
5	14	Majhergram		None
6	18	Akaipur Halt		None
7	22	Gopal Nagar		None
8	28	Satberia		None
9	32	**Bangaon**	BNJ	Dum Dum (Eastern line)
† – Branch Line starts at Ranaghat

===== Hooghly Branch line =====
Hooghly Branch line
#	Distance from Naihati (km)	Station Name	Station Code	Connections
1	0	**Naihati Junction**^{†}	NH	Sealdah Main (Eastern line)
2	3	Garifa		None
3	5	Hooghly Ghat		None
4	8	**Bandel Junction**^{†}	BDC	Howrah Main (Eastern line)
† – Branch Line starts at Naihati and Ends at Bandel

===== Far North Branch line =====
Far North Branch line
#	Distance from Krishnanagar City Junction (km)	Station Name	Station Code	Connections
1	0	**Krishnanagar City Junction**	KNJ	Ranaghat (Eastern line)
2	7	Bahadurpur		None
3	12	Dhubulia		None
4	18	Muragacha		None
5	28	Bethuadahari		None
6	32	Sonadanga		None
7	40	Debagram		None
8	44	Paglachandi		None
9	50	Plassey		None
10	55	Siraj Nagar Halt		None
11	59	Rejinagar		None
12	68	Beldanga		None
13	74	Bhabta		None
14	77	Sargachi		None
15	80	New Balarampur Halt		None
16	85	Berhampore Court		None
17	89	Cossimbazar		None
18	96	Murshidabad		None
19	100	Nashipur Road		None
20	103	Jiaganj		None
21	108	Subarnamrigi		None
22	115	Bhagwangola		None
23	119	Pirtala		None
24	125	Krishnapur		None
25	127	**Lalgola**		None
† – Branch Line starts at Krishnanagar City Junction

== Electrification ==
From 1957, The Eastern Railway Started Electrification at Howrah - Tarakeswar Route with 1500 V DC later it was converted to 25000 V AC 50 Hz in 1967–68, after that the work goes also on the chord line, Barddhaman & Bandel To Katwa line of Howrah Division, which is now fully electrified.

And on the Sealdah Division of Eastern Railway, the electrification process was started in 1963 from Sealdah to Ranaghat line, Dum Dum To Bangaon and the other lines in this division with the different phases and completed up to 1965 from that time the whole division is also fully electrified.

== Services ==
Currently in 2017–18 all services of the Eastern line running on 9 and 12 Cars. Sealdah section has 461 Services of 9 rakes EMU and 452 Services of 12 Rakes EMU and also on Howrah Section has 398 Services of 12 Rakes EMU. Which It Handles the 100% Suburban Network of Eastern Railways.

== See also ==
- Kolkata Suburban Railway
- List of Kolkata Suburban Railway stations
- Eastern Railway zone
