= Konnagar railway station =

Railway station in West Bengal, India

Konnagar
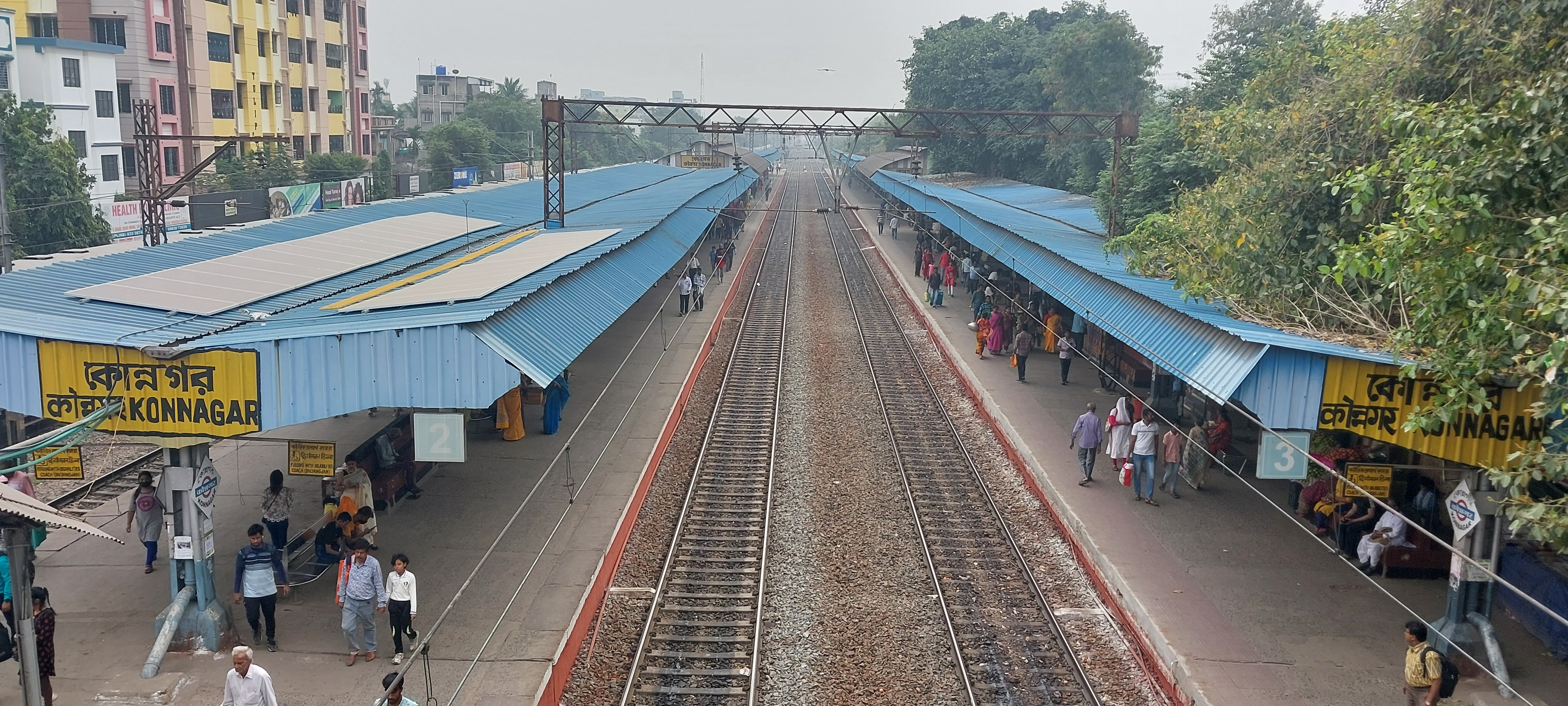
- Konnagar railway station

General information
- Location: Indira Gandhi Road, Konnagar, Hooghly – 712235; West Bengal; India
- Coordinates: 22°42′03″N 88°20′33″E
- Elevation: 17 metres (56 ft)
- System: Kolkata Suburban Railway station
- Owner: Indian Railways
- Operator: Eastern Railway
- Line: Howrah–Bardhaman main line
- Platforms: 3

Construction
- Structure type: At grade
- Parking: Yes
- Cycle facilities: Yes

Other information
- Status: Functioning
- Station code: KOG
- Zone(s): Eastern Railway
- Division(s): Howrah

History
- Opened: 1854
- Electrified: 1958
- Former names: East Indian Railway Company

Services
Preceding station	Kolkata Suburban Railway	Following station
Hindmotor towards Howrah Junction	Eastern Line Main line	Rishra towards Bandel Junction
Route map
Location
- Location within West Bengal Location within India

Konnagar railway station is located on the Howrah–Bardhaman main line, in Hooghly district, West Bengal, India. It serves Konnagar Town. It has 3 platforms and it was electrified in 1958.
