= Madanpur railway station =

Railway station in West Bengal, India

Madanpur
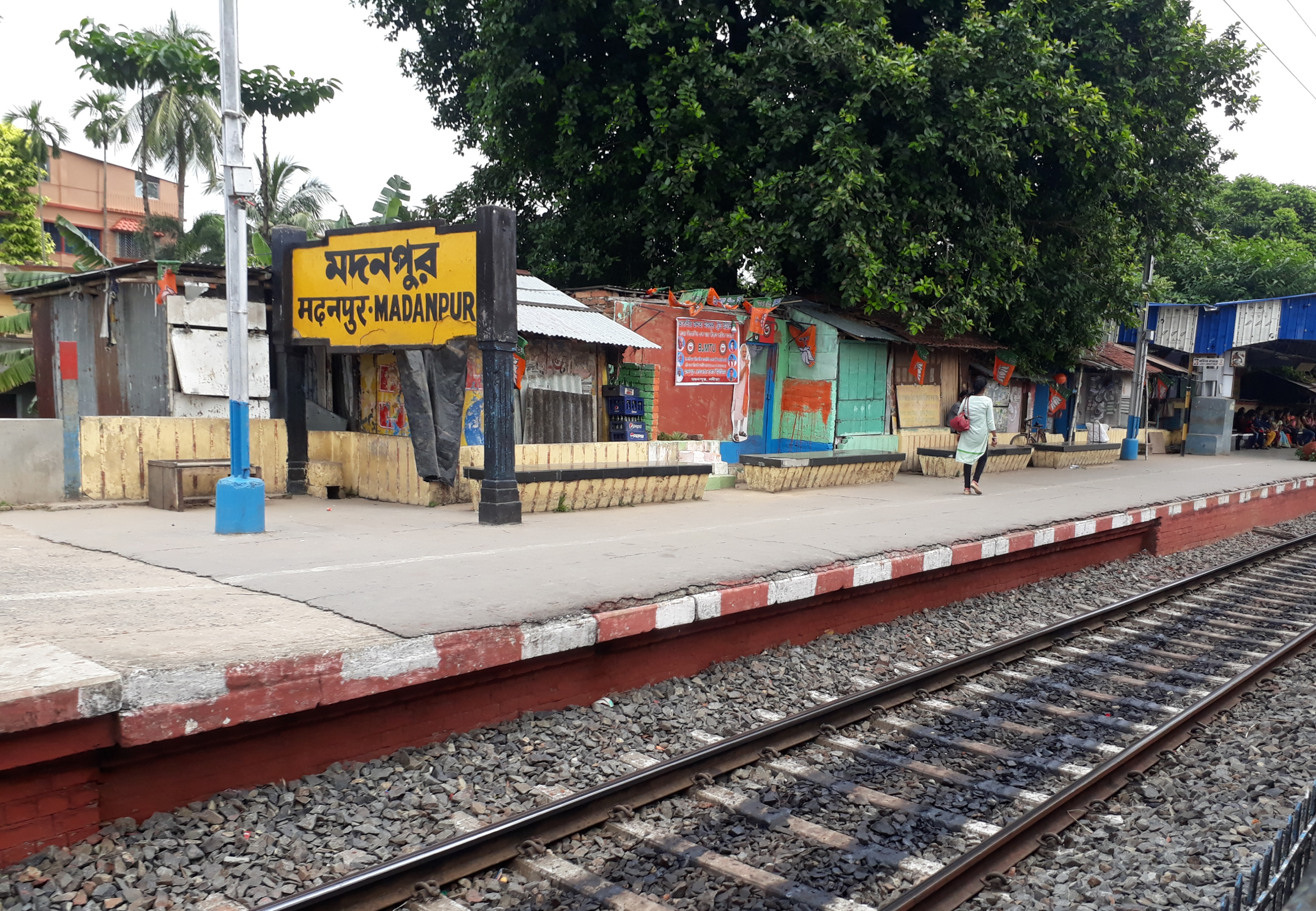
- Madanpur railway station

General information
- Location: Madanpur, Nadia, West Bengal; India
- Coordinates: 23°00′22″N 88°29′24″E
- Elevation: 13 metres (43 ft)
- System: Kolkata Suburban Railway station
- Owner: Indian Railways
- Operator: Eastern Railway
- Line: Sealdah–Ranaghat line of Kolkata Suburban Railway
- Platforms: 2
- Tracks: 2

Construction
- Structure type: Standard on ground station
- Parking: Not available
- Cycle facilities: Not available
- Accessible: Not available

Other information
- Status: Functional
- Station code: MPJ
- Zone(s): Eastern Railway
- Division(s): Sealdah

History
- Opened: 1862; 164 years ago
- Electrified: 1963–1965; 61 years ago
- Former names: Eastern Bengal Railway

Services
Preceding station	Kolkata Suburban Railway	Following station
Kalyani towards Sealdah	Eastern Line Main line	Simurali towards Ranaghat Junction
Route map
Location
- Location within West Bengal Location within India

Madanpur railway station is a railway station on the Sealdah Ranaghat line. It serves the local areas of Madanpur in the Nadia district of West Bengal.

== History ==
The Sealdah–Kusthia line of the Eastern Bengal Railway was opened to railway traffic in the year 1862. Eastern Bengal Railway used to work only on the eastern side of the Hooghly River. The Sealdah–Ranaghat sector was electrified in 1963–65.

== Facilities ==
The platform is not well sheltered. It lacks many facilities including water and sanitation.
