= Hindmotor flag railway station =

Railway station in West Bengal, India

Hindmotor

General information
- Location: RG Nagar Road, Deshbandhu Park, Hind Motor, Uttarpara Kotrung, Hooghly district, West Bengal; India
- Coordinates: 22°41′02″N 88°20′31″E
- Elevation: 9 metres (30 ft)
- System: Kolkata Suburban Railway station
- Owner: Indian Railways
- Operator: Eastern Railway
- Line: Kolkata Suburban Railway
- Platforms: 3
- Tracks: 3

Construction
- Structure type: Standard (on-ground station)
- Parking: No
- Cycle facilities: No

Other information
- Status: Operational
- Station code: HMZ
- Zone(s): Eastern Railway
- Division(s): Howrah

Services
Preceding station	Kolkata Suburban Railway	Following station
Uttarpara towards Howrah Junction	Eastern Line Main line	Konnagar towards Bandel Junction
Route map
Location
- Location within West Bengal Location within India

Hindmotor railway station is a small railway station in Hooghly district, West Bengal. Its code is HMZ. It serves Hind Motor area.
