= Kanchrapara railway station =

Railway station in West Bengal, India

Kanchrapara
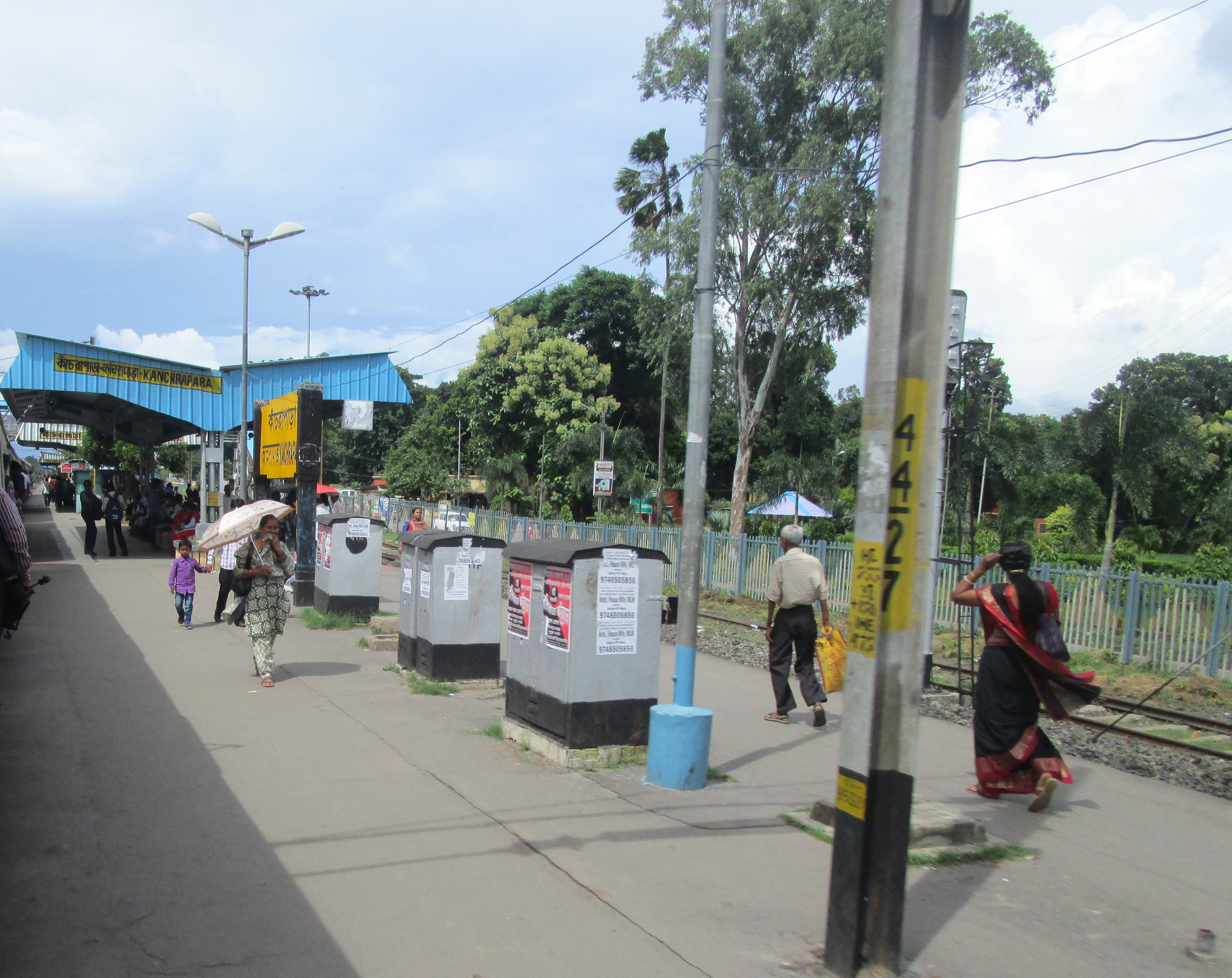
- Kanchrapara railway station

General information
- Location: Station Road, Kanchrapara, North 24 Parganas district, West Bengal; India
- Coordinates: 22.946123°N 88.451395°E
- Elevation: 16 metres (52 ft)
- System: Kolkata Suburban Railway
- Owner: Indian Railways
- Operator: Eastern Railway
- Line: Sealdah–Ranaghat line of Kolkata Suburban Railway
- Platforms: 3
- Tracks: 3

Construction
- Structure type: Standard (on-ground station)
- Parking: Available
- Cycle facilities: Available
- Accessible: Not available

Other information
- Status: Functioning
- Station code: KPA
- Zone(s): Eastern Railway
- Division(s): Sealdah

History
- Opened: 1862; 164 years ago
- Electrified: 1963–1965; 61 years ago
- Former names: Eastern Bengal Railway

Passengers
- 17000 (approx.)

Services
Preceding station	Kolkata Suburban Railway	Following station
Kanchrapara Workshop Gate towards Sealdah	Eastern Line Main line	Kalyani towards Ranaghat Junction
Route map
Location
- Location within West Bengal Location within India

Kanchrapara railway station is a Kolkata Suburban Railway station in Kanchrapara on the Sealdah–Ranaghat line. It is situated in North 24 Parganas district, on the outskirts of Kolkata in the state of West Bengal, India. It mainly serves the Greater Kanchrapara town region and the surrounding areas. This is a considerably important station on the Sealdah–Ranaghat line because of the existence of the Kanchrapara Railway Workshop. There were plans of making this crowded station a junction stop, but this has not been initiated yet, mainly due to the less space available to expand the station. The distance between Sealdah railway station and Kanchrapara station is about 45 km.

== History ==
The Calcutta (Sealdah)–Kusthia line of Eastern Bengal Railway was opened to run in 1862. Eastern Bengal Railway worked on the eastern side of the Hooghly River. Kanchrapara Railway Workshop was established in 1863. It served the defense department for repairs to aircraft and manufacture of armoured cars and grenade shells during World War II. The second 5-year plan brought about drastic changes in diesel and electric traction. Electrification on the railway system in the eastern region necessitated major repair and overhaul facilities for electric loco, EMU rolling stock from early 1960s. Kanchrapara was selected to play the key role in these spheres. In 1962 a decision was taken for remodelling Kanchrapara Workshop in order to make it a base workshop for electric locos, electrical multiple unit stocks of Eastern and South Eastern Railways. With this, the station was established. In 1979, the rail line was extended from the main Kalyani railway station to Kalyani Simanta station and also established direct connectivity to Kolkata through Kalyani Simanta local EMU trains.

== Station complex ==
The platform is sheltered. It has water, toilet and waiting room but no proper parking zone. The Station Road terminates in the Main Gate of this station. Current number of Platforms is 2, though construction of a 3rd platform is underway.

== Electrification ==
The Sealdah–Ranaghat route was electrified in the period of 1963–65.
