= Saktigarh railway station =

Railway station in West Bengal, India

Shaktigarh
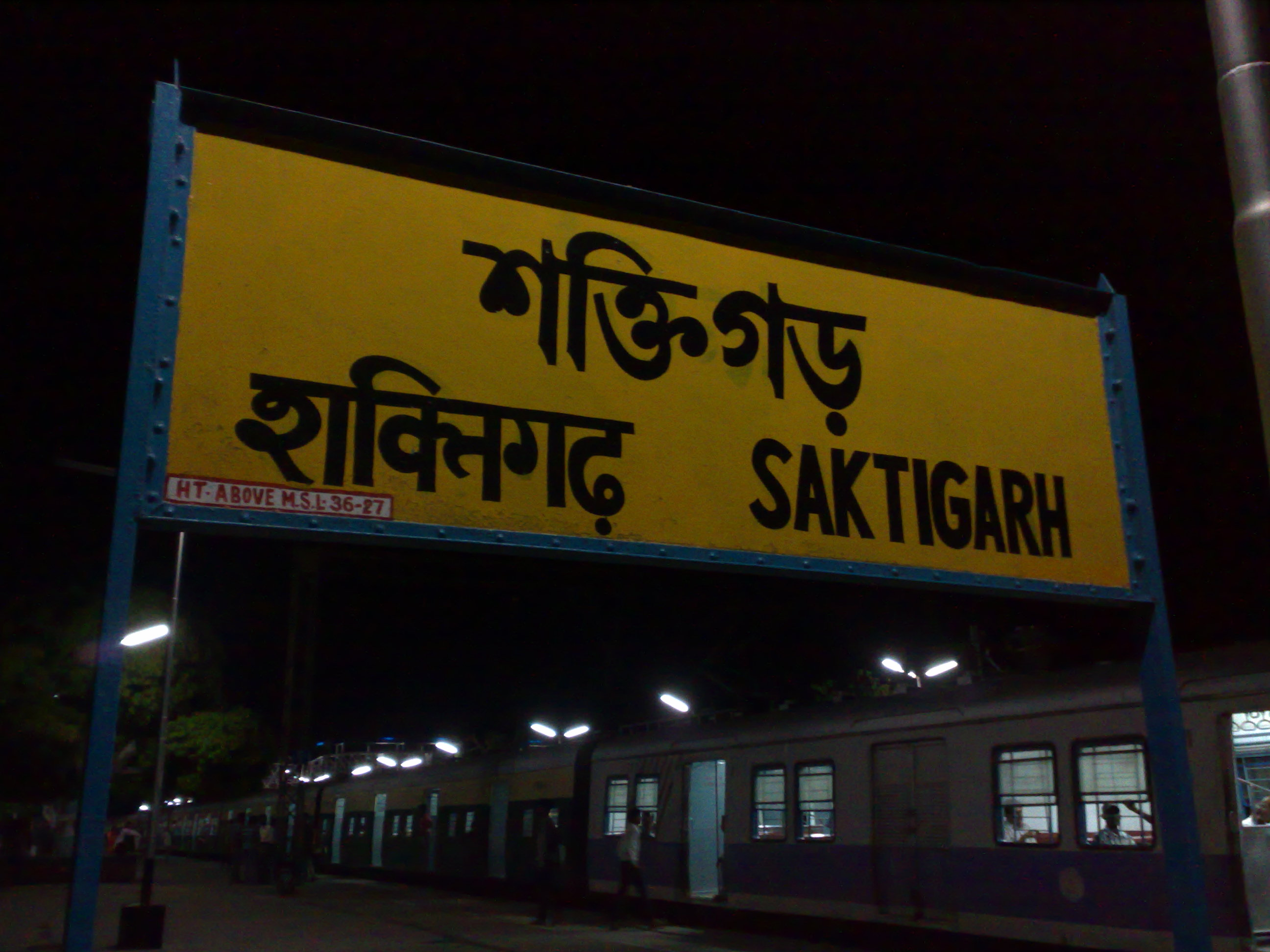

General information
- Location: Grand Trunk Road, Saktigarh, Distt. Purba Bardhaman, West Bengal
- Coordinates: 23°12′26″N 87°58′08″E
- Elevation: 36.27 metres (119.0 ft)
- System: Kolkata Suburban Railway junction station
- Owner: Indian Railways
- Operator: Eastern Railway
- Lines: Howrah–Bardhaman main line Howrah–Bardhaman chord
- Platforms: 7

Construction
- Structure type: Standard (on-ground station)
- Parking: No
- Cycle facilities: Yes

Other information
- Status: Functioning
- Station code: SKG
- Division(s): Howrah

History
- Opened: 1855
- Electrified: 1958
- Former names: East Indian Railway Company

Services
Preceding station	Kolkata Suburban Railway	Following station
Palsit towards Howrah Junction	Eastern Line Howrah–Bardhaman main line & Howrah–Bardhaman chord	Gangpur towards Barddhaman Junction
Palla Road towards Howrah Junction	Eastern Line Howrah–Bardhaman main line & Howrah–Bardhaman chord	Gangpur towards Barddhaman Junction
Route map
Location
- Location within West Bengal Location within India

Saktigarh is a Kolkata Suburban Railway junction station on the Howrah–Bardhaman main line and Howrah–Bardhaman chord. It is located in Purba Bardhaman district in the Indian state of West Bengal. It serves Saktigarh and surrounding areas.

== History ==
The first passenger train in eastern India ran from Howrah to Hooghly on 15 August 1854. The track was extended to Raniganj by 1855.

The Howrah–Bardhaman chord, a shorter link to Bardhaman from Howrah than the Howrah–Bardhaman main line, was constructed in 1917.

== Electrification ==
Electrification of Howrah–Burdwan main line was completed with 25 kV AC overhead system in 1958. Howrah–Bardhaman chord was electrified in 1964–66.
