= Halisahar railway station =

Railway station in West Bengal, India

Halisahar
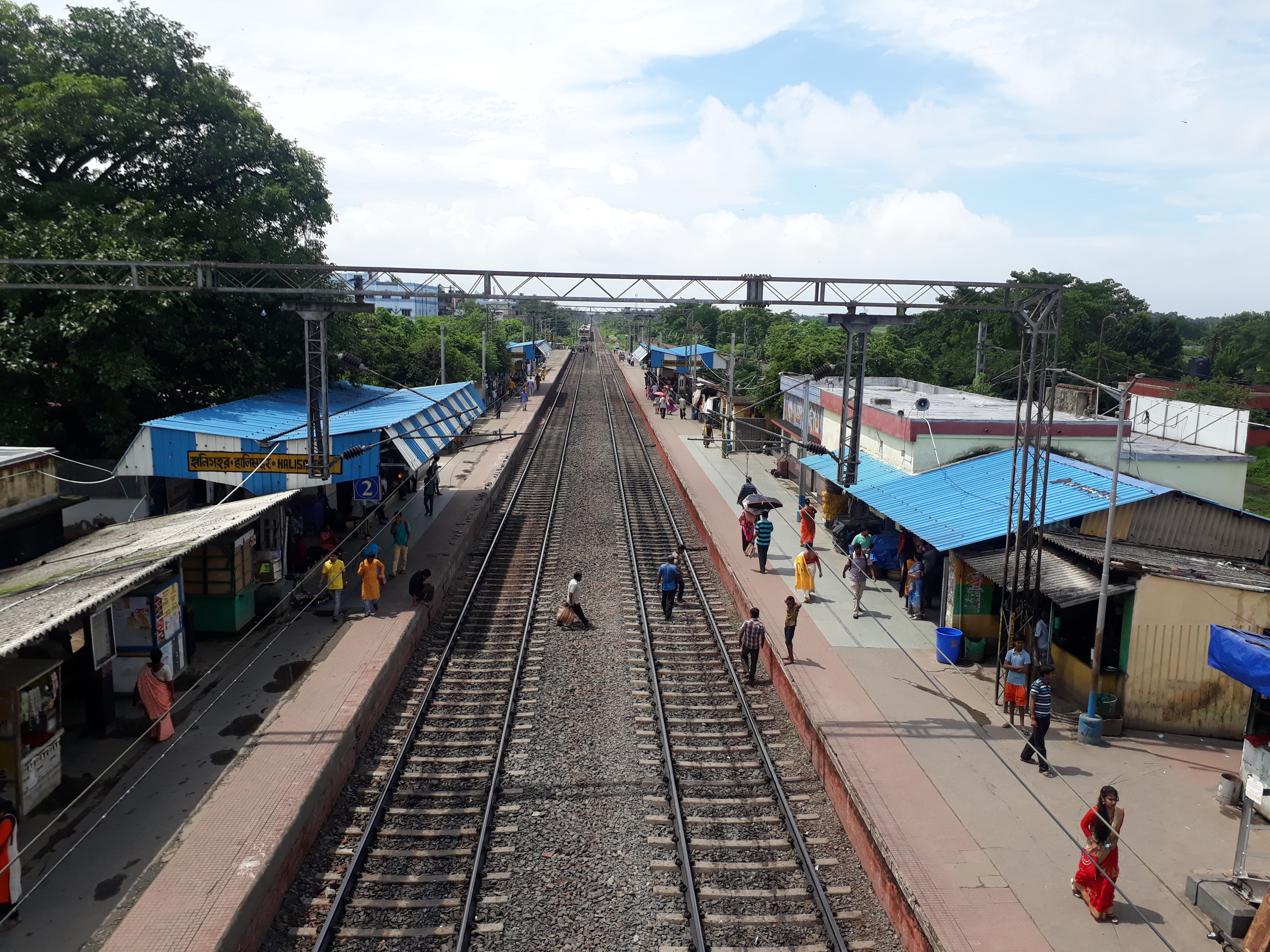
- Halisahar Railway Station

General information
- Location: Halisahar, North 24 Parganas district, West Bengal; India
- Coordinates: 22°55′15″N 88°26′13″E
- Elevation: 16 metres (52 ft)
- System: Kolkata Suburban Railway station
- Owner: Indian Railways
- Operator: Eastern Railway
- Line: Sealdah–Ranaghat line of Kolkata Suburban Railway
- Platforms: 3
- Tracks: 3

Construction
- Structure type: Standard on ground station
- Parking: Not available
- Cycle facilities: Yes (Private operators)

Other information
- Status: Functional
- Station code: HLR
- Zone(s): Eastern Railway
- Division(s): Sealdah

History
- Opened: 1862; 164 years ago
- Electrified: 1963–1965; 61 years ago

Services
| Preceding station | Kolkata Suburban Railway | Following station |
|---|---|---|
| Naihati towards Sealdah | Eastern Line Main line | Kanchrapara Workshop Gate towards Ranaghat Junction |
Route map
Location
- Location within West Bengal Location within India

Halisahar Railway Station is the railway station in the town of Halisahar. It serves the local areas of Halisahar in North 24 Parganas district, West Bengal, India.

== History ==
The Sealdah–Kushtia line of the Eastern Bengal Railway was opened to railway traffic in the year 1862. Eastern Bengal Railway used to work only on the eastern side of the Hooghly River.

== Station complex ==
The platform is well sheltered, it has many facilities including water, sanitation along with automated ticket vending machines (ATVMs). A brand new wide-body overbridge is being built near the ticket counter, the old bridge will be discarded soon. Halisahar station is well connected to the BT Road on west (also known as 85 bus route) and Kalyani Express way via Malancha Road on eastern side. Currently a new proper approach road is being built to this station on the eastern side. The platforms are getting upgraded with raising the height of platform and extending the length of Platform 2 and 3 to accommodate longer passenger trains. Work was temporarily halted due to COVID-19 but now it has resumed and a new platform no. 3 is being built for the Naihati–Ranaghat 3rd line.

== Expansions ==
- 1963–1965: Sealdah–Ranaghat sector was electrified.
- 2016–2018: Construction and commissioning of Halisahar-Bandel bypass line for goods train (via Garifa)
- 2018–2019: Construction of new Cabin Interlocking station (Not commissioned yet).
- 2020–2023: Construction and commissioning of Platform No.3 along with commissioning of new ballast 3rd track.
