= Palpara =

- Neighbourhood
- 17th century terracotta temple

- Location in West Bengal, India Palpara (India)
- Coordinates: 23°3′36.84″N 88°31′16.375″E
- Country: India
- State: West Bengal
- District: Nadia
- Elevation: 11 m (36 ft)

Languages
  - Official: Bengali, English
- Time zone: UTC+5:30 (IST)
- Lok Sabha constituency: Ranaghat
- Vidhan Sabha constituency: Chakdaha

Palpara is a neighbourhood in Chakdaha, in Kalyani subdivision of the Nadia district in the state of West Bengal, India. The Palpara railway station is 59 km from Sealdah railway station, and 51.4 km from Krishnanagar railway station. Palpara is famous for its 17th-century terracotta Kali temple, also popularly known as "Palpara Temple", which is now under the supervision of Archaeological Survey of India (ASI).

== Geography ==
Cities and towns in Kalyani subdivision of Nadia district
M: municipal town/city/notified area, CT: census town, R: rural/urban centre.
Owing to space constraints in the small map, the actual locations in a larger map may vary slightly.

=== Location ===
Palpara is located at approximately 23.060°N 88.521°E.

Note: The map alongside presents some of the notable locations in the subdivision. All places marked in the map are linked in the larger full screen map. All the four subdivisions are presented with maps on the same scale – the size of the maps vary as per the area of the subdivision.

== Education ==
There are two high schools in Palpara. One secondary school, named Palpara Vidyamandir, and one higher secondary school, named Bhawanipur Sukanta Vidyaniketan. There is a law college near Palpara, named J.R.S.E.T. College of Law.

== Culture ==
Durga Puja, Kali Puja and Saraswati Puja are widely celebrated. Multiple fairs are held in the nearby club grounds of "Chhatramilani" and "Bibadi Club". The only Buddhist temple of the district is located at Palpara, founded in 1964.

David J. McCutchion mentioned the Palpara Temple (26’ x 21’) as possibly a 17th-century structure. The ASI has built the roof to a point.

== Gallery ==
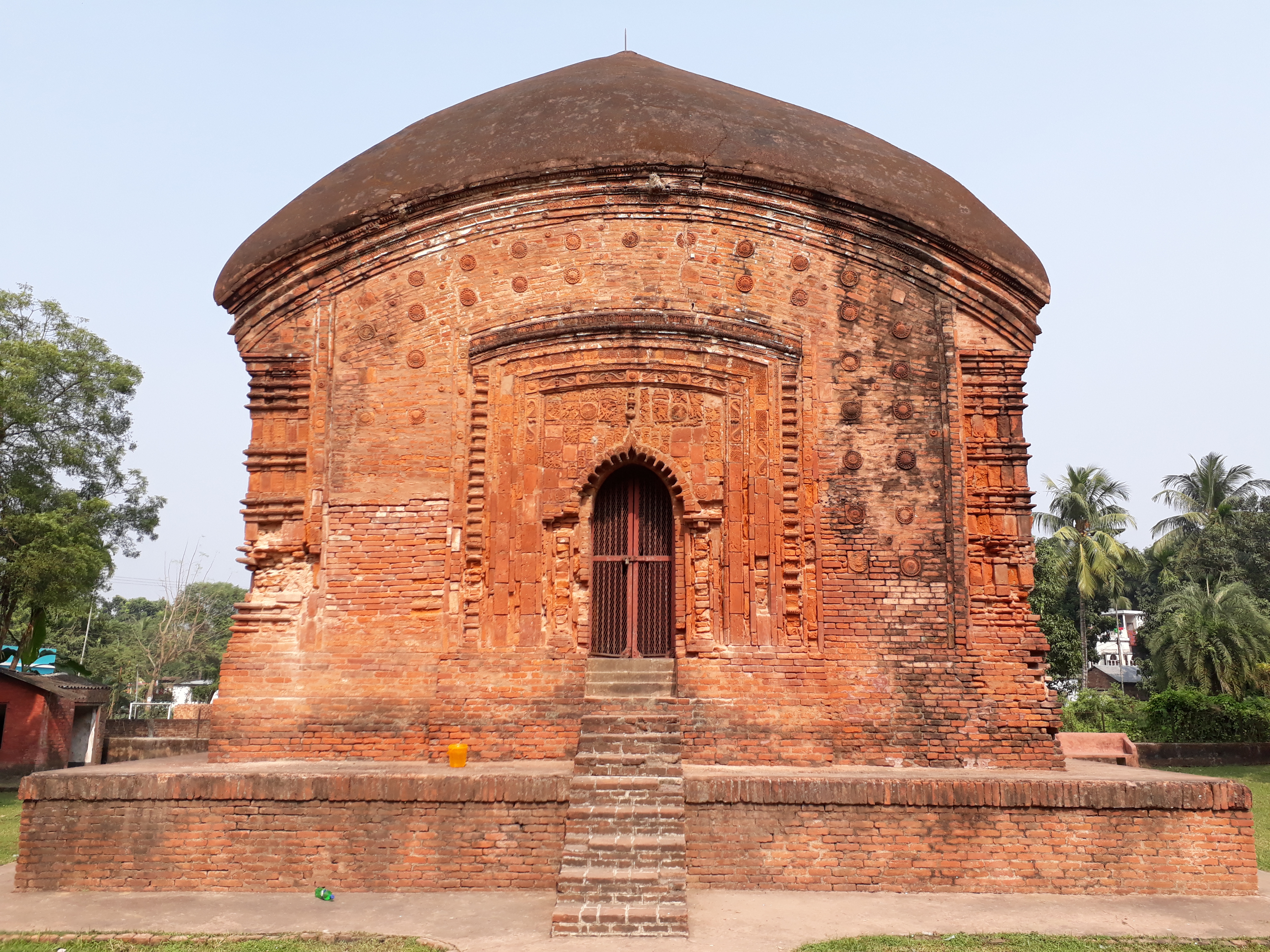
Picture taken in 2016

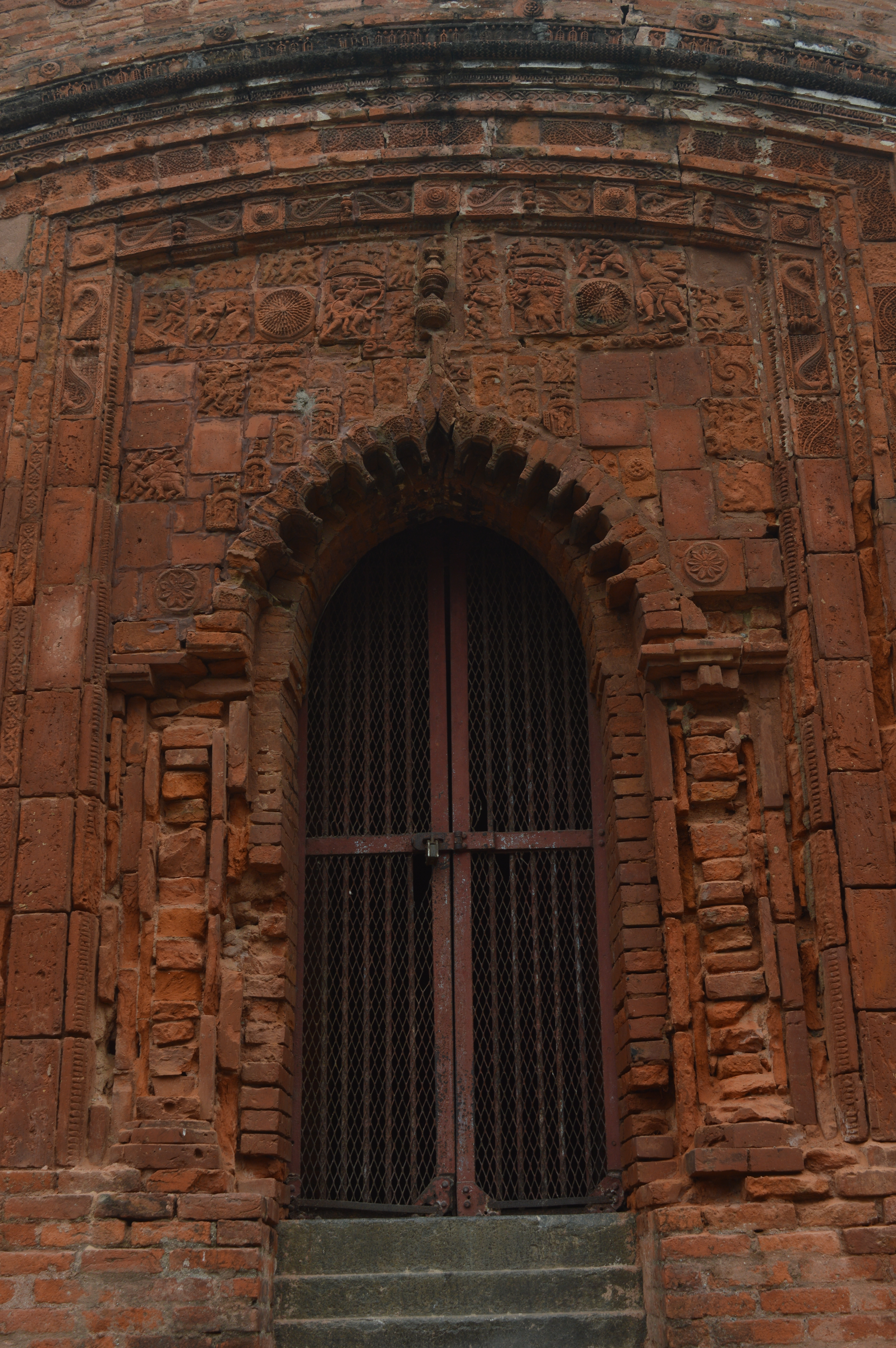
Front door decoration

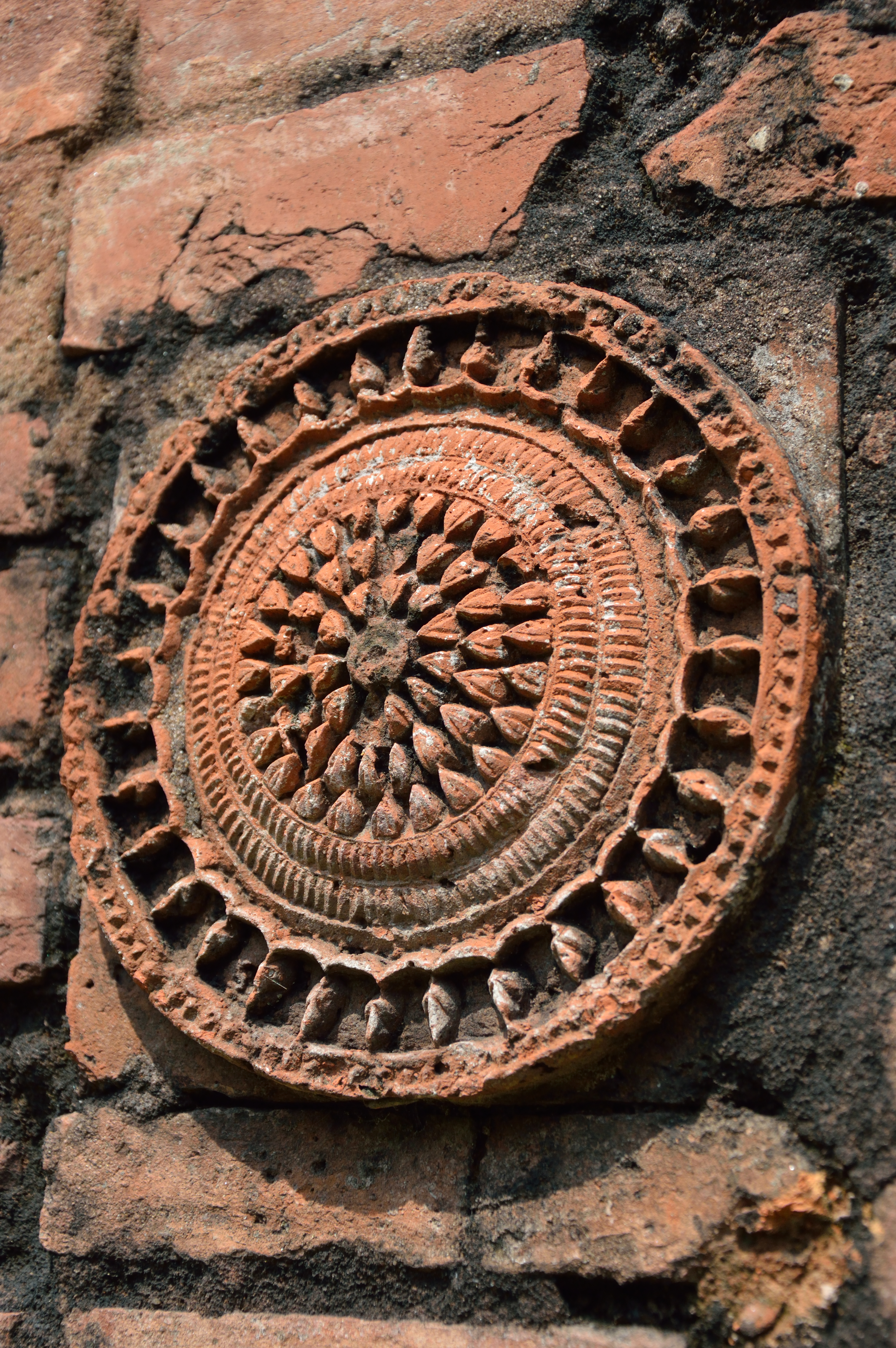
Terracotta lotus medallion

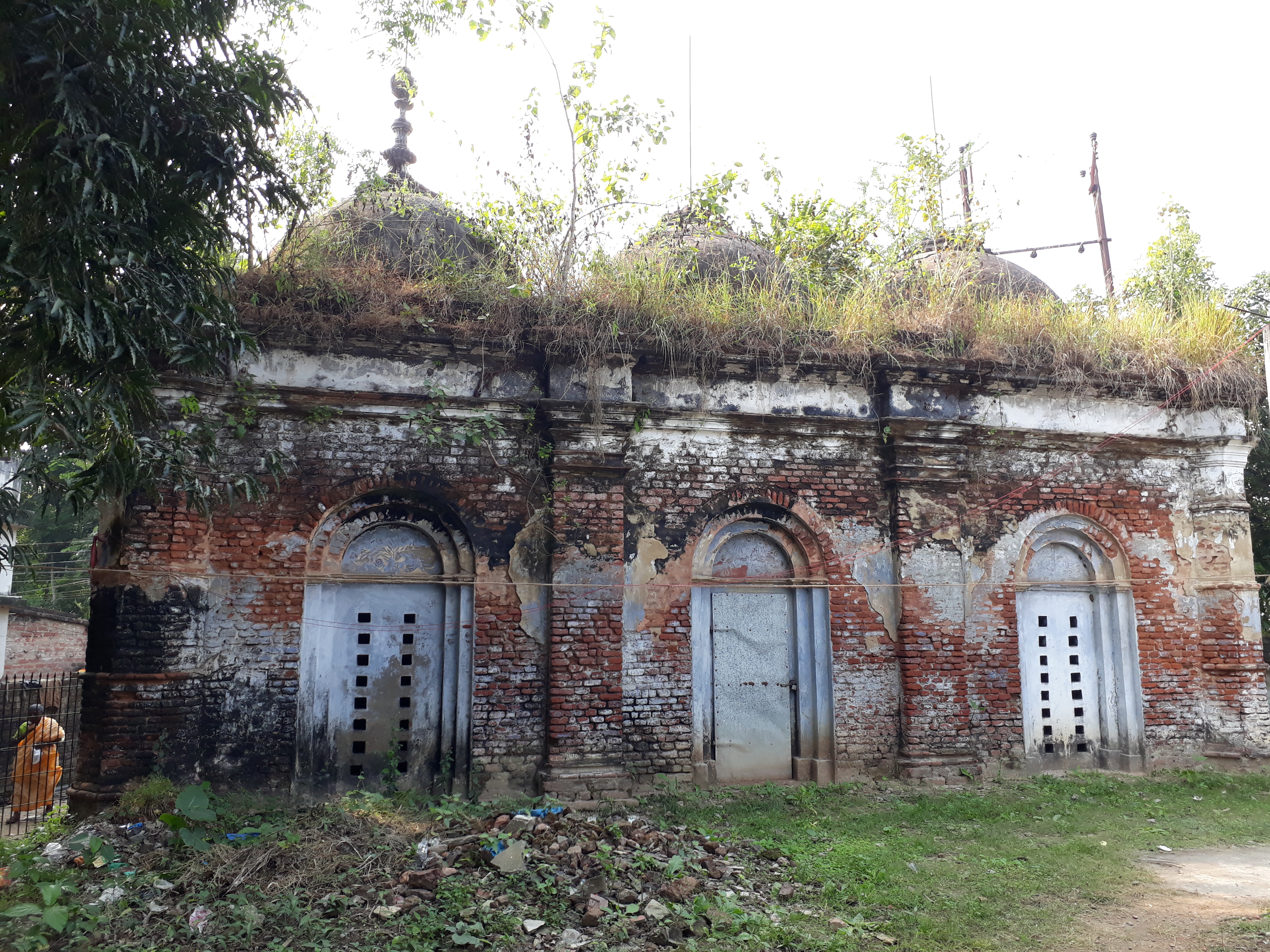
Historical Kazipara Mosque

Palpara Jora Shiva Temple

Palpara Buddhist Temple, the only buddhist temple in Nadia district
