= Phulia railway station =

Railway station in West Bengal, India

Phulia
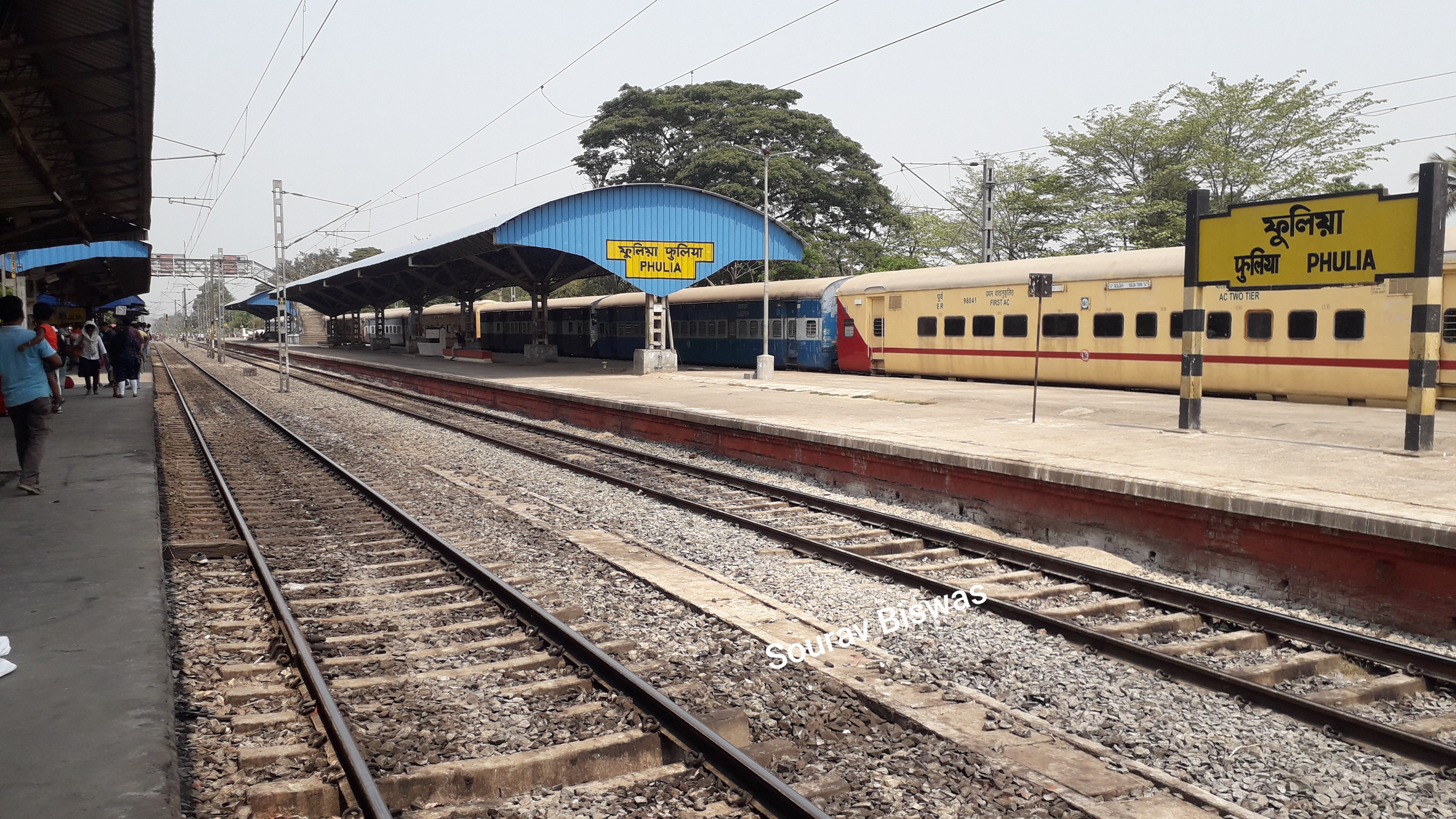

General information
- Location: National Highway 12, Phulia, Nadia, West Bengal; India
- Coordinates: 23.229516°N 88.496872°E
- Elevation: 15 m (49 ft)
- System: Kolkata Suburban Railway station
- Owner: Indian Railways
- Operator: Eastern Railway
- Line: Ranaghat–Shantipur line of Kolkata Suburban Railway
- Platforms: 3
- Tracks: 3

Construction
- Structure type: At grade
- Parking: Not available
- Cycle facilities: Not available
- Accessible: Not available

Other information
- Status: Functional
- Station code: FLU
- Zone(s): Eastern Railway
- Division(s): Sealdah

History
- Electrified: 1963–64

Services
Preceding station	Kolkata Suburban Railway	Following station
Habibpur towards Sealdah	Eastern Line Lalgola and Gede branch lines	Bathna Krittibas towards Shantipur
Route map
Location
- Location within West Bengal Location within India

Phulia railway station is a railway station of the Kolkata Suburban Railway system and operated by Eastern Railway. It is situated beside National Highway 12 (previously NH 34) at Chatkatala, Phulia on the Ranaghat–Shantipur line in Nadia district in the Indian state of West Bengal. The distance between Sealdah to Phulia railway station is approximately 89 km.

== History ==
The Kalinarayanpur–Shantipur section was converted to broad gauge to allow EMU coaches from Sealdah to run up to Shantipur. The line including Phulia railway station was doubled in 2014–15 and electrified in 1964–65.
