= Habibpur railway station =

Railway station in West Bengal, India

Habibpur
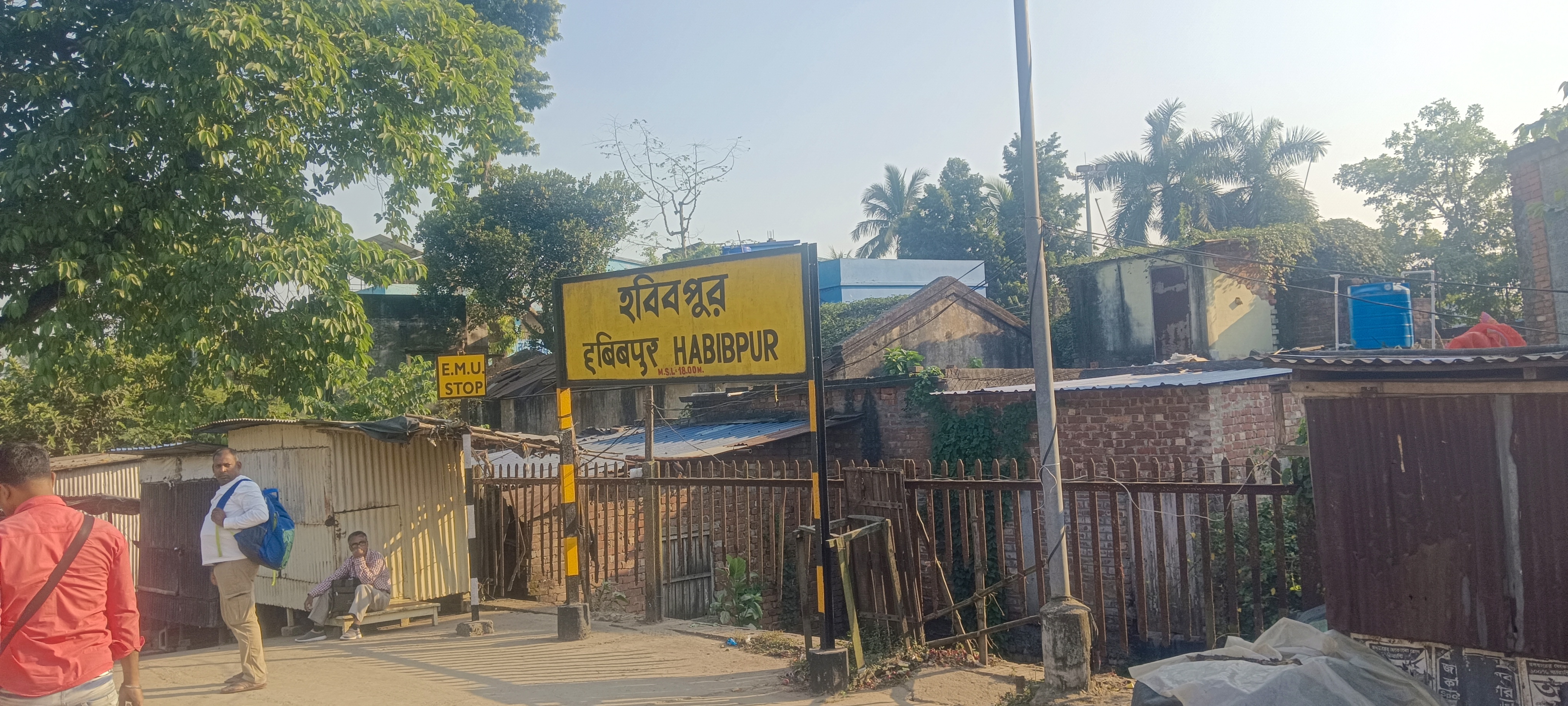

General information
- Location: Habibpur, Nadia, West Bengal; India
- Coordinates: 23.211374°N 88.538956°E
- Elevation: 18 m (59 ft)
- System: Kolkata Suburban Railway station
- Owner: Indian Railways
- Operator: Eastern Railway
- Line: Ranaghat–Shantipur line of Kolkata Suburban Railway
- Platforms: 2
- Tracks: 2

Construction
- Structure type: At grade
- Parking: Not available
- Cycle facilities: Not available
- Accessible: Not available

Other information
- Status: Functional
- Station code: HBE
- Zone(s): Eastern Railway
- Division(s): Sealdah

History
- Electrified: 1963–64

Services
Preceding station	Kolkata Suburban Railway	Following station
Kalinarayanpur Junction towards Sealdah	Eastern Line Lalgola and Gede branch lines	Phulia towards Shantipur
Route map
Location
- Location within West Bengal Location within India

Habibpur railway station is a railway station of the Kolkata Suburban Railway system and operated by Eastern Railway. It is situated at Mahishya para, Raghabpur, Habibpur on the Ranaghat–Shantipur line in Nadia district in the Indian state of West Bengal. This railway station serves Ranaghat I and Habibpur area.

== History ==
The Kalinarayanpur–Shantipur section was converted to broad gauge to allow EMU coaches from Sealdah to run up to Shantipur. The line including Habibpur railway station was doubled in 2014–15 and electrified in 1963–64.
