= Bathna Krittibas railway station =

Railway station in West Bengal, India

Bathna Krittibas

General information
- Location: Bathna Krittibas, Ghoralia, Shantipur, Nadia, West Bengal; India
- Coordinates: 23.246343°N 88.463222°E
- Elevation: 16 m (52 ft)
- System: Kolkata Suburban Railway
- Owner: Indian Railways
- Operator: Eastern Railway
- Line: Ranaghat–Shantipur line of Kolkata Suburban Railway
- Platforms: 2
- Tracks: 2

Construction
- Structure type: At grade
- Parking: Not available
- Cycle facilities: Not available
- Accessible: Not available

Other information
- Status: Functional
- Station code: BTKB
- Zone(s): Eastern Railway
- Division(s): Sealdah

History
- Electrified: 1963–64

Services
Preceding station	Kolkata Suburban Railway	Following station
Phulia towards Sealdah	Eastern Line Lalgola and Gede branch lines	Shantipur towards Krishnanagar City Junction
Route map
Location
- Location within West Bengal Location within India

Bathna Krittibas railway station is a halt railway station of the Kolkata Suburban Railway system and operated by Eastern Railway. It is situated at Bathna Krittibas, Ghoralia, Shantipur on the Ranaghat–Shantipur line in Nadia district in the Indian state of West Bengal.

== History ==
The Kalinarayanpur–Shantipur section was converted to broad gauge to allow EMU coaches from Sealdah to run up to Shantipur. The line including Bathna Krittibas railway station was doubled in 2014–15 and electrified in 1963–64.
