= Kaikala railway station =

Railway station in West Bengal, India

Kaikala
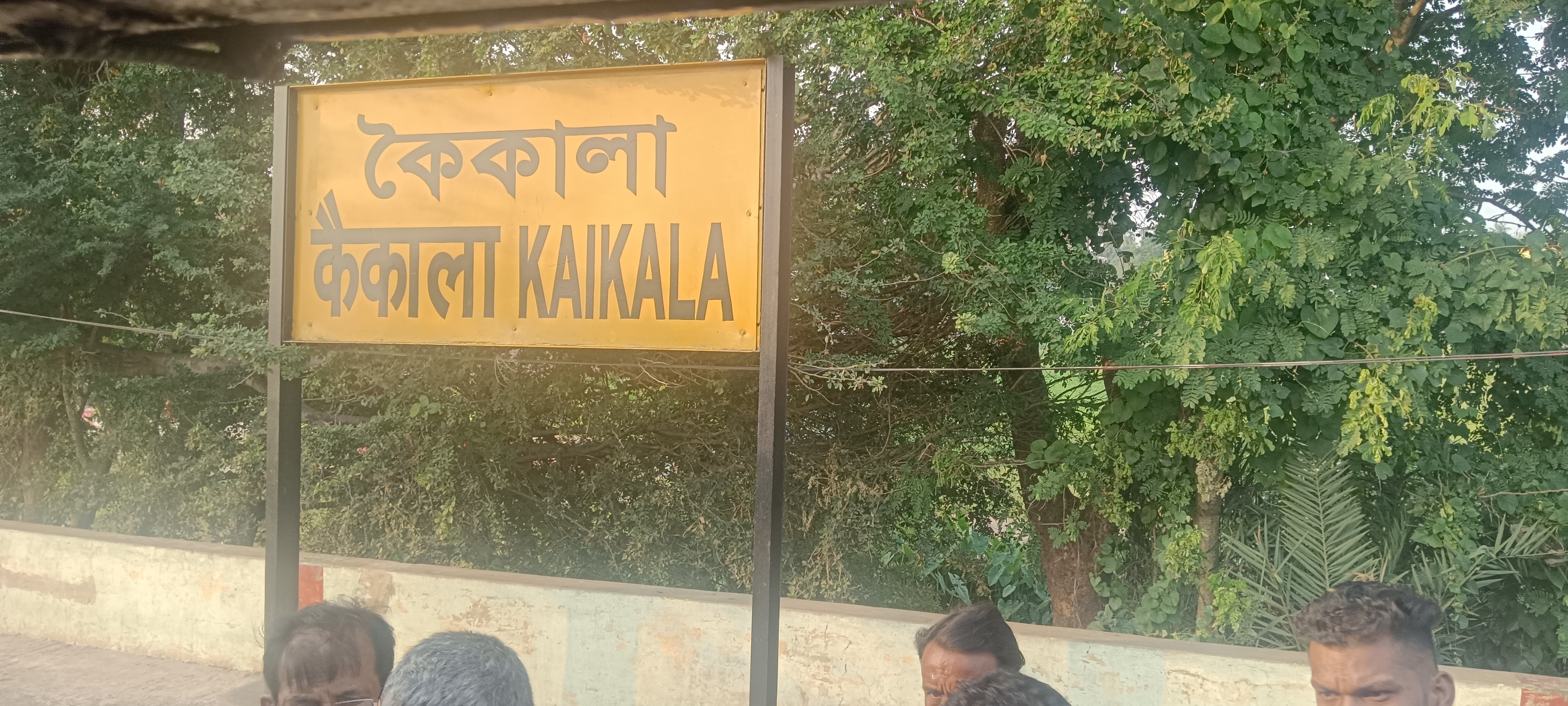
- Kaikala railway station

General information
- Location: Chautara Road, Khamar Chandi, Kaikala, Hooghly district, West Bengal; India
- Coordinates: 22°50′26″N 88°05′30″E
- Elevation: 14 metres (46 ft)
- System: Kolkata Suburban Railway station
- Owner: Indian Railways
- Operator: Eastern Railway
- Line: Sheoraphuli–Tarakeswar branch line
- Platforms: 2
- Tracks: 2

Construction
- Structure type: Standard (on-ground station)
- Cycle facilities: Yes

Other information
- Status: Functioning
- Station code: KKAE
- Division(s): Howrah

History
- Opened: 1885
- Electrified: 1957–58
- Former names: Tarkessur Railway Company

Services
Preceding station	Kolkata Suburban Railway	Following station
Haripal towards Howrah Junction	Eastern Line Sheoraphuli–Bishnupur branch line	Bahirkhanda towards Goghat
Route map
Location
- Location within West Bengal Location within India

Kaikala railway station is a Kolkata Suburban Railway station on the Sheoraphuli–Tarakeswar branch line of Howrah railway division of the Eastern Railway zone. It is situated beside Chautara Road, Khamar Chandi at Kaikala in Hooghly district in the Indian state of West Bengal.

== History ==
The Sheoraphuli–Tarakeswar branch line was opened by the Tarkessur Railway Company on 1 January 1885 and was worked by East Indian Railway Company. The Tarkessur company was taken over by the East Indian Railway in 1915. The track was first electrified with 3,000 V DC system in 1957–58. In 1967, this line including Kaikala railway station was electrified with to 25 kV AC system.
