= Kaikala (village) =

- Village
- Location in West Bengal, India Kaikala (India)
- Coordinates: 22.86725°N 88.09955°E
- Country: India
- State: West Bengal
- District: Hooghly
- Elevation: 18 m (59 ft)

Population (2011)
  - Total: 28,178

Languages
  - Official: Bengali, English
- Time zone: UTC+5:30 (IST)
- PIN: 712405
- Telephone code: 91 3212
- ISO 3166 code: IN-WB
- Sex ratio: 933 ♂/♀
- Lok Sabha constituency: Arambagh
- Vidhan Sabha constituency: Tarakeswar

Kaikala is a village in Hooghly District in the Indian state of West Bengal.

== Geography ==
Kaikala is located at 22.86°N 88.09°E. It has an average elevation of 18 metres (59 ft).

== Demographics ==
As of 2011 India census, Kaikala had a population of 28,178. Males constitute 56% of the population and females 44%. Kaikala has an average literacy rate of 72%, higher than the national average of 59.5%: male literacy is 78%, and female literacy is 66%. In Kaikala, 10% of the population is under 6 years of age.

== Economics ==
This is a rich agricultural area with several cold storages.

== Transport ==
The Howrah-Tarakeswar line was opened in 1885. Kaikala railway station is 10 km (6.2 mi) from Tarakeswar railway station.
