= Bahirkhanda railway station =

Railway station in West Bengal, India

Bahirkhanda
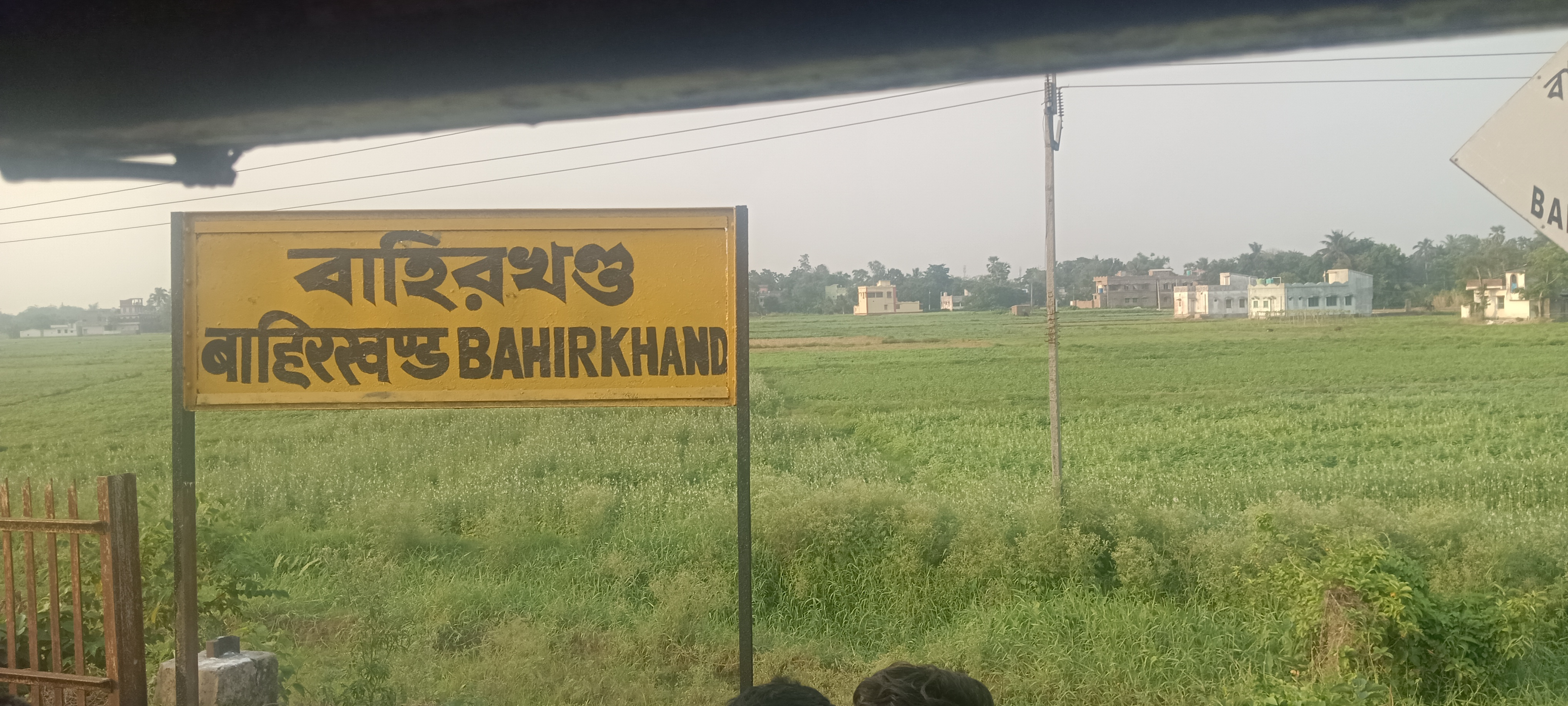
- Bahirkhanda railway station

General information
- Location: Tarakeswar Road, Bahirkhanda, Hooghly district, West Bengal; India
- Coordinates: 22°51′10″N 88°04′09″E
- Elevation: 15 metres (49 ft)
- System: Kolkata Suburban Railway
- Owner: Indian Railways
- Operator: Eastern Railway
- Line: Sheoraphuli–Tarakeswar branch line
- Platforms: 2
- Tracks: 2

Construction
- Structure type: Standard (on-ground station)
- Cycle facilities: Yes

Other information
- Status: Functioning
- Station code: BAHW
- Division(s): Howrah

History
- Opened: 1885
- Electrified: 1957–58
- Former names: Tarkessur Railway Company

Services
Preceding station	Kolkata Suburban Railway	Following station
Kaikala towards Howrah Junction	Eastern Line Sheoraphuli–Bishnupur branch line	Loknath towards Goghat
Route map
Location
- Location within West Bengal Location within India

Bahirkhanda railway station is a Kolkata Suburban Railway station on the Sheoraphuli–Tarakeswar branch line of Howrah railway division of the Eastern Railway zone. It is situated beside Tarakeswar Road at Bahirkhanda in Hooghly district in the Indian state of West Bengal.

== History ==
The Sheoraphuli–Tarakeswar branch line was opened by the Tarkessur Railway Company on 1 January 1885 and was worked by East Indian Railway Company. The Tarkessur company was taken over by the East Indian Railway in 1915. The track was first electrified with 3,000 V DC system in 1957–58. In 1967, this line including Bahirkhanda railway station was electrified with to 25 kV AC system.
