= Telua =

- village
- Country: India
- State: West Bengal

Languages
  - Official: Bengali, English
- Time zone: UTC+5:30 (IST)

Telua (earlier known as Telo Bhelo) is a village in Hooghly district under Arambag Block of West Bengal state in India. The village is situated at a distance of 1.5 miles from Mayapur village (a large village and railway station situated between Tarakeswar railway station and Arambag railway station) of the same block.

== History ==
It is famous for Dakat Kali (the Kali of the Dacoits) temple which was built by Dacoit leader named Bhim (according to some persons the Dacoit leader was named as Sagar Santra). The Dacoit leader had met Sarada Devi while she was on her way to Dakhineshwar to meet her husband Ramakrishna. The Dacoit leader was addressed as ‘father’ by Sarada Devi. The humility, soft-spokeness and a divine vision in the human form of Sarada Devi had changed the heart of the leader and he left the path of robbery. Later he constructed a temple in the honour of Kali, his favourite deity. To him Sarada Devi had seemed to be an incarnation of Kali.
