= Tarakeswar railway station =

Railway station in West Bengal, India

Tarakeswar
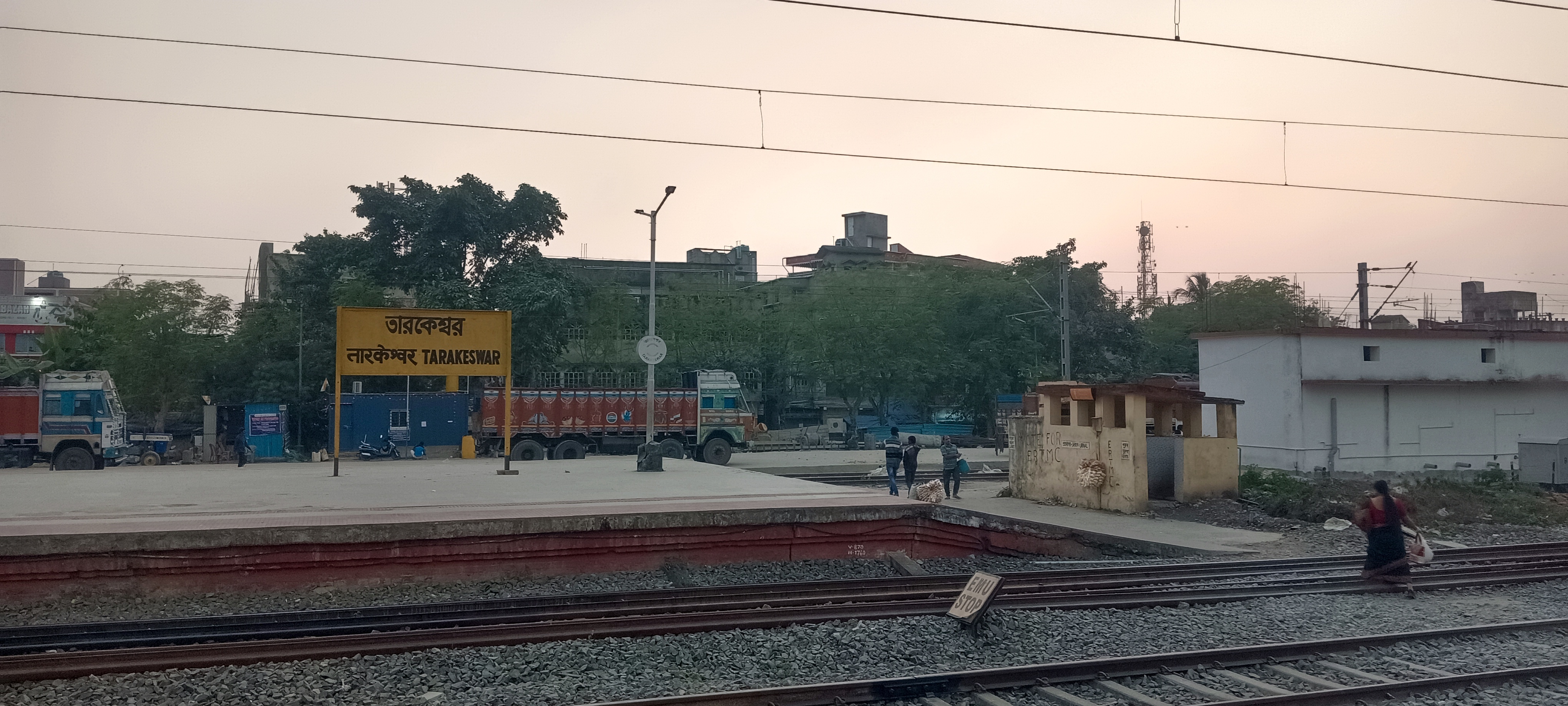
- Tarakeswar Railway Station

General information
- Location: State Highway 2, Tarakeswar, Hooghly District, West Bengal; India
- Coordinates: 22°52′57″N 88°00′51″E
- Elevation: 13 metres (43 ft)
- System: Kolkata Suburban Railway Station
- Owner: Indian Railways
- Operator: Eastern Railway
- Lines: Howrah–Bardhaman main line Sheoraphuli–Tarakeswar branch line
- Platforms: 4
- Tracks: 6

Construction
- Structure type: Standard (on ground station)
- Parking: no
- Cycle facilities: no

Other information
- Status: Functioning
- Station code: TAK
- Division(s): Howrah

History
- Opened: 1885
- Electrified: 1957–58
- Former names: Tarkessur Railway Company

Passengers
- Busy

Services
Preceding station	Kolkata Suburban Railway	Following station
Loknath towards Howrah Junction	Eastern Line Sheoraphuli–Bishnupur branch line	Talpur Halt towards Goghat
Route map
Location
- Location within West Bengal Location within India

Tarakeswar is a Kolkata Suburban Railway station on the Sheoraphuli–Tarakeswar branch line and is located in Hooghly district in the Indian state of West Bengal. It is a very important railway station of Hooghly district. It also one of the most busy railway station with high revenue of Eastern Railway. It serves Tarakeswar city and a large area of Hooghly district and also some parts of Howrah & Purba Barddhaman district. Due to very good bus connectivity from Tarakeswar to South Bengal; peoples of Bankura, East & West Midnapore also used this station.

== History ==
The broad gauge Sheoraphuli–Tarakeswar branch line was opened by the Tarkessur Railway Company on 1 January 1885 and was worked by East Indian Railway Company.

== Electrification ==
Howrah–Sheoraphuli–Tarakeswar line was electrified in 1957–58.

== Amenities ==
Tarakeswar railway station has a six-bedded dormitory.
