= Kalinarayanpur Junction railway station =

Railway station in West Bengal, India

Kalinarayanpur Junction
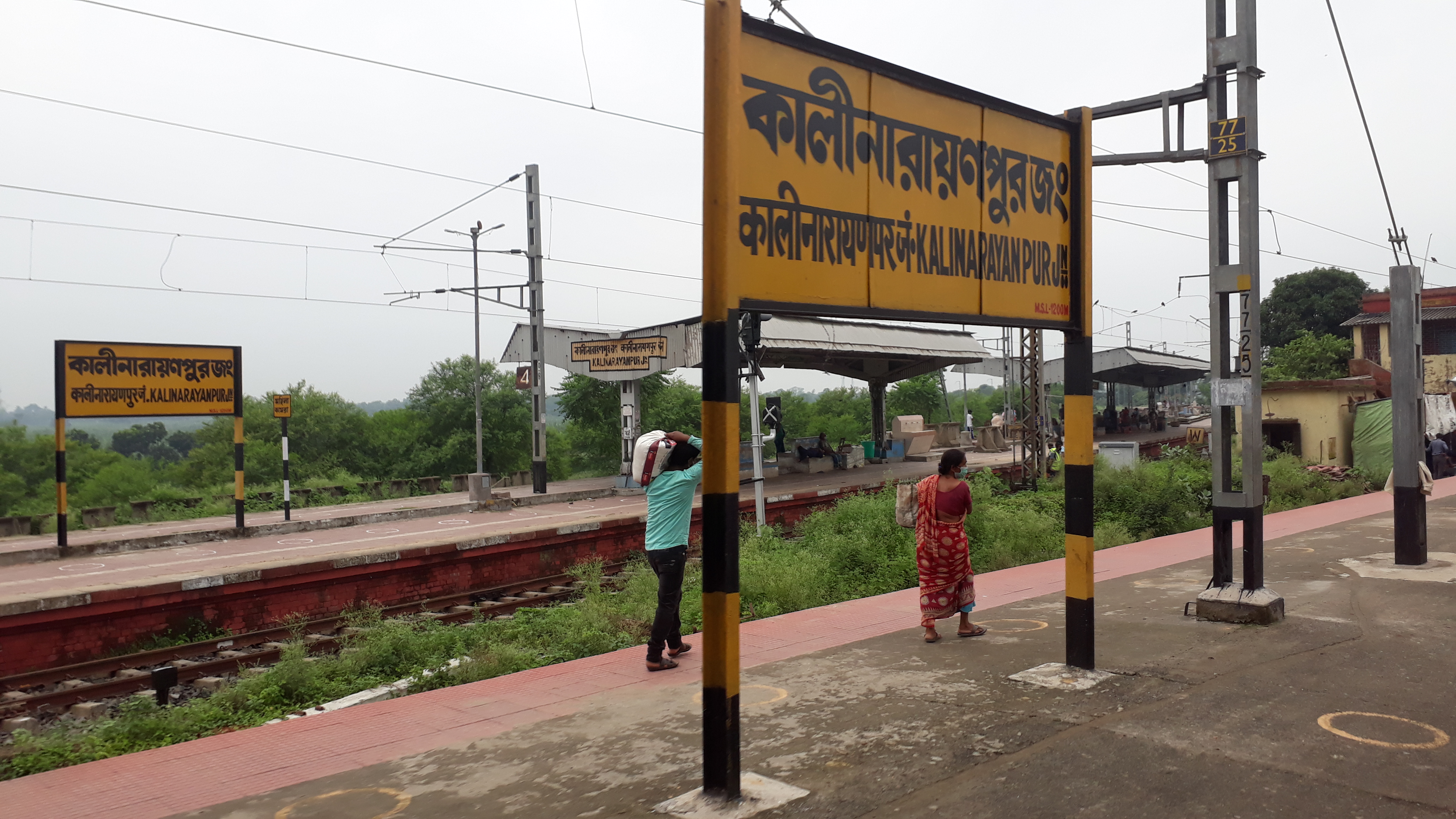

General information
- Location: Kalinarayanpur, Nadia, West Bengal; India
- Coordinates: 23°12′27″N 88°34′25″E
- System: Kolkata Suburban Railway station
- Owner: Indian Railways
- Operator: Eastern Railway
- Line: Sealdah–Krishnanagar line of Kolkata Suburban Railway
- Platforms: 4
- Tracks: 4

Construction
- Structure type: At grade
- Parking: Not available
- Cycle facilities: Not available
- Accessible: Not available

Other information
- Status: Functional
- Station code: KLNP
- Zone(s): Eastern Railway
- Division(s): Sealdah

History
- Opened: 1905; 121 years ago
- Electrified: 1965; 61 years ago

Services
Preceding station	Kolkata Suburban Railway	Following station
Ranaghat Junction towards Sealdah	Eastern Line Lalgola and Gede branch lines	Habibpur towards Shantipur
Ranaghat Junction towards Sealdah	Eastern Line Lalgola and Gede branch lines	Birnagar towards Krishnanagar City Junction
Route map
Location
- Location within West Bengal Location within India

Kalinarayanpur Junction railway station is part of the Kolkata Suburban Railway system and operated by Eastern Railway. It is located on the Ranaghat–Krishnanagar line in Nadia in the Indian state of West Bengal.
