= Shantipur Junction railway station =

Railway station in West Bengal, India

Shantipur Junction
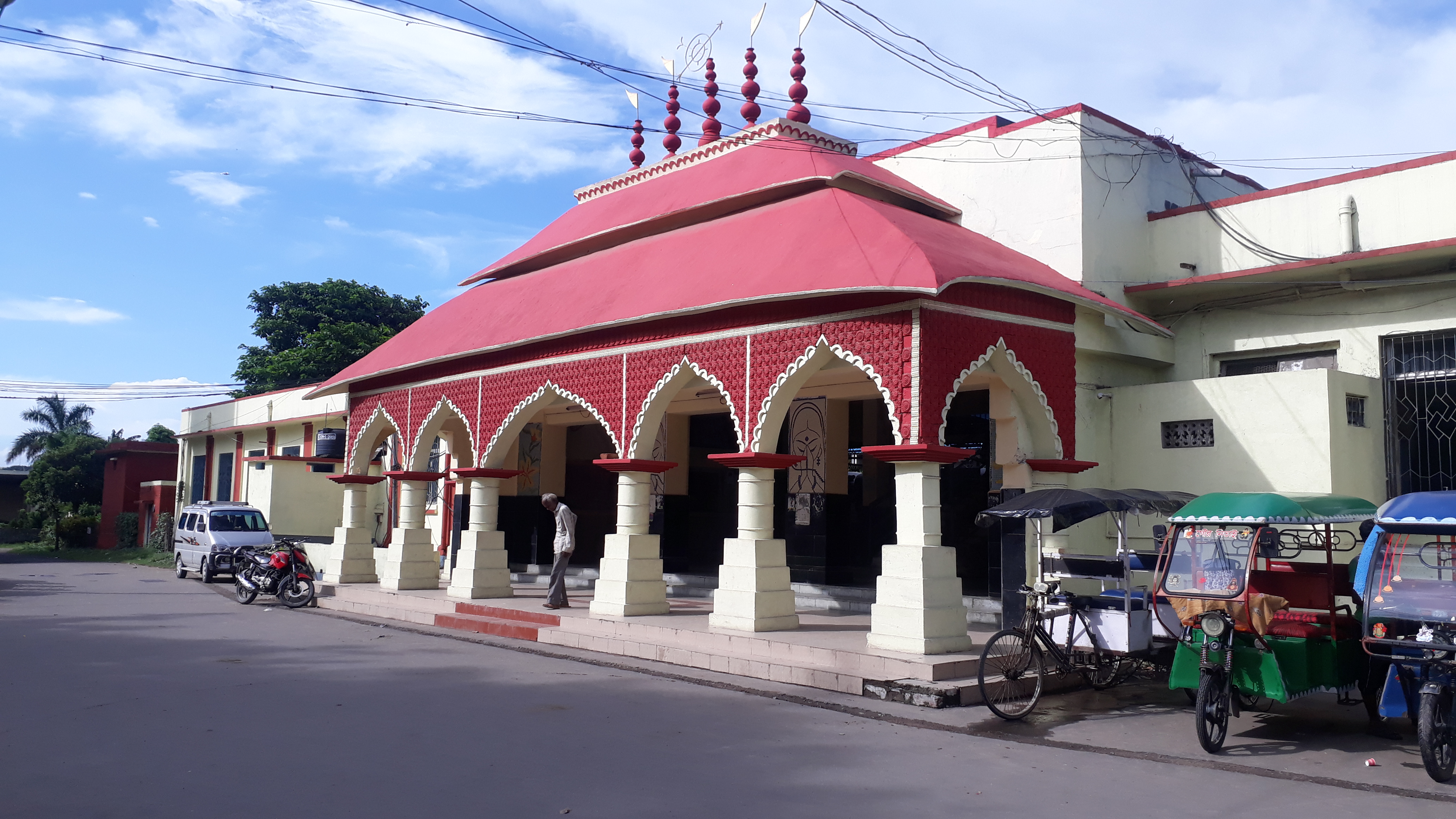

General information
- Location: National Highway-34, Shantipur, Nadia, West Bengal; India
- Coordinates: 23.263496°N 88.435688°E
- Elevation: 12 m (39 ft)
- System: Kolkata Suburban Railway station
- Owner: Indian Railways
- Operator: Eastern Railway
- Line: Ranaghat–Shantipur line of Kolkata Suburban Railway
- Platforms: 3
- Tracks: 3

Construction
- Structure type: At grade
- Parking: Not available
- Cycle facilities: Not available
- Accessible: Not available

Other information
- Status: Functional
- Station code: STB
- Zone(s): Eastern Railway
- Division(s): Sealdah

History
- Electrified: 1963–64

Services
Preceding station	Kolkata Suburban Railway	Following station
Bathna Krittibas towards Sealdah	Eastern Line Lalgola and Gede branch lines	Dignagar towards Amghata Halt
Route map
Location
- Location within West Bengal Location within India

Shantipur Junction railway station is a Junction railway station of the Kolkata Suburban Railway system and operated by Eastern Railway. It is situated in Shantipur, Nadia at the end of Kalinarayanpur to Shantipur loop line connecting with the Ranaghat–Krishnanagar line. Another broad-gauge route is connected to Krishnanagar City Junction from Shantipur, which was narrow-gauge track known as Shantipur-Nabadwip Ghat Light Railway branch, opened in 1948.
