= Kolkata Suburban Railway =

Regional rail system in Kolkata, India

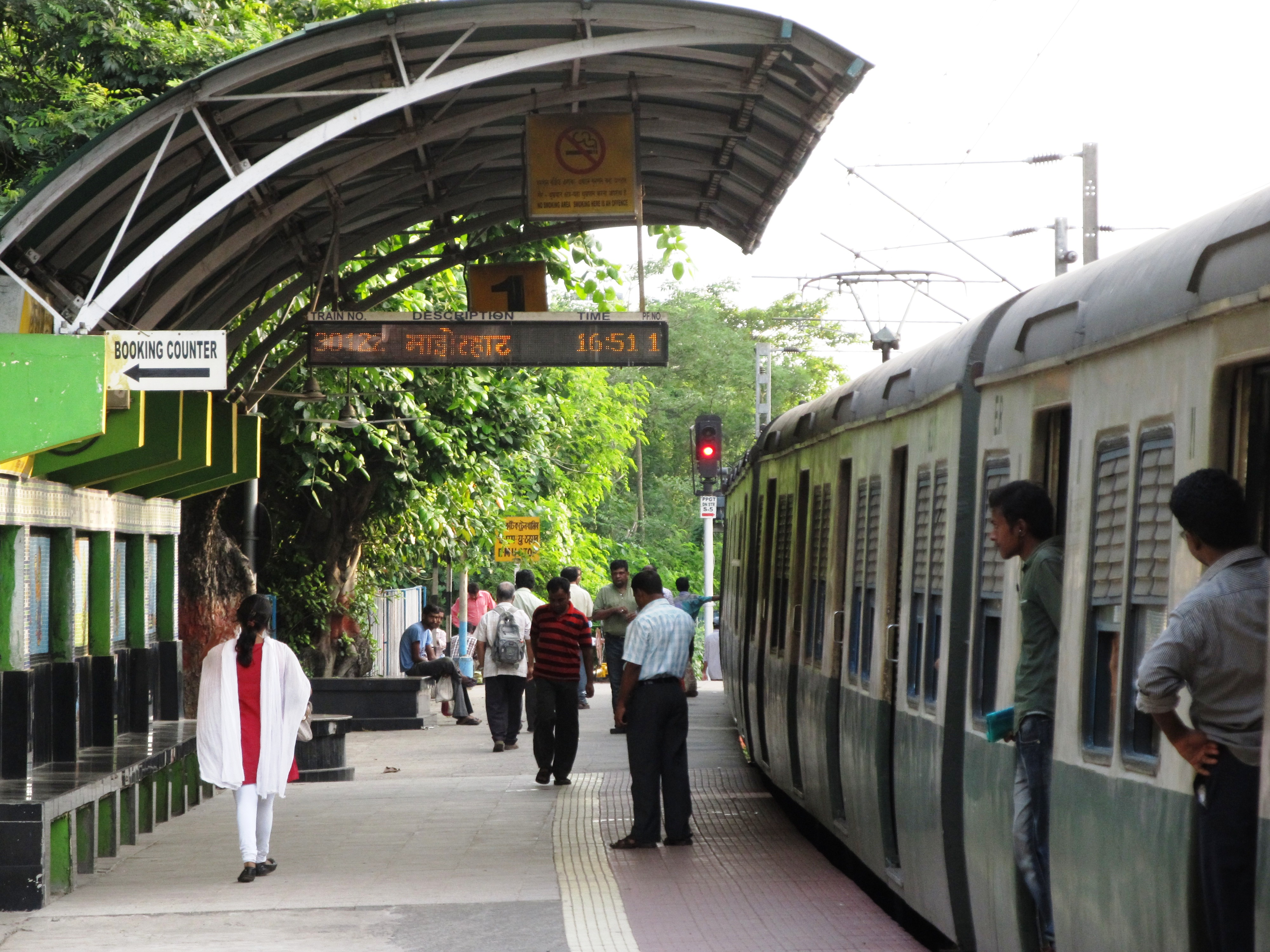
- Local train at B.B.D. Bag railway station heading towards Majerhat

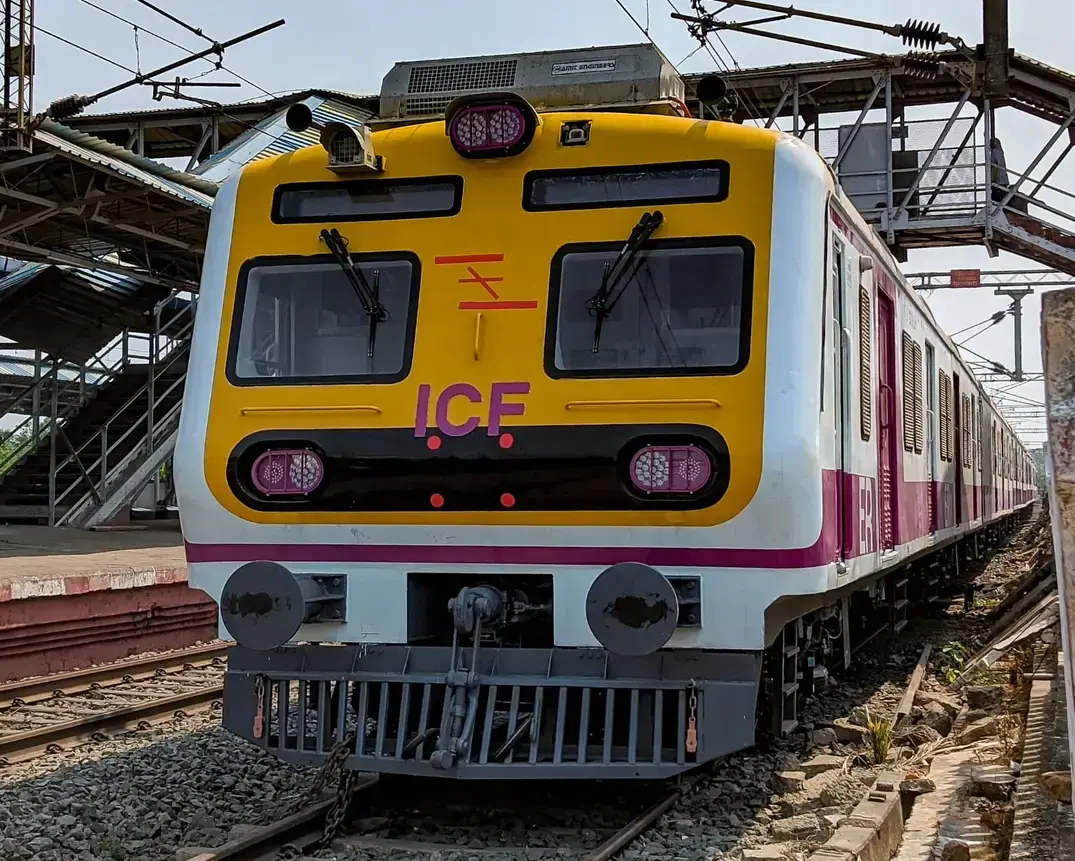
- An Alstom propulsion fitted ER 3-phase EMU

Overview
- Native name: কলকাতা শহরতলি রেল
- Owner: Indian Railways
- Area served: Kolkata Metropolitan Area; North 24 Parganas, South 24 Parganas, Howrah district, Hooghly district, Nadia district, Murshidabad, Purba Medinipur, Paschim Medinipur, Purba Bardhaman
- Locale: Kolkata Metropolitan Region, West Bengal, India
- Transit type: Suburban and Regional rail
- Number of lines: Eastern lines: 14; South Eastern lines: 4; Circular line: 1; South lines: 4; Chord link line: 1; Total = 24
- Number of stations: Eastern line: 266; South Eastern line: 87; Circular line: 20; South lines: 70; Chord link line: 15; Total: 458
- Daily ridership: 3.5 million (2017–18)
- Annual ridership: 1.2 billion
- Chief executive: Suneet Sharma GM (ER); Sanjay Mohanty GM (SER)
- Headquarters: Howrah (For SER and ER); Sealdah (For ER)
- Website: Indian Railways; Eastern Railway; South Eastern Railway

Operation
- Began operation: 1854; 172 years ago
- Operators: Eastern Railways; 1. Eastern line 2. Chord link line 3. Circular railway line 4. Sealdah South lines; South Eastern Railways; 1. South Eastern line
- Rolling stock: ICF, Jessop, BHEL, MEDHA, BEML, Alstom
- Number of vehicles: 200+
- Train length: 9 or 12 coaches

Technical
- System length: 1,501 km (933 mi)
- Track gauge: 1,676 mm (5 ft 6 in) Broad-gauge
- Electrification: 25 kV 50 Hz AC overhead catenary
- Average speed: 45 km/h (28 mph)
- Top speed: 100 km/h (62 mph)
Route map
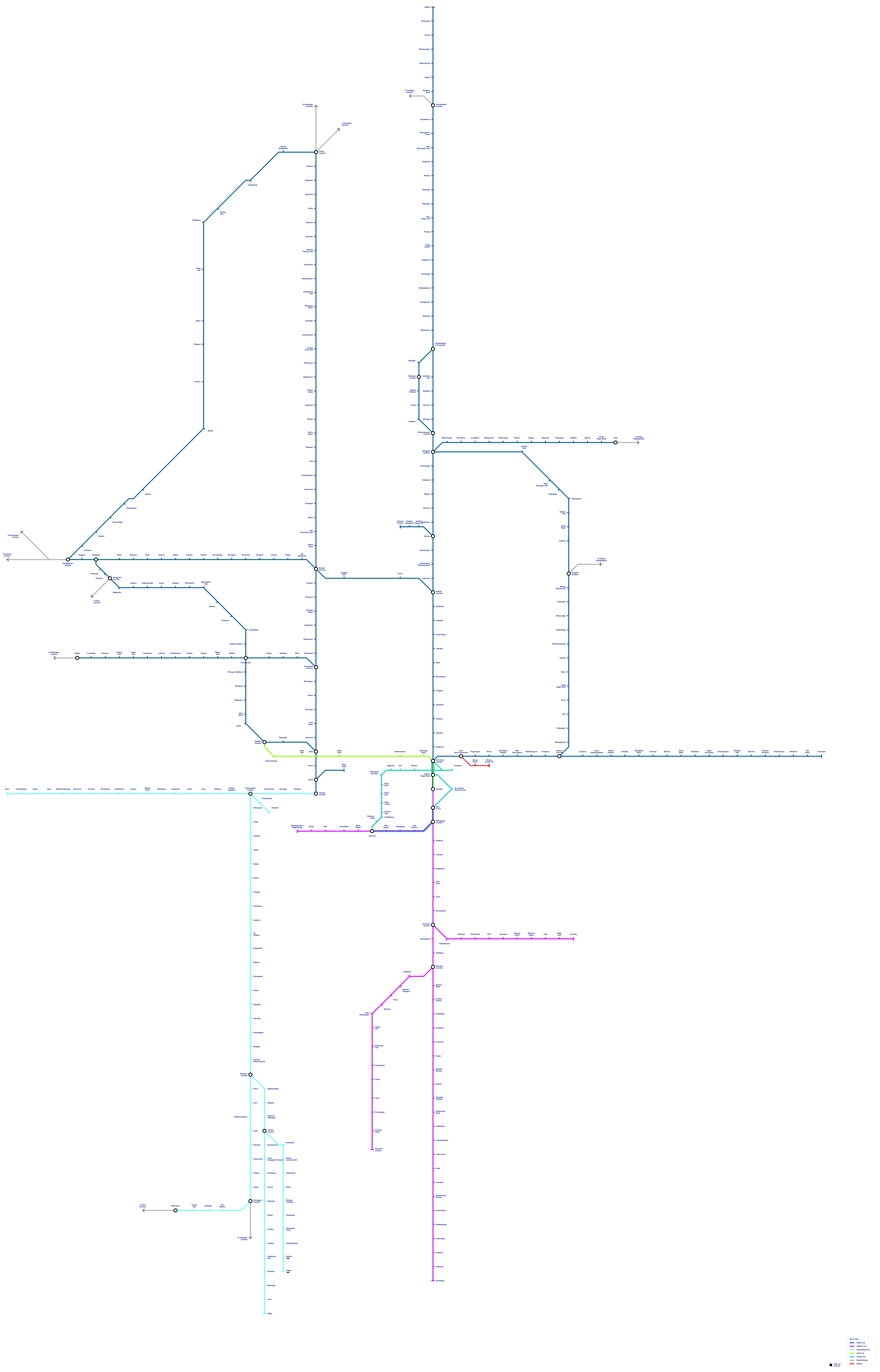

The Kolkata Suburban Railway (colloquially called Kolkata local trains or simply locals) is a suburban and regional rail system serving the Kolkata metropolitan area and its surroundings in West Bengal, India. Its network has 458 stations and a track length of 1,501 km (933 mi) making it the largest suburban railway network in the country, and also one of the largest in the world. There are five main lines and 19 branch lines. It operates more than 1,500 services, carrying 3.5 million people daily and 1.2 billion people annually. It runs from IST 03:00 am until 02:00 am approximately and fares range from Rs.5 to Rs.120. The system is electrified with 25 kV 50 Hz AC overhead line and runs on 5 ft 6 in (1,676 mm) broad gauge track. It has interchange stations with the Kolkata Metro at various locations.

The Kolkata Suburban Railway is part of the second passenger railway constructed in British India during the mid 19th century. The first train ran between Howrah and Hooghly stations. A hundred years after the initial run, EMU services began.

The system is operated by two Indian Railways zones; Eastern and South Eastern. These zones are further divided into Howrah and Sealdah railway divisions in Eastern Railways and Kharagpur in South Eastern Railway. Howrah, Sealdah, Shalimar, Santragachi Junction and Kolkata railway station are the five major terminals serving the network in the city for mail/express trains as well as passenger/fast passenger trains.

== History ==
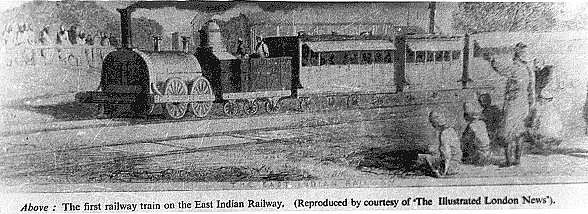
The first train of the East Indian Railway, 1854

The Kolkata Suburban Railway is an offshoot of the second passenger railway to be built by the British in India. The first train ran between Howrah and Hooghly stations on 15 August 1854 and was operated by the East Indian Railway (EIR). Regular services on the 38.6 km (24.0 mi) line were introduced on the same day, with stops at Bally, Serampore and Chandannagore stations. The broad gauge Sheoraphuli–Tarakeswar branch line was opened by the Tarkessur Railway Company on 1 January 1885.

In 1951, all the railway companies, zone and divisions were integrated and recategorized. This led to the formation of the Eastern Railway (ER) and South Eastern Railway (SER) zones. These zones of Indian Railways currently operate the Kolkata Suburban Railway.

=== Eastern Railway zone ===
The Eastern Railway zone was formed on 14 April, 1952, by the amalgamation of the East Indian Railway Company and the entire Bengal – Nagpur Railway (later it formed the SER). It has four divisions; Howrah and Sealdah divisions operate the system. The Sealdah division was part of the Eastern Bengal Railway before the recategorisation. Howrah division is the oldest in the ER zone.

On 1 February, 1957, the EMU services were introduced on the Howrah – Seoraphuli section of the Howrah division. Howrah–Sheoraphuli–Tarakeswar line was electrified in 1957–58. In 1963, services were gradually extended to Bandel and then Barddhaman and in 1964 on the Sealdah Division of Eastern Railway were introduced on the Sealdah – Ranaghat route. In 1968, the Howrah – Barddhaman main and chord line was totally converted to 25 kV 50 Hz AC power supply from a 3000 V DC power supply, whereas the Sealdah – Ranaghat line was electrified as 25 kV 50 Hz AC from the beginning.

=== South Eastern Railway zone ===
The Bengal Nagpur Railway (BNR) Company was incorporated in 1887 to take over from the Nagpur Chhattisgarh Railway (NCR) and to convert the line to broad gauge. The work was completed in 1888. The extension of the main line from Nagpur to Asansol was completed by 1891. Later, it formed the Eastern Railway zone. On 1 August, 1955, the former Bengal Nagpur Railway portion was separated and a new zone, the South Eastern Railway (SER), came into existence. The SER comprises four divisions, and Kharagpur is the only division to operate the suburban railway.

In the SER zone, EMU service made its maiden run on 1 May, 1968 between Howrah – Mecheda of the Kharagpur division, and on 1 February, 1969, EMU services were extended to Kharagpur. Gradually, the services were extended to eight other lines by 2003. The system under this zone was completely electrified by 1968 as 25 kV 50 Hz AC from the beginning.

== Network ==
Kolkata is the smallest of India's six A-1 cities in terms of area. However, the Kolkata Suburban Railway is the largest suburban railway network in India by track length and number of stations. The overall track length is 1,501 km (933 mi) and has 458 stations. The system is operated by two zonal divisions (under Indian Railways), Eastern Railways (ER) and South Eastern Railways (SER). The fast commuter rail corridors on Eastern Railway as well as South Eastern Railway are shared with long-distance and freight trains, while inner suburban services operate on exclusive parallel tracks. SER operates the South Eastern Line and ER operates the Eastern Line, Circular Line, Chord link Line as well as the Sealdah South lines.

Junction stations are marked in bold

Zone	Major terminal	Line	First run	Stations (with interchange)	Length	Corridors	Terminals	
South Eastern Railway	Howrah	South Eastern line	19 April 1900	87 (5)	341 km	Main line	Howrah	Midnapore
South Eastern Railway	Howrah	South Eastern line	19 April 1900	87 (5)	341 km	West branch line	Shalimar	Amta
South Eastern Railway	Howrah	South Eastern line	19 April 1900	87 (5)	341 km	Southeast branch line	**Panskura**	Haldia
South Eastern Railway	Howrah	South Eastern line	19 April 1900	87 (5)	341 km	South branch line	**Tamluk**	Digha
Eastern Railway	Howrah	Eastern line	15 August 1854	266 (23)	906 km	Main line	Howrah	**Barddhaman**
Eastern Railway	Howrah	Eastern line	15 August 1854	266 (23)	906 km	Chord line	Howrah	**Barddhaman**
Eastern Railway	Howrah	Eastern line	15 August 1854	266 (23)	906 km	West Elevated branch line	**Seoraphuli**	Tarakeswar
Eastern Railway	Howrah	Eastern line	15 August 1854	266 (23)	906 km	Far West Elevated branch line	Tarakeswar	**Bishnupur**
Eastern Railway	Howrah	Eastern line	15 August 1854	266 (23)	906 km	North branch line	**Bandel**	**Katwa**
Eastern Railway	Howrah	Eastern line	15 August 1854	266 (23)	906 km	North East branch line	**Barddhaman**	**Katwa**
Eastern Railway	Howrah	Eastern line	15 August 1854	266 (23)	906 km	Belur Math branch line	Howrah	Belur Math
Eastern Railway	Sealdah	Eastern line	15 August 1854	266 (23)	906 km	Main line	Sealdah	Gede
Eastern Railway	Sealdah	Eastern line	15 August 1854	266 (23)	906 km	Northern branch line 1	**Ranaghat**	**Krishnanagar**
Eastern Railway	Sealdah	Eastern line	15 August 1854	266 (23)	906 km	Northern branch line 2	**Kalinarayanpur**	**Shantipur**
Eastern Railway	Sealdah	Eastern line	15 August 1854	266 (23)	906 km	Mid East branch line	**Ranaghat**	**Bangaon**
Eastern Railway	Sealdah	Eastern line	15 August 1854	266 (23)	906 km	Mid North East branch line	**Dum Dum**	**Bangaon**
Eastern Railway	Sealdah	Eastern line	15 August 1854	266 (23)	906 km	East branch line	**Barasat**	Hasnabad
Eastern Railway	Sealdah	Eastern line	15 August 1854	266 (23)	906 km	Hooghly branch line	**Naihati**	**Bandel**
Eastern Railway	Sealdah	Eastern line	15 August 1854	266 (23)	906 km	Kalyani branch line	Kalyani	Kalyani Simanta
Eastern Railway	Sealdah	Eastern line	15 August 1854	266 (23)	906 km	Far North branch line	**Krishnanagar**	Lalgola
Eastern Railway	Sealdah	Sealdah South lines	2 January 1862	70 (9)	190 km	Main line	Sealdah	Namkhana
Eastern Railway	Sealdah	Sealdah South lines	2 January 1862	70 (9)	190 km	Budge Budge branch line	**Ballygunge**	Budge Budge
Eastern Railway	Sealdah	Sealdah South lines	2 January 1862	70 (9)	190 km	Canning branch line	**Sonarpur**	Canning
Eastern Railway	Sealdah	Sealdah South lines	2 January 1862	70 (9)	190 km	Diamond Harbour branch line	**Baruipur**	Diamond Harbour
Eastern Railway	Sealdah	Chord link line	1865	15 (8)	22 km	Main line	Sealdah	**Dankuni**
Eastern Railway	Sealdah	Chord link line	1865	15 (8)	22 km	Branch line	**Dankuni**	Andul
Eastern Railway		Kolkata Circular Railway	16 August 1984	20 (8)	42 km	Circular Line	**Dum Dum**	**Majerhat**
Total				458 (53)	1,501 km (933 mi)			

== Lines ==
=== South Eastern line ===
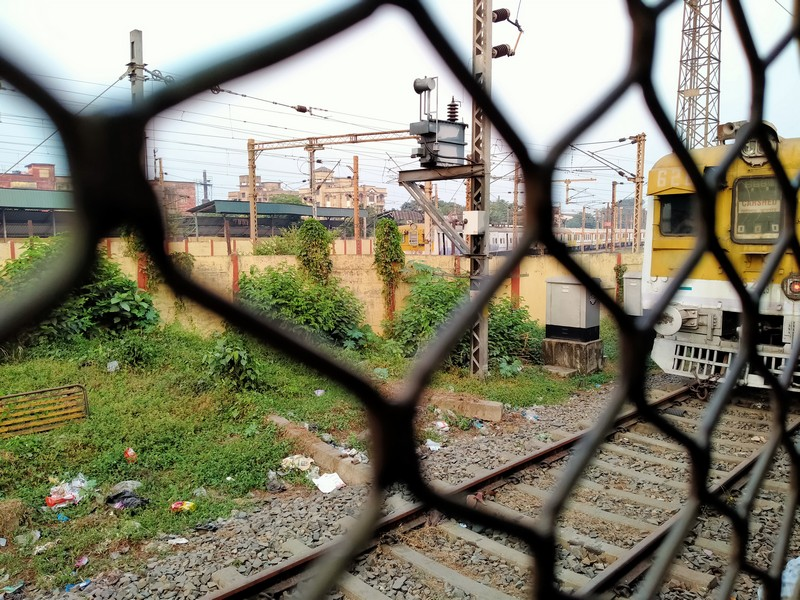
EMU carshed at Tikiapara

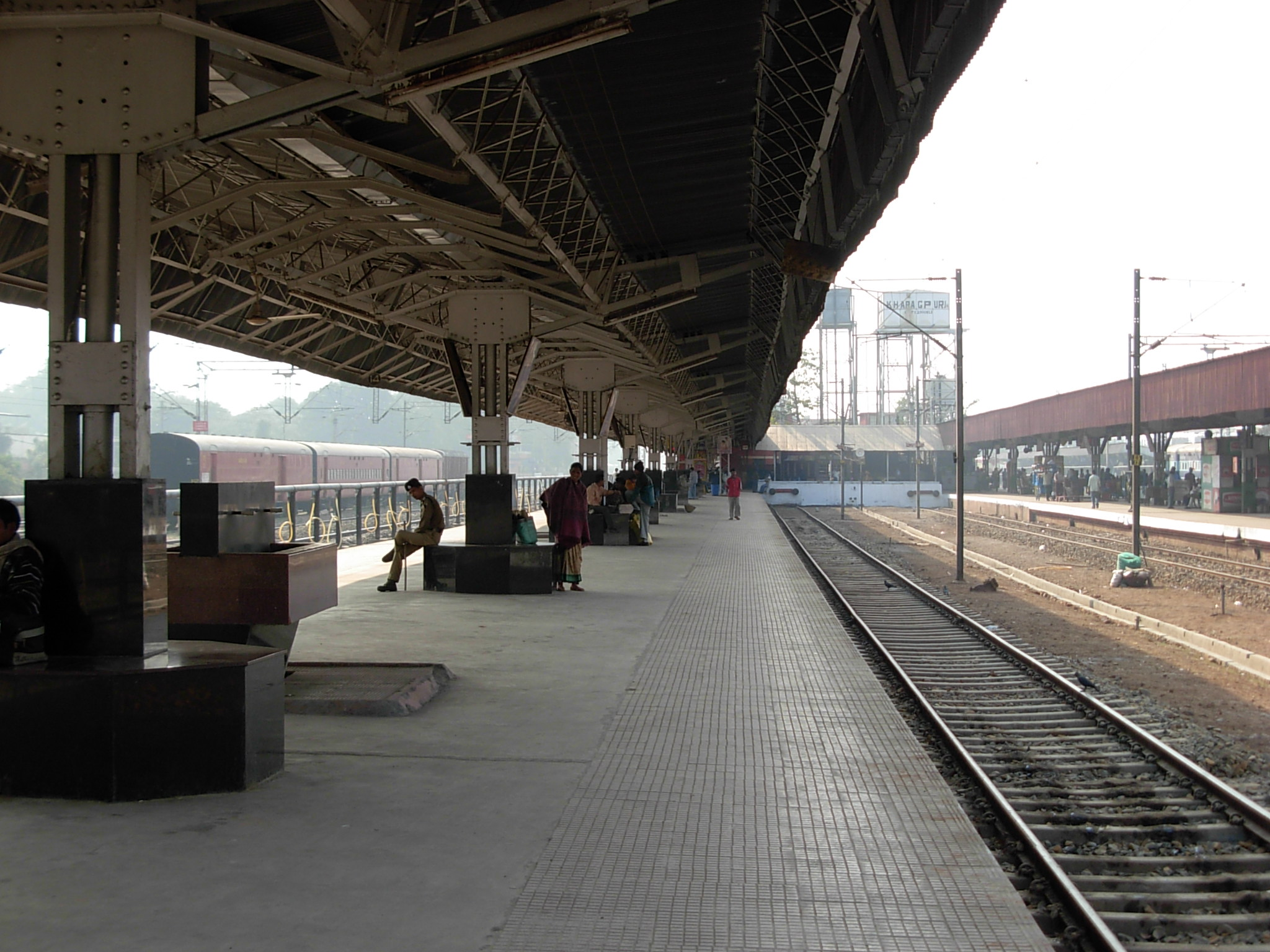
Kharagpur Junction railway station

The South Eastern line in Kolkata consists of three major corridors, which divide into two branches as they run into the suburban satellite towns. Two corridors—one local and the other through—follow the South Eastern Railway and run from Howrah Junction to Midnapore, a distance of 128 km (80 mi). The mainline bifurcates (splits) into two branch lines—the Panskura–Haldia line at Panskura Junction 69 km (43 mi) to the south-east—and the Santragachi–Amta line at Santragachi Junction 45 km (28 mi) to the north. These corridors constitute the 'main' South Eastern line. In this section, the Howrah – Santragachi section has quadruple line, where first track is mainly for up train shunting up-to Santragachhi along with some suburban trains, second track is for both up suburban and express trains, third track is mainly for down train shunting from Santragachhi along with some suburban and express trains, and the fourth and final track is for both down suburban and express trains. From Santragachhi to Kharagpur has triple line, where one track for up trains, another track for both up and down trains, and final track for down trains. All tracks are used by both suburban and express trains.The South Eastern line also includes two branch lines, 5 km (3.1 mi) and 94 km (58 mi), connecting Santragachi with Shalimar and Tamluk to Digha, respectively. The Midnapore and Haldia branches are double line, whereas Amta and Digha branches are single line.

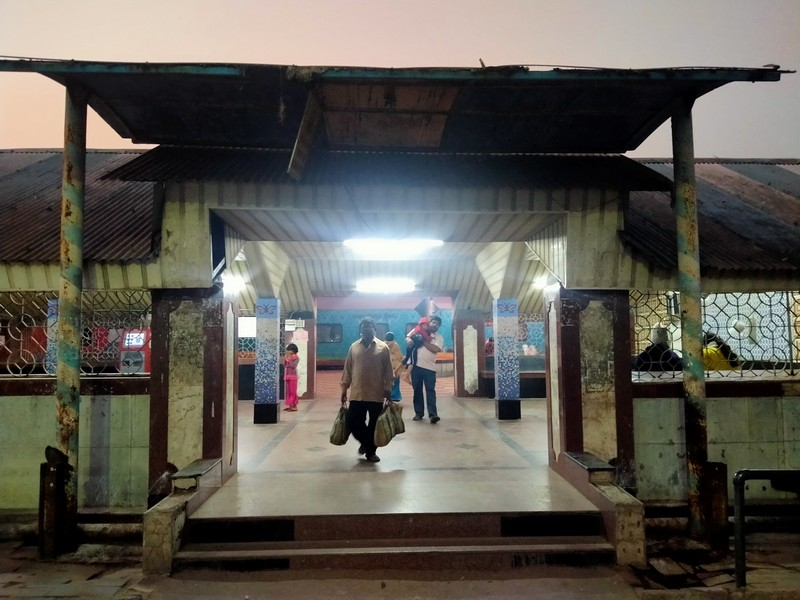
Bauria is the gateway of south Howrah

The South Eastern line has one interchange station with the Eastern Line at Howrah Junction. Rolling stock consists of a fleet of AC EMUs. The major car sheds on this line are at Kharagpur, Tikiapara, and Panskura.

On 6 September 2009, then Railway Minister, Mamata Banerjee announced the introduction of Ladies Special local trains, namely Matribhumi (i.e. motherland), in the Kolkata suburban section. The first local Matribhumi Special local ran from Howrah to Kharagpur.

=== Eastern line ===
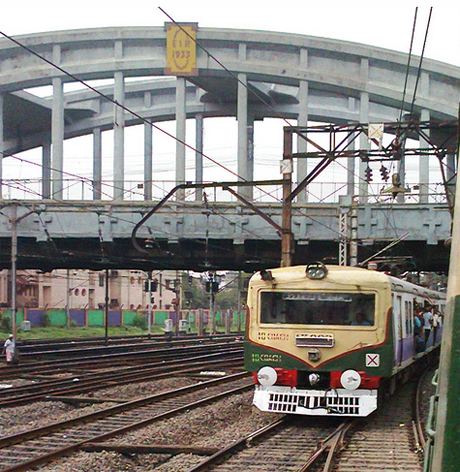
A Howrah bound BEML made 3000 series EMU train with old cream and green livery

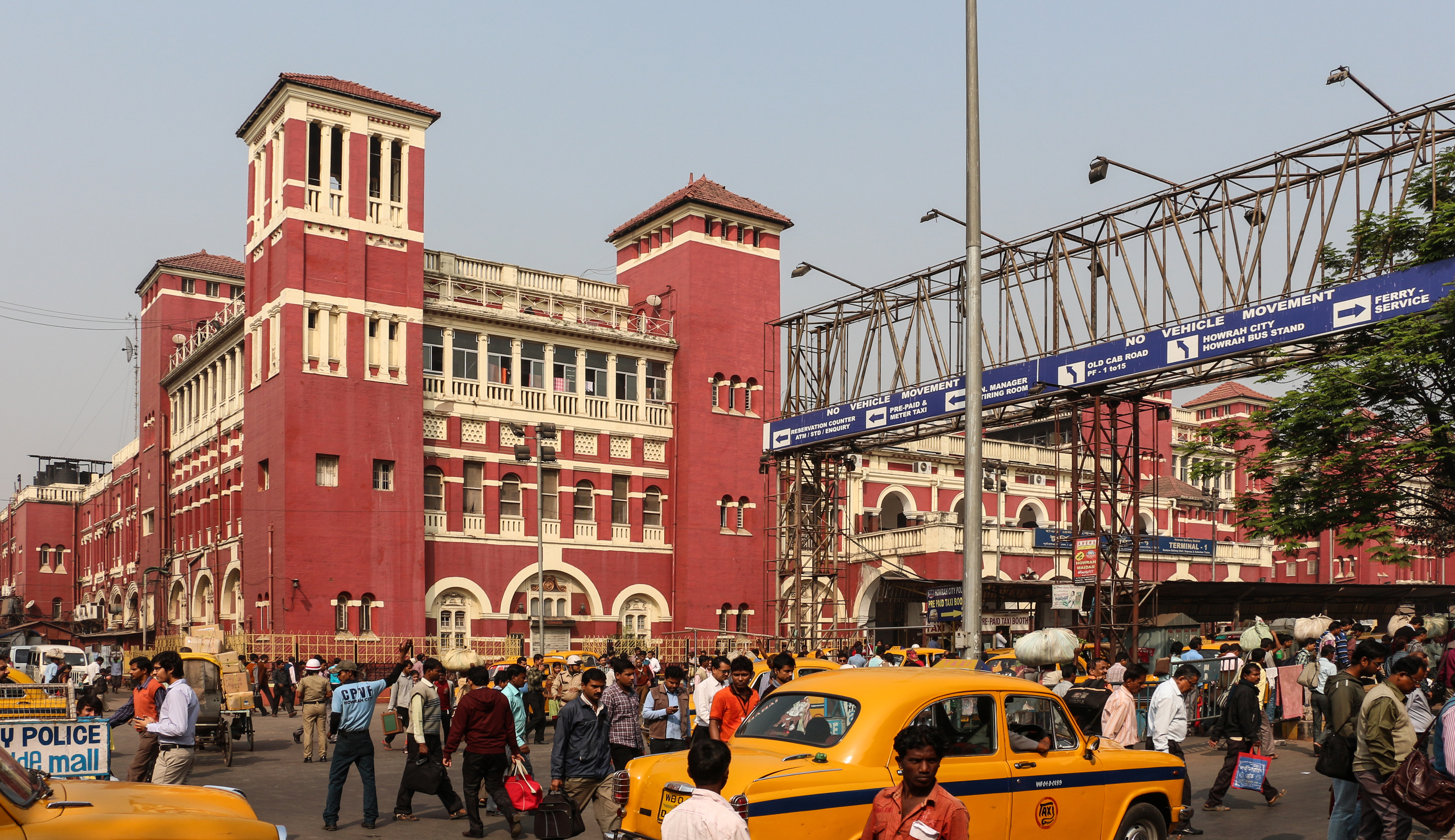
Howrah railway station (Terminal 2)

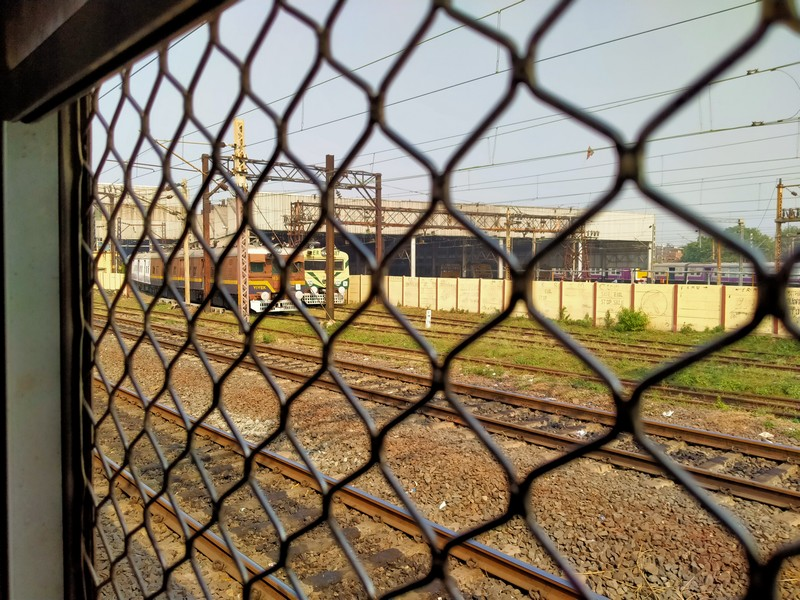
EMU carshed at Howrah (Bamangachhi)

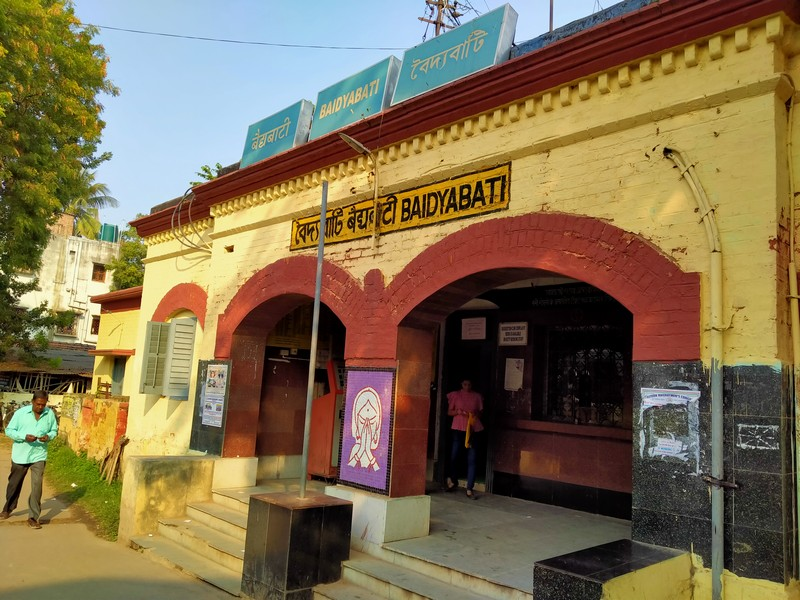
Baidyabati is the gateway of north Howrah

The Eastern line in Kolkata, the largest network of the Kolkata Suburban Railway, consists of two divisions—Howrah and Sealdah divisions (named after their respective terminals)—which serve both sides of the Hooghly River.

In the Howrah division of the Eastern line, there are five corridors, which also bifurcates and runs into the northwestern suburbs. The first two corridors are the 107 km (66 mi) Howrah–Bardhaman main line and the 94 km (58 mi) chord line. In this section, the Howrah – Bally section has quintuple line, where first and second tracks are for up and down trains for chord line, third track for up trains, fourth track for both up and down trains, and final track for down trains. From Bally to Shaktigarh has triple line, where one track for up trains, another track for both up and down train, and the third and final track for down trains. On Chord line, from Bally to Dankuni has triple line, where one track for up trains, another track for both up and down trains, and final track for down trains. From Dankuni to Shaktigarh has quadruple line up-to Chandanpur, and the rest of the portion is triple line where the fourth track is under construction. All tracks are used by both suburban and express trains. On these two corridors, the small Belur Math branch splits at Liluah, however unlike down trains, up trains of this branch does not touch Liluah station. On these two corridors, the Howrah–Tarakeswar branch line bifurcates at Seoraphuli Junction and terminates at Tarakeswar with a length of 39 km (24 mi) crossing over the chord line at Kamarkundu. Kamarkundu now this line has been extended to Bishnupur from Tarakeswar, under Tarakeswar - Bishnupur rail project. However through running from Tarakeshwar to Bishnupur is still not possible for a long gap between Goghat and Maynapur due to some land acquisition problem. After the gap, the line is running between Maynapur to Bishnupur, but due to not possibility of supplying Eastern Railway EMU rakes, that section is presently served by only one MEMU rake of South Eastern Railway. The Bandel–Katwa line bifurcates at Bandel Jn with a length of 105 km (65 mi); the Bardhaman–Katwa branch line, which was originally a narrow gauge line and later converted to broad gauge, bifurcates at Bardhaman Jn with a length of 53 km (33 mi). The Bandel - Katwa and Tarakeshwar branches are double line, whereas Belur Math, Barddhaman - Katwa and Goghat (with the isolated Bishnupur) branches are single line.

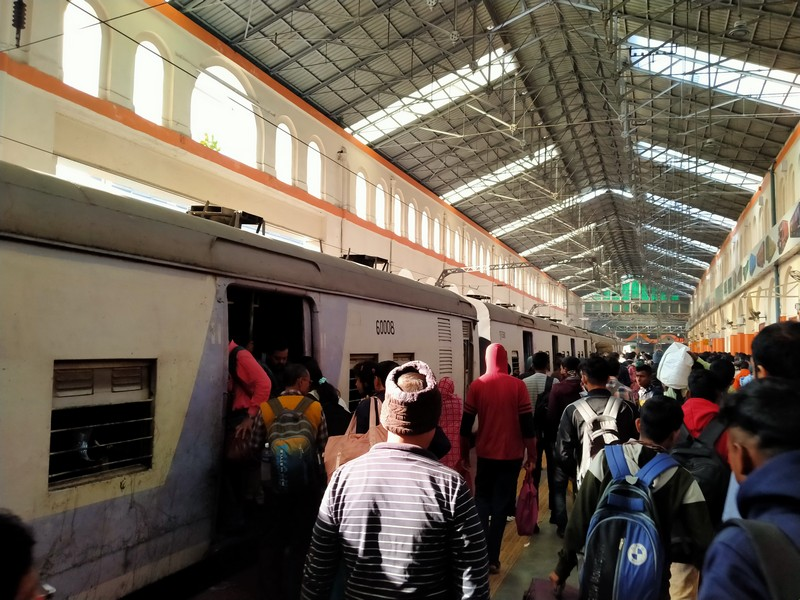
In peak hours, suburban trains often use British era shaded platformed main building in Sealdah station, which was before used only by express trains.

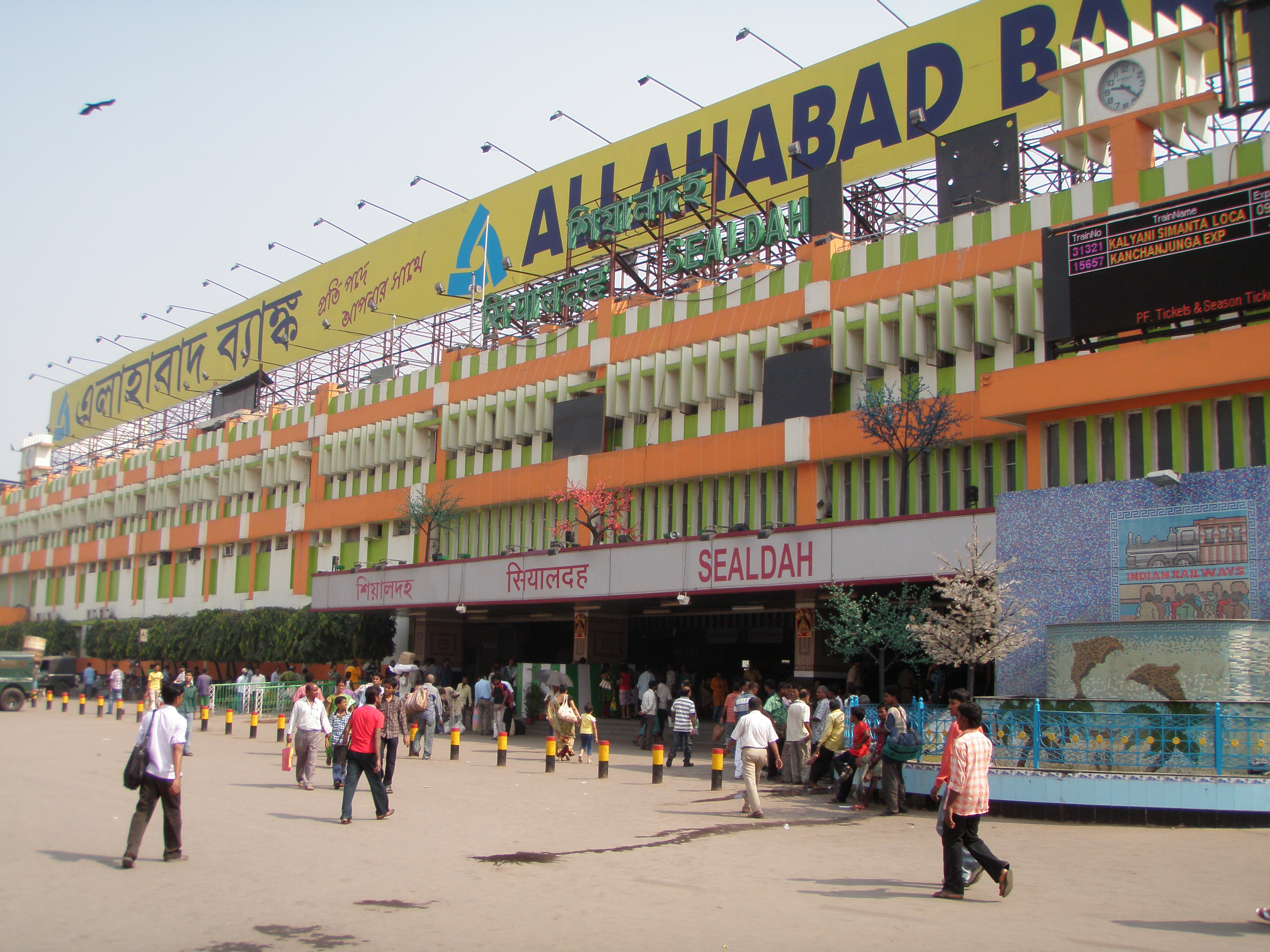
Sealdah railway station (main)

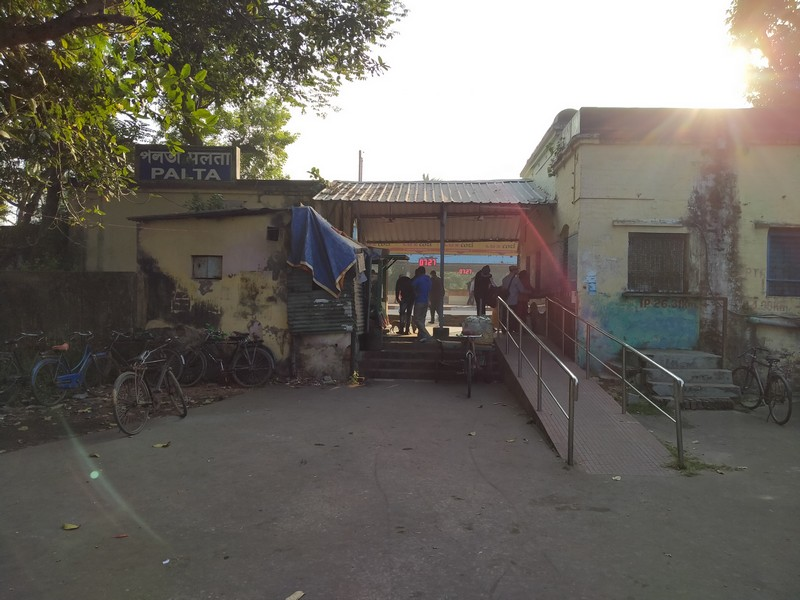
Palta is the gateway of north Kolkata

On the other side of the river, the Sealdah division of the Eastern line has seven corridors, splitting into branch lines to serve the northeastern suburbs. The Sealdah–Gede line, considered to be mainline, terminates in Gede, a small town on the India–Bangladesh Border with a length of 116 km (72 mi). In this section, the Sealdah – Naihati section has quadruple line, where first and second tracks are exclusively for up and down suburban trains, whereas third and fourth tracks are for both up and down suburban and express trains. From Naihati to Kalyani has triple line, where first and second tracks are exclusively for up and down suburban trains, and final track is for both up and down suburban and express trains. Rest of this section is double line. On this corridor, the first branch line bifurcates from Dum Dum Junction terminating at Bangaon Junction with a length of 70 km (43 mi). The second branch line bifurcates at Ranaghat Junction terminating at Bangaon Junction with a length of 33 km (21 mi). The third branch line bifurcates at Ranaghat Junction terminating at Krishnanagar City Junction passing through Kalinarayanpur Junction and Shantipur with a length of 35 km (22 mi) or by bypassing Shantipur, passing only through Kalinarayanpur with a length of 26 km (16 mi). And also there is an extension of the third branch line which starts from Krishnanagar City Junction to Lalgola with a line length of 127 km (79 mi). The fourth branch line bifurcates at Kalyani Junction terminating at Kalyani Simanta with a line length of 5 km (3.1 mi). The fifth branch line bifurcates at Dumdum Junction and terminating at Bangaon Junction, another small town on the India–Bangladesh Border with a length of 69 km (73 mi). In this branch, another branch line splits from Barasat Junction terminating at Hasnabad with a line length of 53 km (33 mi) passing through Basirhat. The Eastern line also includes a connection from Bandel Junction to Naihati Junction with a length of 8 km (5.0 mi) which is an important link between the Howrah and Sealdah divisions.

The major car sheds (depots) on this line are at Bamangachhi (Howrah) and Bandel on the Howrah division and at Narkeldanga (Sealdah), Barasat and Ranaghat in the Sealdah division.

The first Matribhumi local of Sealdah division started in October 2018; it was the first all-women passenger train in Indian Railway history. It had female motormen, guards, and security personnel. On 24 August 2015, train services were halted between the Barasat and Bangaon line after a protest by a group of passengers obstructed movement of the trains. They demanded that male passengers be allowed to travel on the Matribhumi ladies special trains. This occurred when Eastern Railway withdrew the decision to allow male passengers to travel on Matribhumi local.

=== Circular Railway ===
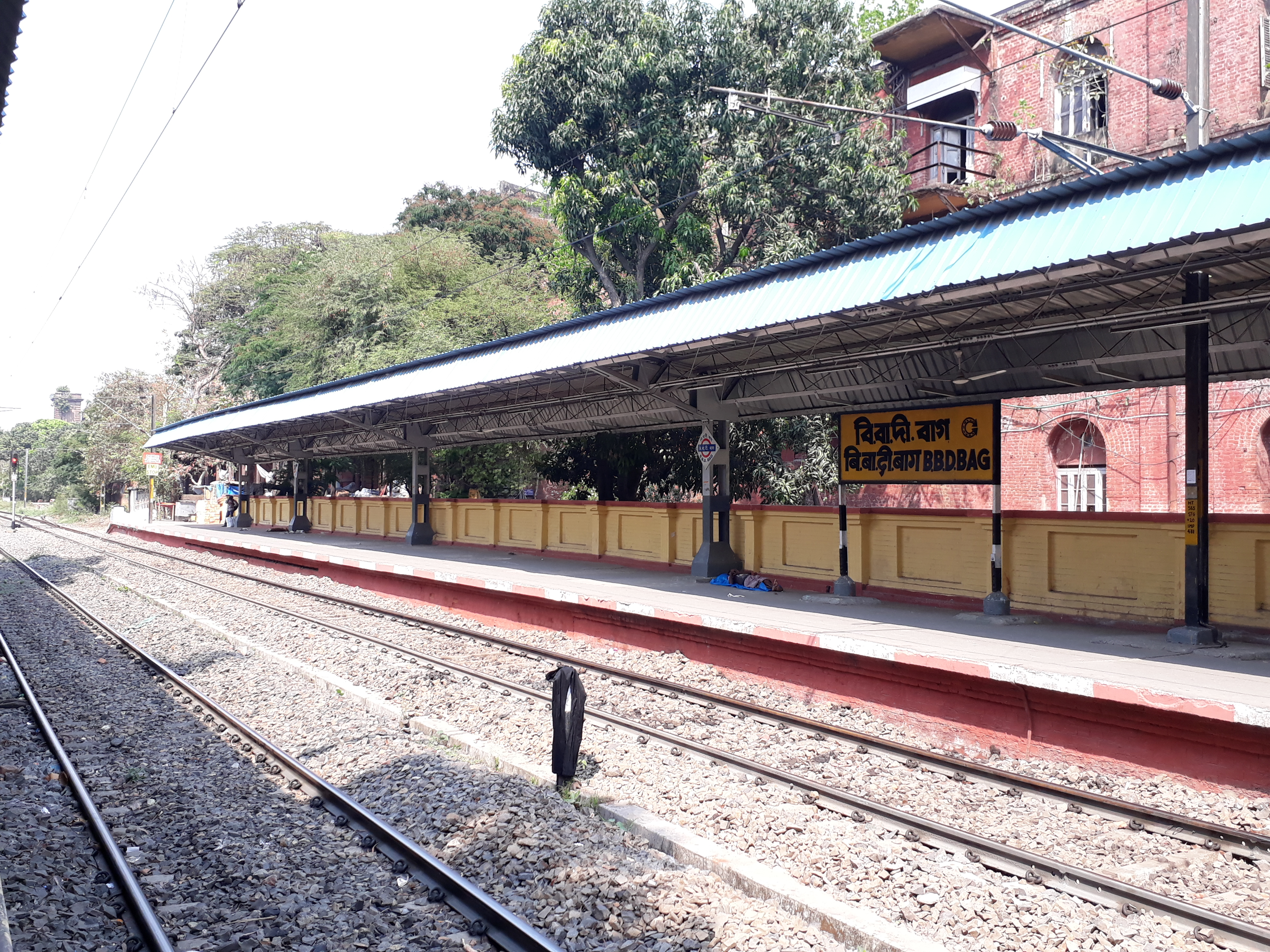
Binay Badal Dinesh Bag railway station

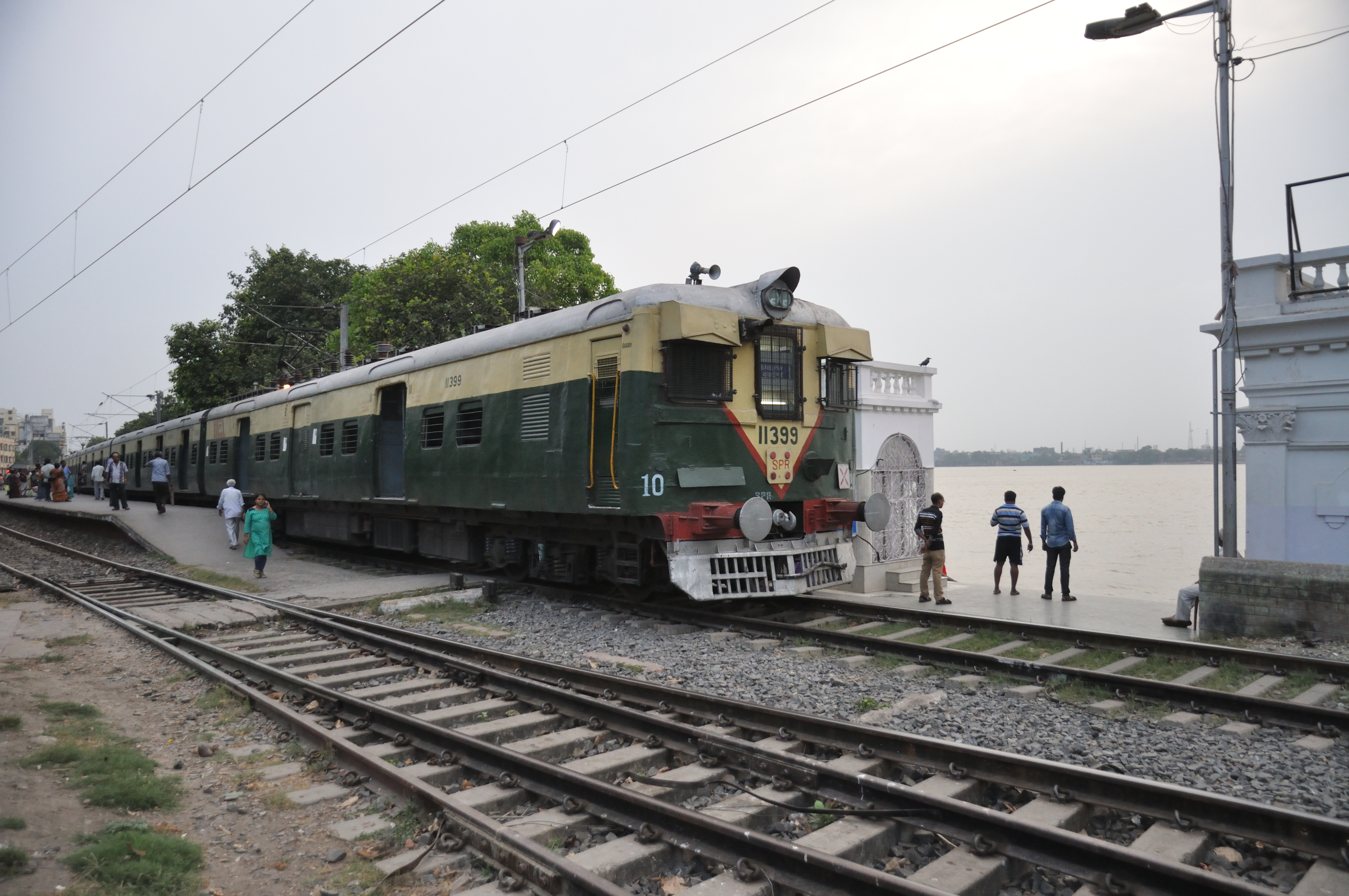
An old cream and green coloured EMU train is passing Bagbazar railway station and Mayer Ghat on the banks of Hooghly river

The Circular Railway corridor almost encircles the inner city neighbourhoods of Kolkata. With a length of 42 km (26 mi) with 20 stations, it is under the jurisdiction of Eastern Railway's Sealdah Division. The line is completely single-tracked, with an elevated section between Princepghat and Majherhat through Kolkata port area. It also passes through Kolkata railway station, the third terminal at Kolkata city. Running by the side of the Hooghly river from Bagbazar to Princepghat, it joins and runs parallel to the Sealdah South tracks after Majerhat and elevates at Park Circus in order to bypass Sealdah (which is a terminal station). After bypassing Sealdah, it rejoins the mainline at Bidhannagar Road and again terminating at Dum Dum Jn. The line is also known as Chakra Rail.

The circular line is a point of interest for tourists. As it runs under Rabindra Setu, Vidyasagar Setu and runs parallel to the Hooghly River, connecting multiple tourist places and ghats it provides access to a scenic view for daily commuters and visitors. Many trains form suburban towns enter this section, encircle the city and exit to suburban towns again, bypassing the saturated Sealdah railway station.

=== Sealdah South lines ===
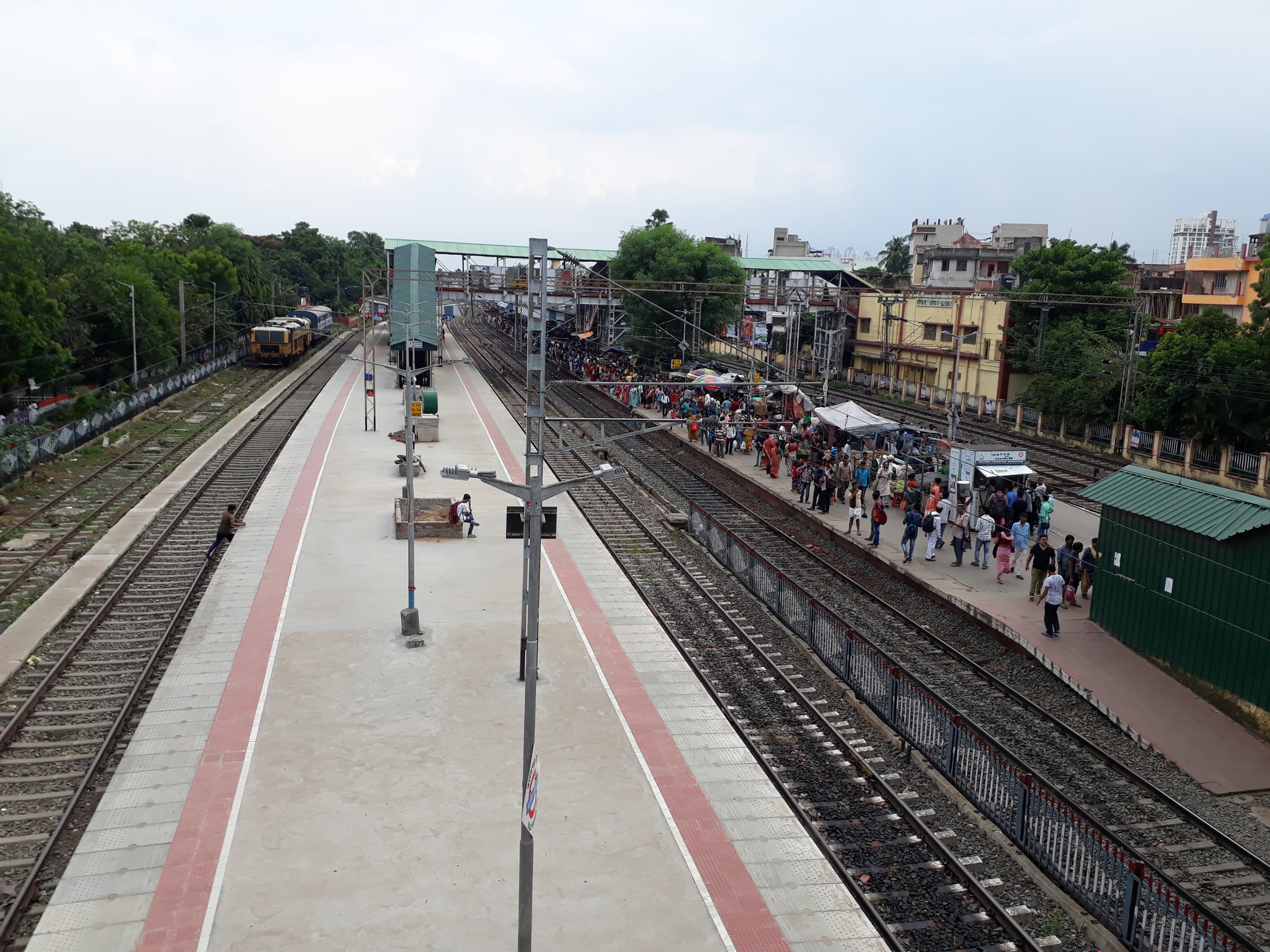
Ballygunge junction, where the Sealdah South lines diverge

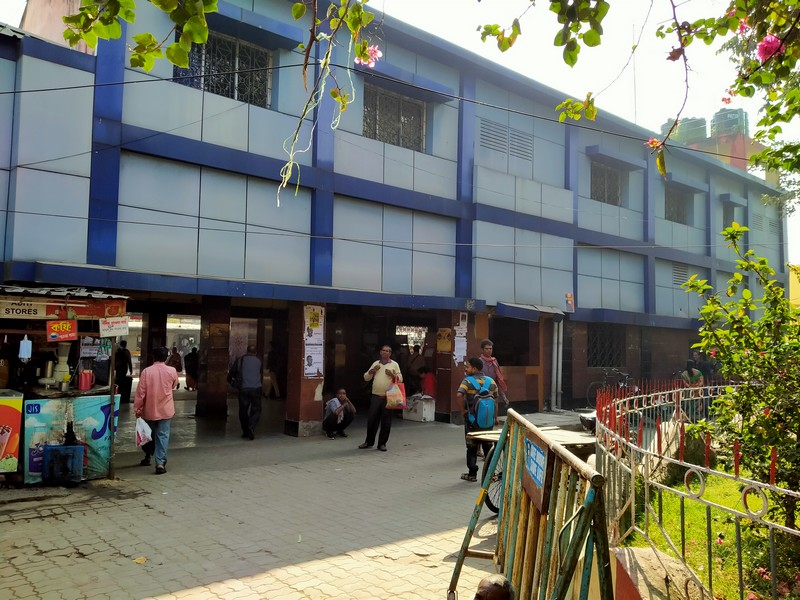
Baruipur is the gateway of south Kolkata

The Sealdah South line is an important link to Sundarbans in West Bengal from Kolkata. It is also part of the Eastern Railway. This south section is exclusively for suburban train, and no express trains run in this section. Except the Lakshmikantapur – Namkhana section, rest of the lines are completely double line. This line has four corridors, and bifurcates as branch lines linking the southern suburbs to Kolkata. The main line starts at Sealdah terminating at Namkhana railway station with a length of 110 km (68 mi). The main line is double-tracked until Lakshmikantapur railway station and single-tracked from Lakshmikantapur to Namkhana. The first branch line of this corridor starts at Ballygunge Junction terminating at Budge Budge railway station with a length of 19 km (12 mi). A second branch line starts at Sonarpur Junction terminating at Canning with a length of 29 km (18 mi). The third branch line starts at Baruipur Junction railway station terminating at Diamond Harbour railway station with the length of 35 km (22 mi). This line has a sole depot at Sonarpur.

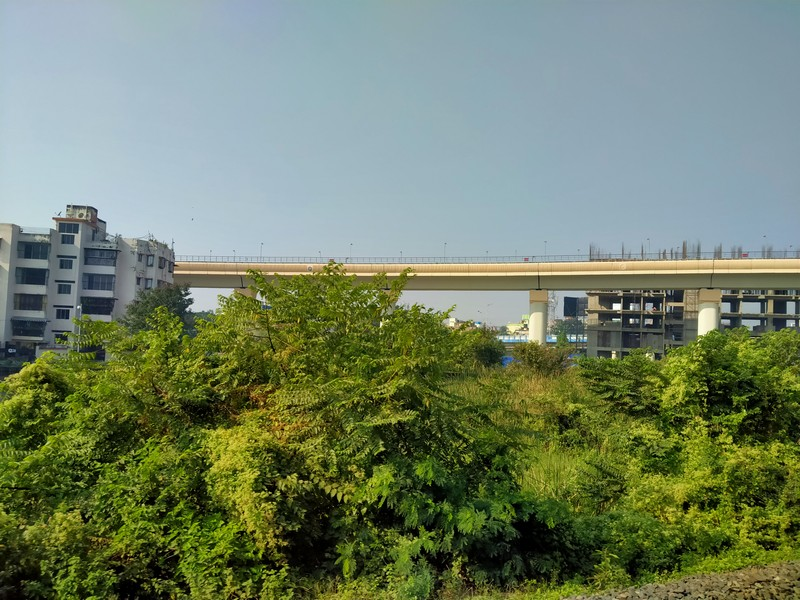
Kolkata metro orange line is crossing Sonarpur line near New Garia.

This line has three interchange stations, at Majerhat and Park Circus with Circular Railway and at Sealdah for Eastern line. Kolkata metro Blue Line and Orange Line meet with this line at New Garia station and smooth interchange facility available.

=== Chord link line ===
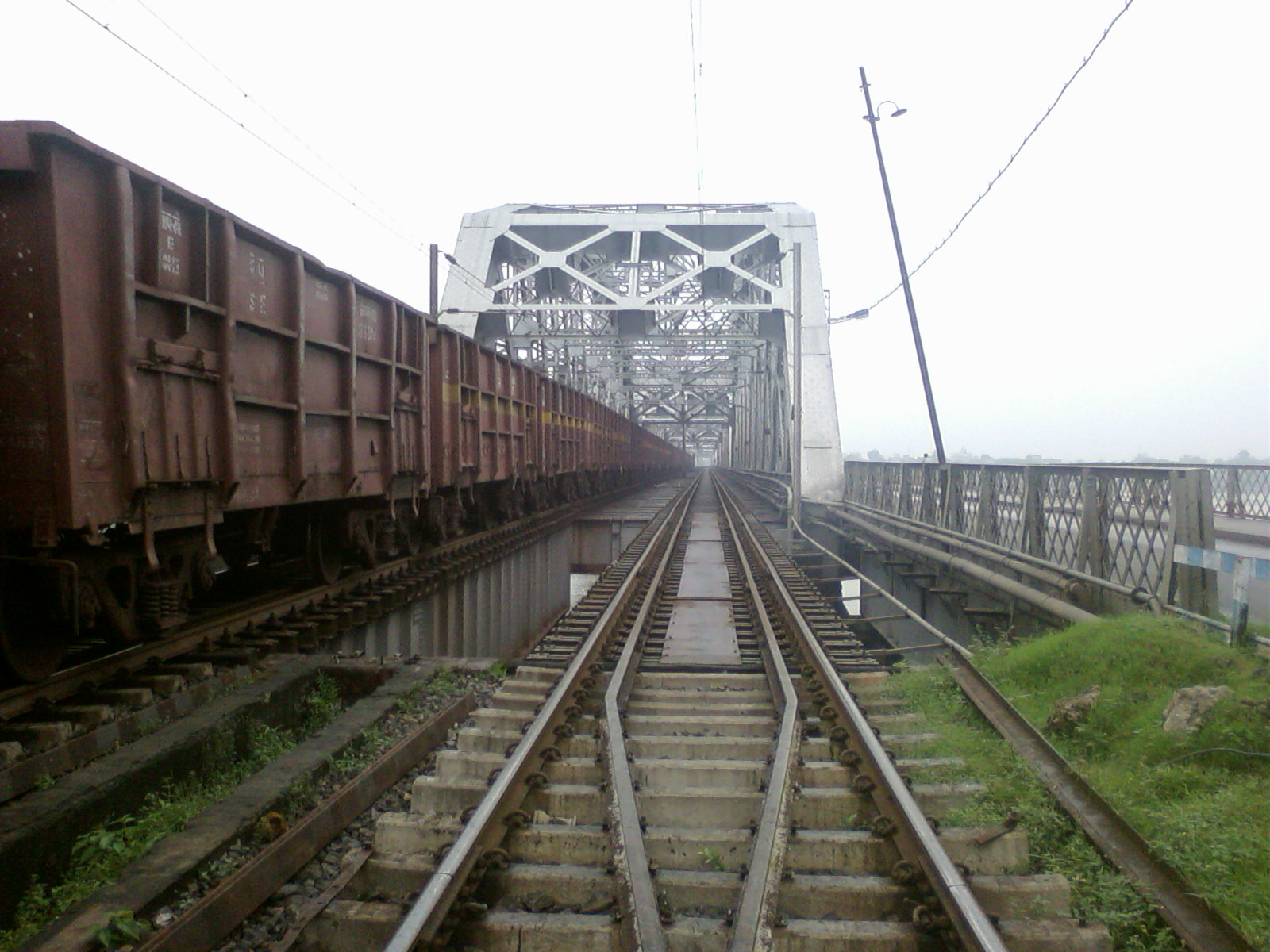
Vivekananda Setu over River Hooghly, Chord link line (Dankuni line)

The Chord link line connects Sealdah to Dankuni Junction on the Howrah–Barddhaman Chord. This line splits from the main line at Dumdum Junction. This is fully double line and used by both suburban and express trains. This line plays an important role in connecting the Sealdah Division's mainline with the Howrah–Bardhaman chord, which is primarily used by freight and passenger trains heading towards North India(The Howrah–Bardhaman chord is part of the Howrah–Delhi mainline and the Grand Chord). The Chord link crosses the Hooghly River on the Vivekananda Setu road-rail bridge.

This corridor has a famous tourist spot, the Dakshineswar Kali Temple, where Ramakrishna Paramhansa served as a priest. It also includes the road-cum-rail bridge, Vivekananda Setu, also known as the Bally Bridge.

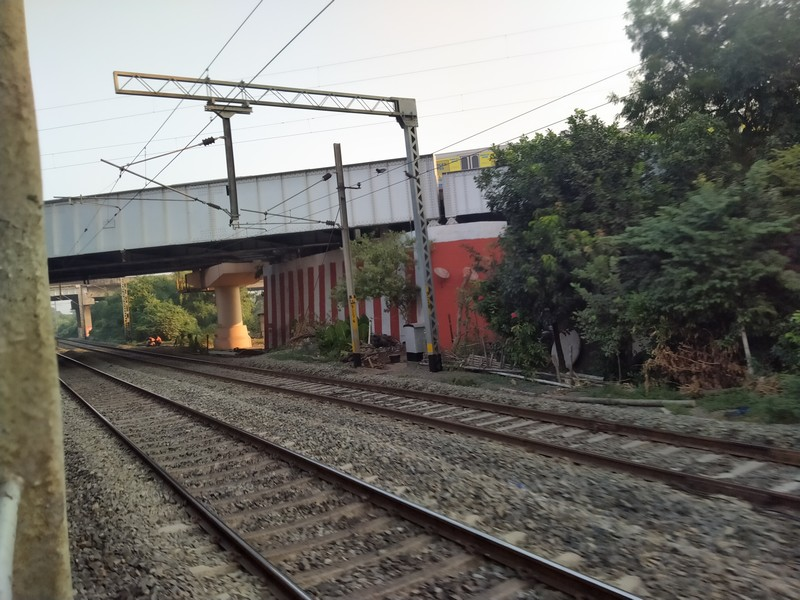
A blue line metro, running parallel with Dankuni line, crossing Palta line near Baranagar

It has three interchange stations. Interchange is possible at Dum Dum Junction for the Eastern line (Sealdah–Gede mainline), at Dankuni Junction for the Eastern line (Howrah–Barddhaman Chord) and at Bally Halt (lying above Bally station) for the Eastern Line (Howrah–Barddhaman mainline). Kolkata metro Blue Line runs parallel to this line between Dumdum and Dakshineshwar, and has interchange facilities at Dum Dum, Baranagar and Dakshineswhar stations.

== Expansion ==
During 2009-10, a new line between Amta and Bagnan was sanctioned by the South Eastern Railway. With a length of 16 km (9.9 mi), it was expected to cost ₹195 crore (US$21 million). However, as of March 2016, only 3% of the corridor had been completed due to the non-availability of 168 acres of land. The same year, another new line between Machhalandapur and Swarupnagar with a length of 15 km (9.3 mi) was sanctioned by the Eastern Railway at a cost of ₹104 crore (US$11 million). However, no tenders were called because the required 83.48 hectares land was not available. In 2008-09, the 82.50 km (51.26 mi) Tarakeswar–Bishnupur railway line was sanctioned at a cost of ₹2,082 crore (US$220 million). As of April 2025, 72.07 km (44.78 mi) has been commissioned.

On the southern part of the Eastern Railways side, a 14.05 km (8.73 mi) expansion between Ghutiari Sharif and Canning, along with further extensions between Bhangonkhali–Basanti (14.30 km (8.89 mi)) and Basanti–Jharkhali (23 km (14 mi)), were approved in 2009-10 at a cost of ₹611.03 crore (US$65 million). A second expansion between Kakdwip railway station and Budhakhali was approved in 2011-12 with a cost of ₹61.85 crore (US$6.6 million). With a length of 5 km (3.1 mi), it extends to Sagar Island on the Hooghly River delta. Since the island can only be reached by boat, expansion of this line would be a boon for its people, providing better connectivity. The third expansion is at Namkhana and Bakkhali with a length of 31 km (19 mi), and a fourth expansion between Kulpi railway station and Bahrarat with a length of 38 km (24 mi). However, due to land acquisition and political problems, although the projects are not officially dead, but progress is very very slow.

== Operations ==
=== Services and security ===
Three types of local train services are operated. They are normal locals, trains which stop at every station; galloping locals, trains which have limited stops and skip the smaller stations; and women-only trains known as Matribhoomi local. The Railway Protection Force (RPF) and Government Railway Police (GRP) are responsible for the security of Kolkata Suburban Railway. The major stations in Kolkata also have closed-circuit cameras.

=== Travel classes ===
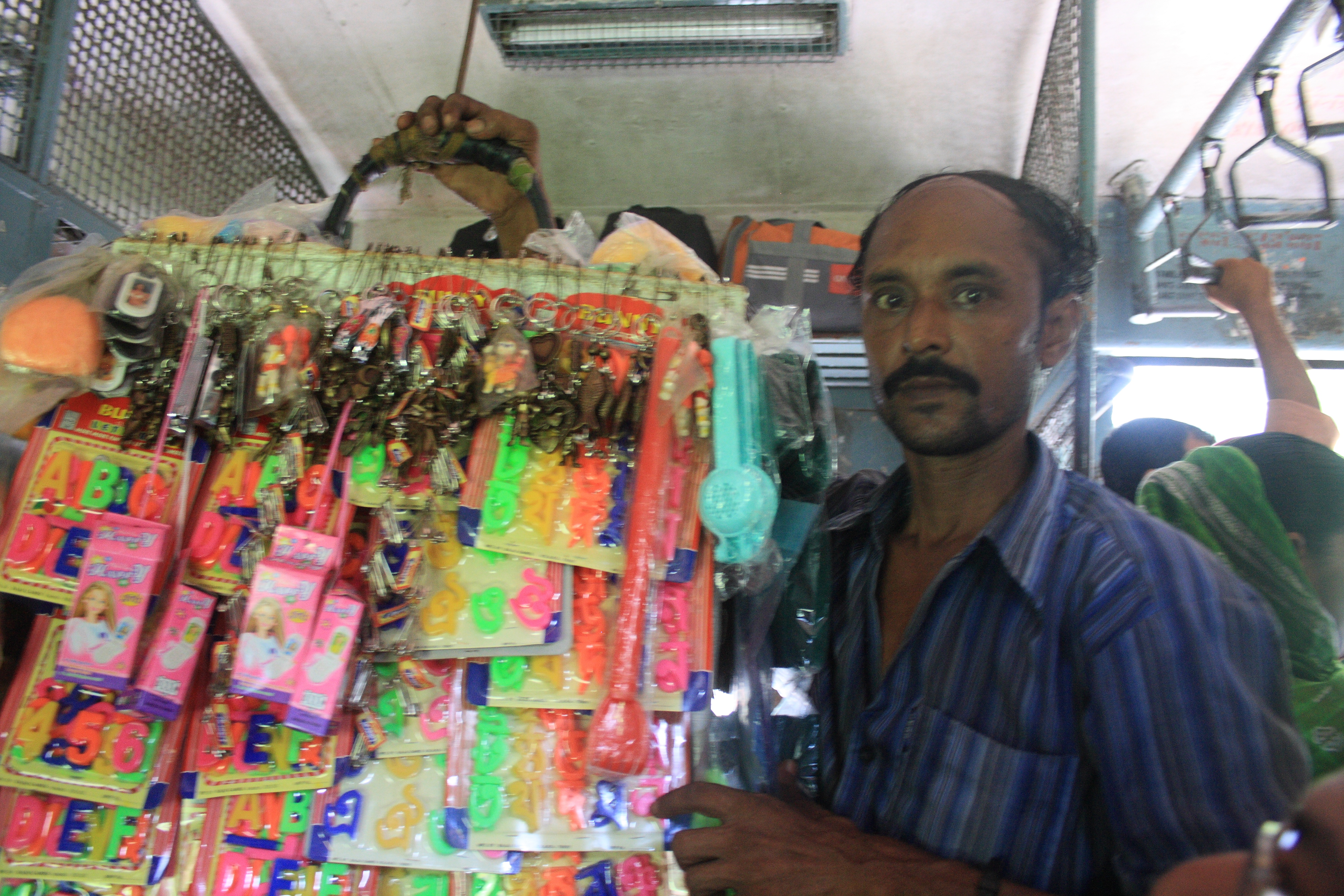
Vendor on train

There are three travel classes:

1. Class II: These are regular compartments, where anyone can travel. The last rows on both ends of the compartment are reserved for physically challenged and senior citizens.
2. Class L: These compartments are exclusively reserved for women. Men are not allowed in them. The second compartment from both ends is for ladies. Sealdah Division, however increased their ladies reserved coach to 3, including half of third coach on both ends. (locally called Katabogi)
3. Vendor: These are for vendors to transport heavy goods and luggage. The compartments have seats along the walls and are made to haul goods. Half of the third compartment from both ends is for vendors.
4. Divyangjan: These compartments are the first compartments on both sides, where some seats are reserved for senior citizens, physically disabled people and the patients.
5. AC FC: These are the AC compartments of AC EMU local.
6. Unlike Mumbai Suburban railway and Chennai Suburban railway, Kolkata suburban railway has no Class I coaches, although these were in past but later removed. But once again from 2024, First Class were made available in the Ladies Special trains.

=== Ridership ===
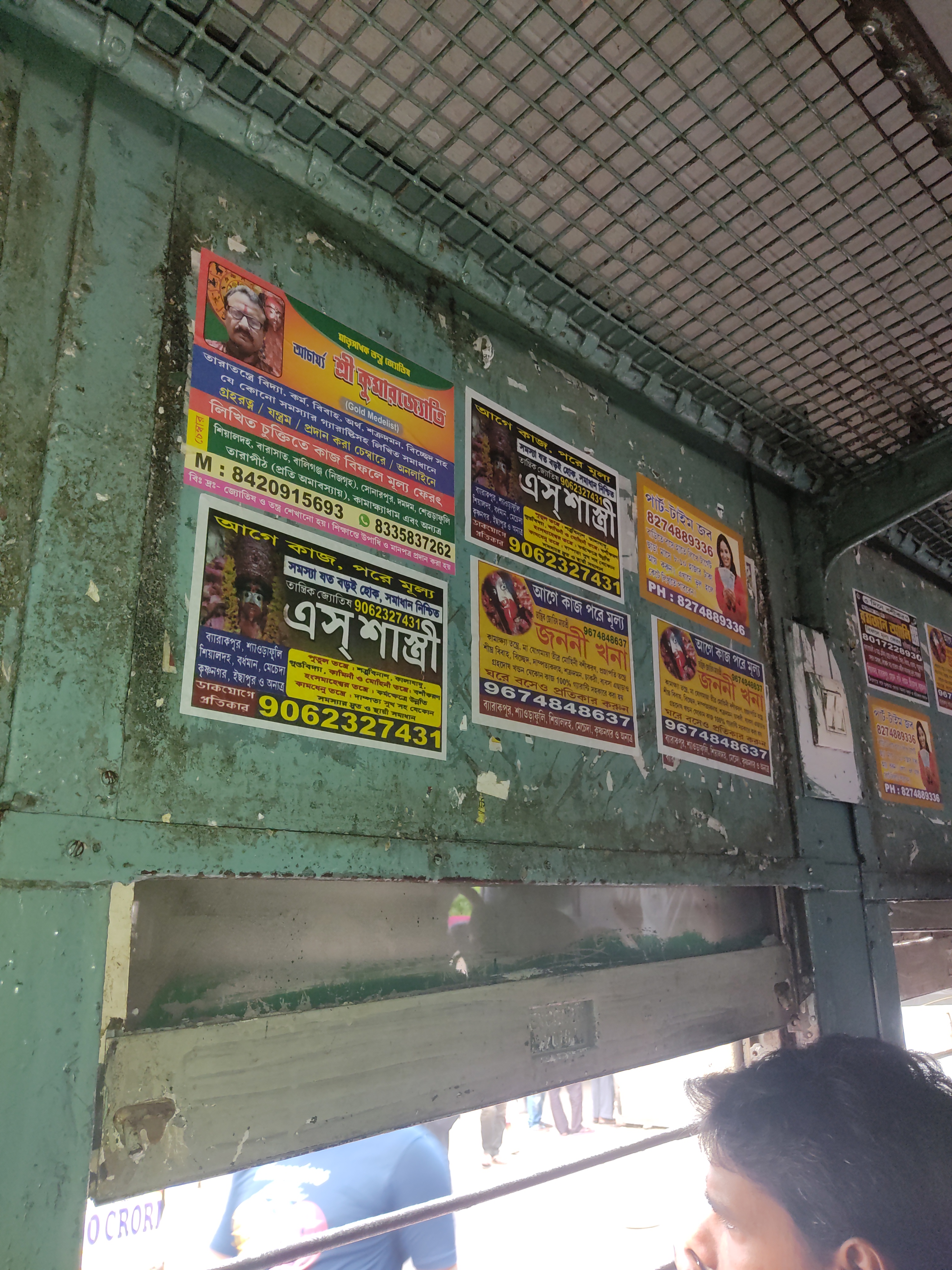
Like every other public transport in Kolkata, illicit third party advertisement posters are common on its rolling stock.

During 2010–11, there was an average of 1,275 trains per day. The average passenger capacity per rake was 6,207. In 2014–15, the average number of trains was 1,511 with an average passenger capacity per rake of 4,141. In the last five years, there was an increase of three percent in the average number of trains per day and reduction of eight percent in the average number of passengers per rake. The number of passengers carried in 2013–14 was 1,150,000,000 and in 2014–15 was 1,120,000,000—a reduction of three percent in total trips. The daily ridership as of 2017–18 is 3,500,000.

=== Fares and ticketing ===
In the 2013 Railway Budget, the Railway Board increased the Kolkata suburban ticket fare by eight paise per kilometre, although the railway ministry has hiked it by two paise per kilometre. The number of slabs has also been reduced to four—₹5 (5.3¢ US), ₹10 (11¢ US), ₹15 (16¢ US) and ₹20 (21¢ US)—from the eight slabs earlier. Also, ticket denominations have been rounded off to multiples of ₹5 (5.3¢ US). As per the revised slab, a person travelling up to 20 km (12 mi) will have to pay ₹5 (5.3¢ US), between 21 km (13 mi) and 45 km (28 mi) ₹10 (11¢ US), between 46 km (29 mi) and 70 km (43 mi) ₹15 (16¢ US), and between 71 km (44 mi) and 100 km (62 mi) ₹20 (21¢ US). One can buy a monthly, quarterly or season ticket if commuting regularly on a particular route. This allows unlimited rides on that route. Season tickets are the most cost-effective and time-efficient option for regular commuters.

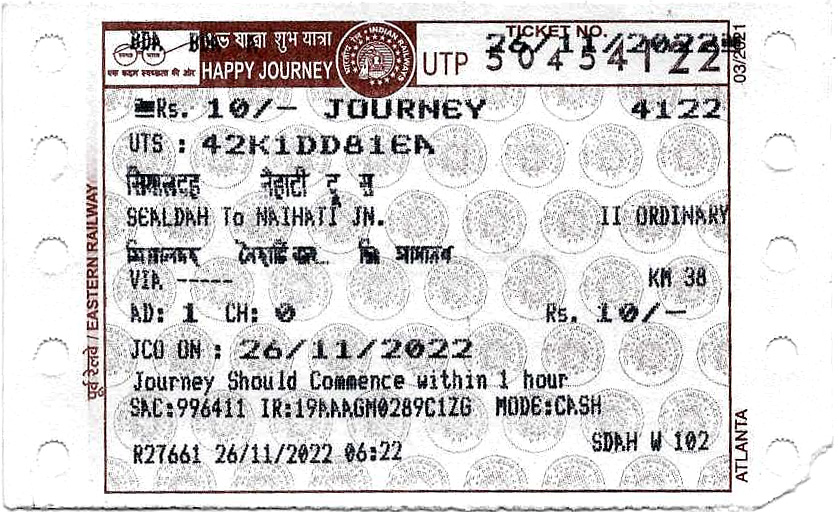
Typical computerised Kolkata suburban train counter bought ticket with dot matrix printing

Kolkata Suburban Railway uses a proof-of-payment fare collection system. Tickets can be bought for a single journey (one way) or a return journey. Travelling without a valid ticket is an offence and if caught can result in a penalty. As per the Indian Railway Report, in 2016–17, the Eastern Railway and the South Eastern Railway generated ₹539.8 million (US$5.8 million) through penalties imposed on ticketless and irregular travelers, an increase from 2013 to 2014 with ₹112 million (US$1.2 million).

Offline tickets can be bought from the unreserved ticket counters present at every station and Cash/Smart Card operated Ticket Vending Machines (CoTVM) and Automatic Ticket Vending Machines (ATVM) installed in most of the stations. One can issue online tickets using the UTSOnMobile app.

=== Non-suburban routes ===
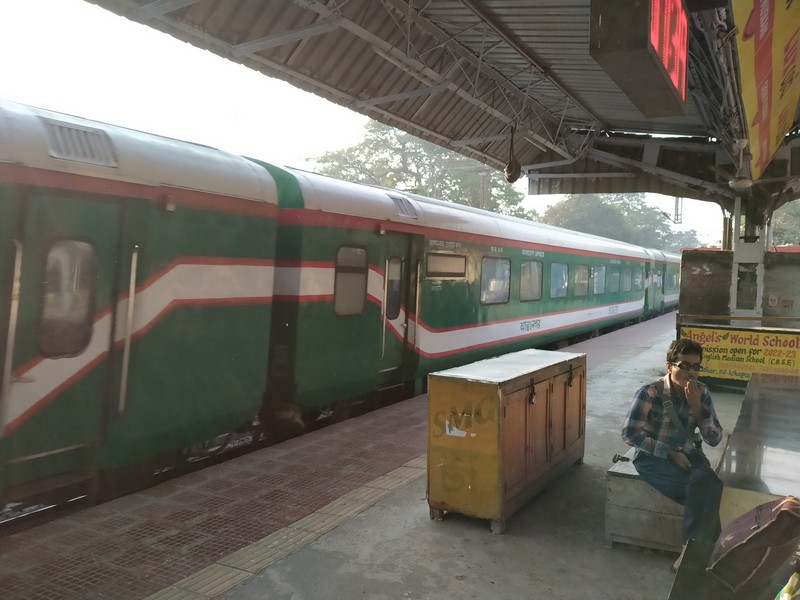
Until recent political disturbance, Maitri Express served Kolkata and Dhaka

Some routes do not have any regular EMU services and therefore bypass the Kolkata Suburban Railway Network. To connect people on these routes, passenger trains run to help transport people from small towns and villages to the Kolkata Metropolitan Area and vice versa. There are two routes that bypass the Kolkata Suburban Railway and are not connected to any other network. The first route is from Tamluk to Digha, which is under the jurisdiction of South Eastern Railway with a length of 94 km (58 mi). The second route is from Krishnanagar City Junction to Lalgola, which is under the jurisdiction of Eastern Railway with a length of 128 km (80 mi).

== Infrastructure ==
=== Rolling stock ===
The Electric Multiple Units (EMUs) for the Kolkata suburban services were built domestically at the Integral Coach Factory (ICF), Perambur; the first EMU rolled out in September 1962.

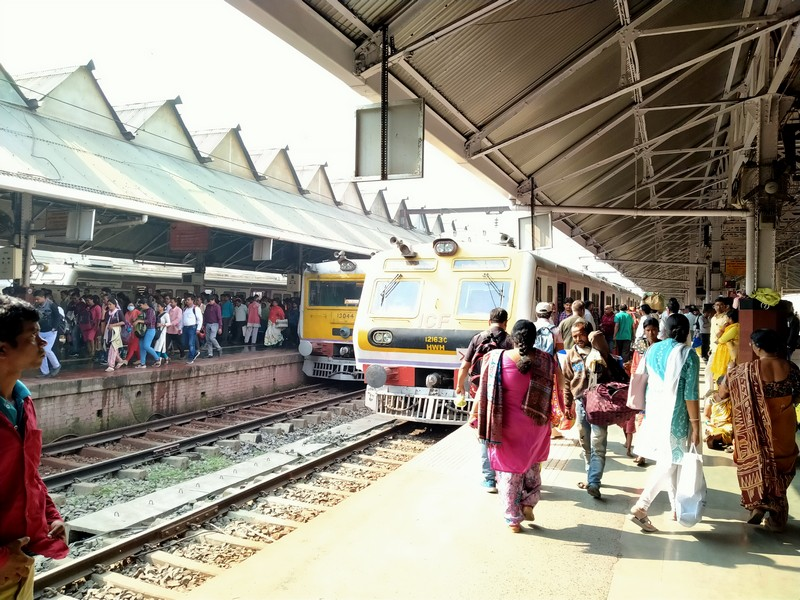
Left - 2nd generation EMU train with large single front glass. Right - 4th generation (latest) EMU train with medium twin front glasses with inbuilt electronic destination board.

The Howrah division of Eastern Railways has a rolling stock of 12-coach EMUs made by Jessop, ICF and Titagarh Wagons. BEML EMU's have been purchased and are in use. A few Unique BEML stainless steel EMUs are also in service. A small fleet of 12-coach Siemens EMUs are also in service. MEMU Rakes from the Rail Coach Factory, Kapurthala (RCF) and Diesel multiple units (DEMUs)) from the ICF are in service. Howrah division has 61 12-car rakes.

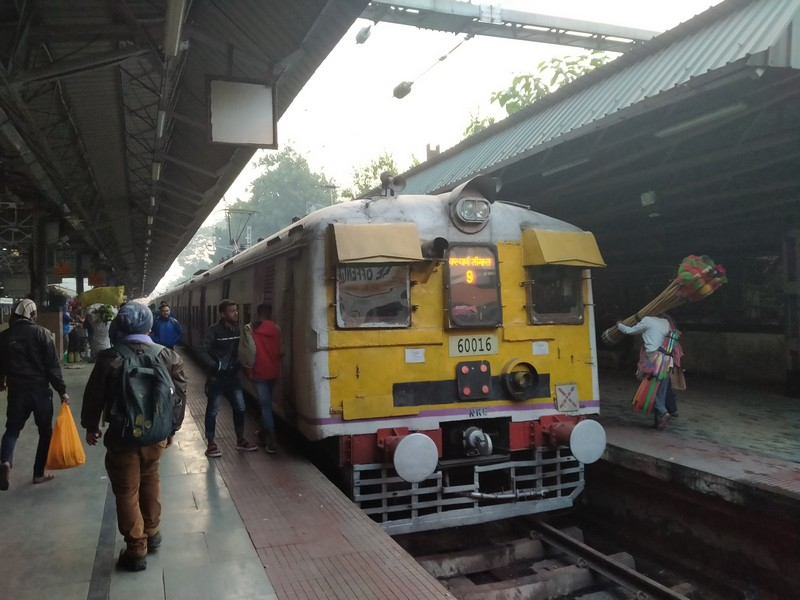
Classic 1st generation EMU train with twin small front glasses and sun guards

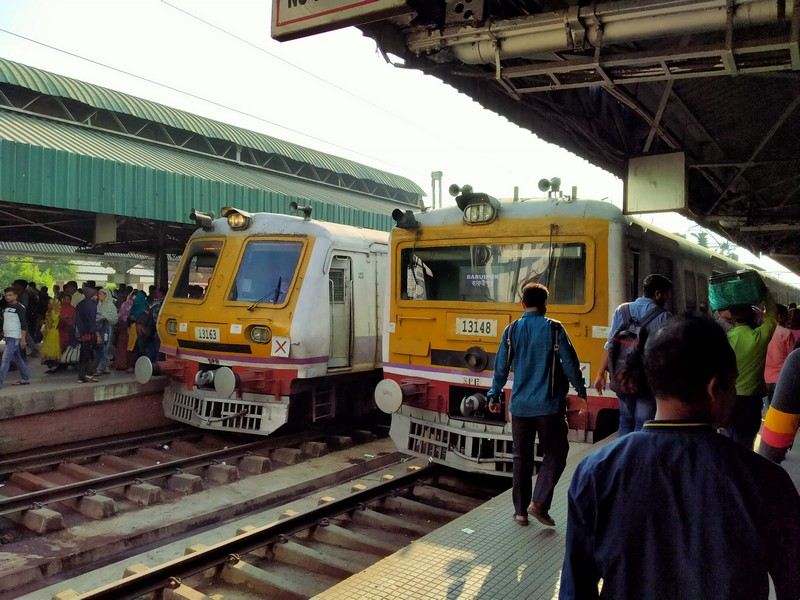
Left - 3rd generation EMU train with large twin front glasses and curved face. Right - 2nd generation EMU train with large single front glass

The Sealdah division has rolling stock including nine and 12-coach EMUs, also made by Jessop, ICF and Titagarh Wagons. A small fleet of Siemens 12-coach EMUs is also in service. BEML EMU's have been purchased and are in use and a small number of unique BEML stainless steel EMUs are also in service. DEMU trains made by ICF and MEMU from Rail Coach Factory, Kapurthala (RCF) are in service. The number of 12-car EMU rakes in Sealdah division is 125. There are some Mainline Electric Multiple Unit (MEMU) rakes also.

The South Eastern Railways uses 12-coach EMUs made by Jessop, Siemens, Titagarh Wagons and ICF. BEML EMUs have been purchased and are in use. A few unique BEML stainless steel EMUs are also in service. SER was the first Division in West Bengal to use the ICF Medha 3-phase rakes. DEMU rakes from ICF and MEMU from RCF are in service. In February 2018, SER launched Medha ICF Rakes on the Howrah–Kharagpur route and on 15 April 2018, Eastern Railway also started using them on the Howrah–Bandel Route. SER has 30 12-car EMU rakes.

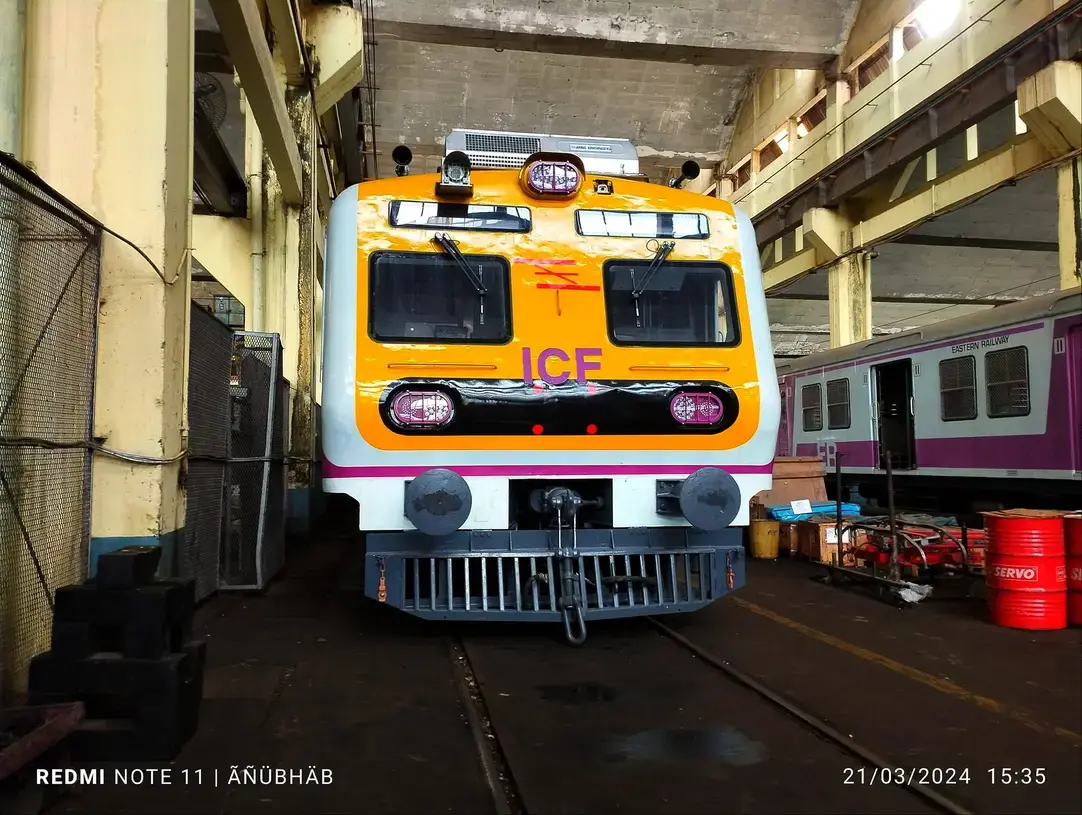
3-phase Alstom EMU in a carshed of Kolkata

Every division of the Kolkata Suburban Railway are rapidly replacing their old Jessop and ICF EMUs with the latest Medha 3-phase EMU rakes made by ICF with Bombardier Transportation (now Alstom). Almost all the EMU Units used by the Kolkata Suburban Railway are equipped with a GPS-based passenger information system. Some EMUs, which were previously in service with the Western Line of the Mumbai Suburban Railway, were later shifted to Kolkata for service.

On 18 June 2025, Eastern Railway's first air-conditioned EMU arrived in Ranaghat carshed to run on the Sealdah-Ranaghat Line. On 10 August 2025, Kolkata Suburban Railway's first AC local between Sealdah and Ranaghat was inaugurated.

Number of rakes in ER
Division	EMU		MEMU
Division	9-car	12-car	MEMU
Howrah	–	61	–
Sealdah	–	125	2
(As of 2024)

Number of rakes in SER
Division	EMU		MEMU
Division	9-car	12-car	MEMU
Kharagpur	–	30	–
(As of 2019)

=== Electrification and gauge ===
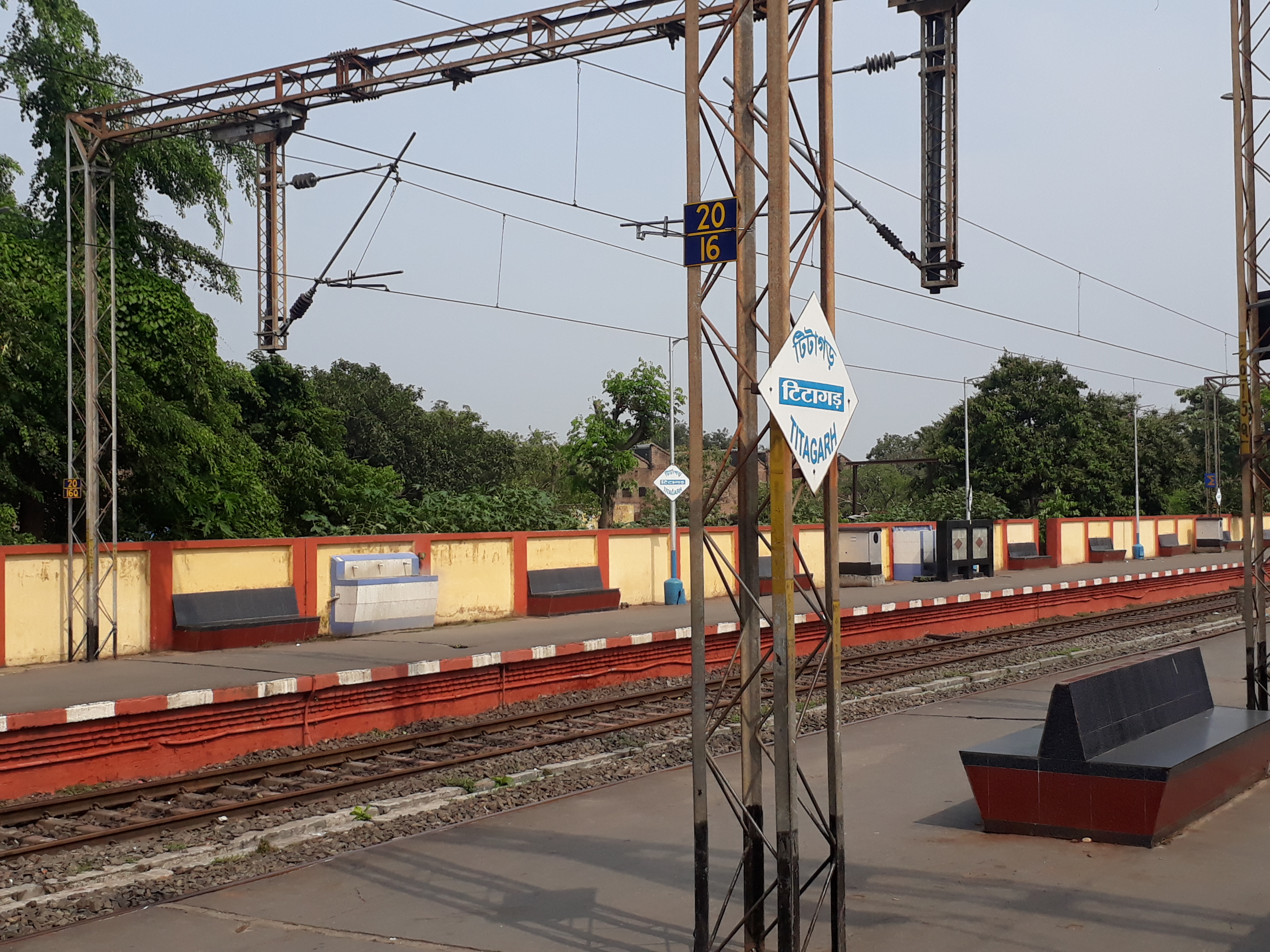
Electrification and overhead catenary in Titagarh railway station

The Howrah to Bardhaman section of Eastern Railway, got equipped with 3000 V DC electrification by 1958. Following the research and trials by SNCF in Europe, Indian Railways decided to adopt 25 kV AC system as a standard in 1957, as it was found more economical, and by 1968 the mainlines of both zones were electrified with 25 kV AC traction. Branch lines and other lines were gradually electrified later. On 5 January 2015, the Kalinarayanpur to Krishnagar City Junction route via Shantipur was totally converted into electrified broad gauge from narrow gauge with three phases, Phase-I was from Krishnanagar City Junction to Shantipur Junction which was commissioned on 7 February 2012; Phase II was from Shantipur Junction to Phulia which was commissioned on 30 January 2014; and the last, Phase III, for Phulia to Kalinarayanpur was commissioned and later EMU services begun. On 12 January 2018, the Barddhaman to Katwa line was totally converted to electrified broad gauge from narrow gauge with two phases—Phase-I Barddhaman to Balgona and Phase-II Balgona To Katwa began to be converted beginning on 30 May 2012. Currently, the network has a 25 kV overhead catenary electrification system, with 5 ft 6 in (1,676 mm) Indian broad gauge tracks.

=== Signalling and telecommunication ===
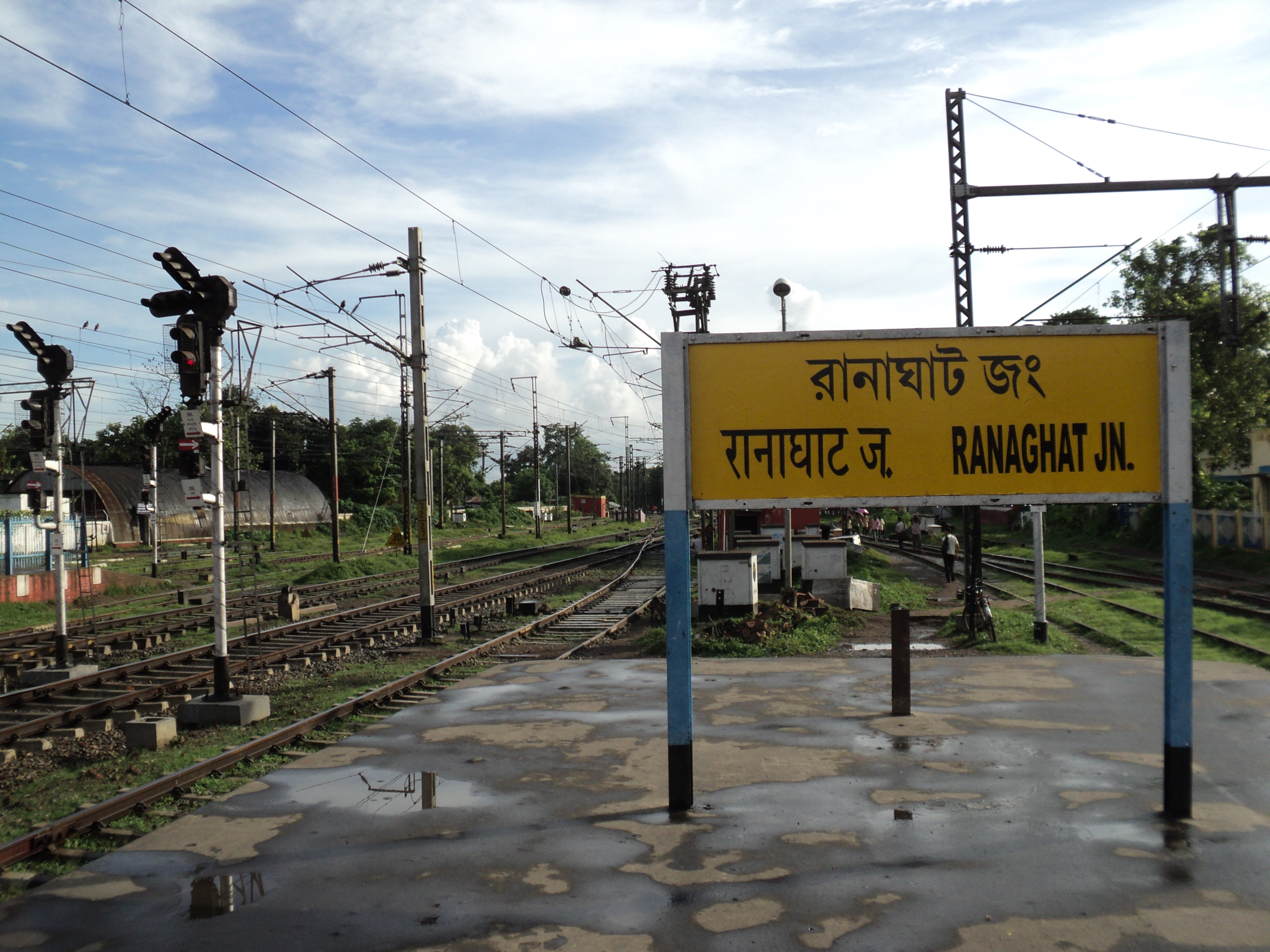
Signalling at Ranaghat Junction railway station

An electronic interlocking signalling system is most widely used, replacing the old lever frames/panel interlockings system. To increase sectional capacity and efficiency, automatic signalling is being used. This is controlled by AC/DC track circuits, axle counters etc. The axle counter system is used to detect the presence of a train in an absolute block section, point zone area of a station and level crossings.

An optical fibre communication system is the backbone of the telecommunications network. The telecommunications facility is an omnibus circuit between stations and the central control hub at Sealdah and Howrah. For ground based mobile communication, Mobile Train Radio Communication (MTRC) is used.

== Incidents ==
In the early 1980s, down Kalyani Simanta local overshot the down starter signal at Kalyani rail station and rammed into up Krishnagar City local which was coming into pf. 1 from the opposite direction. Eye-witnesses say the 'head' of the down local hit the 'belly' of the up local. Several coaches derailed, and passengers sustained injuries as both trains were going slow (10kmph). Services on the mainline were suspended for a few days and the derailed rakes kept laying in Kalyani outers for several months.

Two local trains (Sealdah–Shantipur EMU local and Shantipur–Sealdah EMU local) collided on the same track at Phulia railway station on 7 January 2012. One person was killed and several were injured. Three coaches of both trains derailed.

On 12 December 2013, an accident was averted as two trains arrived on the same line at Sealdah Station. The driver of the Sealdah–Lalgola passenger train which left from platform seven had overshot the starter signal and entered the down main line but stopped upon noticing the Bangaon–Sealdah local, which was coming from the opposite direction. This was reported to the control room and the passenger train was hauled back to platform seven of Sealdah Station.

Fourteen passengers were injured when an explosion took place inside a compartment of the Sealdah–Krishnanagar local train early on the morning of 12 May 2015. The blast took place just after a person boarded the train at Titagarh station, which is 21 km (13 mi) from Sealdah. Train services along the Sealdah Section were normal. However, two trains were cancelled as train movement was affected following the incident.

On 17 November 2015, a 40-year-old man, who had boarded the Howrah–Bandel Matribhumi special local for women only, fell off the train and died between Uttarpara and Hind Motor stations. This incident occurred when the man boarded the train. Some female commuters surrounded and abused him. He was eventually forced to get off the train. When the man realized a station was approaching, he ran to grab the handle but missed it and fell from the train to his death.

On 19 July 2017, a train from Sonarpur Jn to Sealdah (South) Station broke the buffer and hit the wall of platform number 13 in Sealdah (South) Station. This incident happened in the morning around 10:25 am (IST).

On 4 September 2018, Majerhat Bridge which was 40 years old, collapsed on the rail line between Majerhat and New Alipore at around 4:45 pm (IST), which results in the death of 3 people while injuring at least 25 others. After the collapse, Eastern Railways suspended train services via Majerhat railway station on the Kolkata Circular Railway and Sealdah-Budge Budge lines temporarily.

On 28 September 2018, one woman was killed while another woman sustained serious injuries after a slab of a foot over-bridge (FOB) at Baruipur railway station in South 24 Parganas fell on them from a height of 30 ft (9.1 m). This incident happened at night. According to locals and daily passengers, the foot over-bridge was in bad condition due to lack of maintenance.

There was a stampede on a foot over-bridge at Santragachi railway station in West Bengal on 23 October 2018. Two people died and twelve others were injured, including two children and two women. This incident occurred because of the arrival of two trains at the same time. People rushed to board the trains and that created a stampede-like situation on the bridge.

On 2 October 2019, a local train coming from Masagram derailed while entering platform number 6 of the Howrah railway station. No casualties were reported. This incident happened around 8:10 pm IST.

On 15 March 2020, a massive fire broke out in the Salimpur slum area which lies near the Dhakuria railway station track at around 8:30 am. No casualties were reported. After this incident, Sealdah South lines were suspended temporarily.

On 30 November 2022, 2 EMU trains grazed each other while travelling in the same direction on adjacent tracks outside Sealdah railway station. No injuries were reported.

== See also ==
- Eastern Bengal Railway
- Bengal Nagpur Railway
- Trams in Kolkata
- Transport in Kolkata
- Mumbai Suburban Railway
- Delhi Suburban Railway
- Chennai Suburban Railway
- Bengaluru Suburban Railway
- Hyderabad Multi-Modal Transport System
- List of suburban and commuter rail systems
