= Naihati Junction railway station =

Railway station in West Bengal, India

Naihati Junction নৈহাটি জংশন
- Naihati Junction station building in 2023

General information
- Location: Rishi Bankimchandra Road, Naihati, North 24 Parganas district, West Bengal; India
- Coordinates: 22°53′15″N 88°25′05″E
- Elevation: 16 metres (52 ft)
- System: Indian Railways; Kolkata Suburban Railway
- Owner: Indian Railways
- Operator: Eastern Railway
- Lines: Sealdah– Naihati- Ranaghat Main line of Kolkata Suburban Railway; Naihati–Bandel link of Kolkata Suburban Railway
- Platforms: 6
- Tracks: 9

Construction
- Structure type: At grade
- Parking: Not available
- Cycle facilities: Not available
- Accessible: available

Other information
- Status: Functioning
- Station code: NH
- Zone(s): Eastern Railway
- Division(s): Sealdah

History
- Opened: 1862; 164 years ago
- Electrified: 1963–1965; 61 years ago
- Former names: Eastern Bengal Railway

Services
Preceding station	Kolkata Suburban Railway	Following station
Kankinara towards Sealdah	Eastern Line Main line	Garifa towards Bandel Junction
Kankinara towards Sealdah	Eastern Line Main line	Halisahar towards Ranaghat Junction
Route map
Location
- Location within West Bengal Location within India

Naihati Junction is a Kolkata Suburban Railway junction station on the Sealdah–Naihati line and Naihati–Bandel link. It is located in North 24 Parganas district in the Indian state of West Bengal. It serves Naihati and the surrounding areas.

== History ==
The Calcutta (Sealdah)-Kusthia line of Eastern Bengal Railway was opened to traffic in 1862. Eastern Bengal Railway worked on the eastern side of the Hooghly River, which in those days was unbridged.

In 1857, the Eastern Bengal Railway (EBR) was constituted to lay the railway tracks along the eastern bank of the Hooghly River up to Kushtia. The Jubilee Bridge linking Bandel and Naihati was opened on 21 February 1887, so that up country freight traffic could be transported to the Kolkata port.

With the opening of the Jubilee Bridge in 1887, Naihati was linked to Bandel on the Howrah–Bardhaman main line.

== Railway service ==
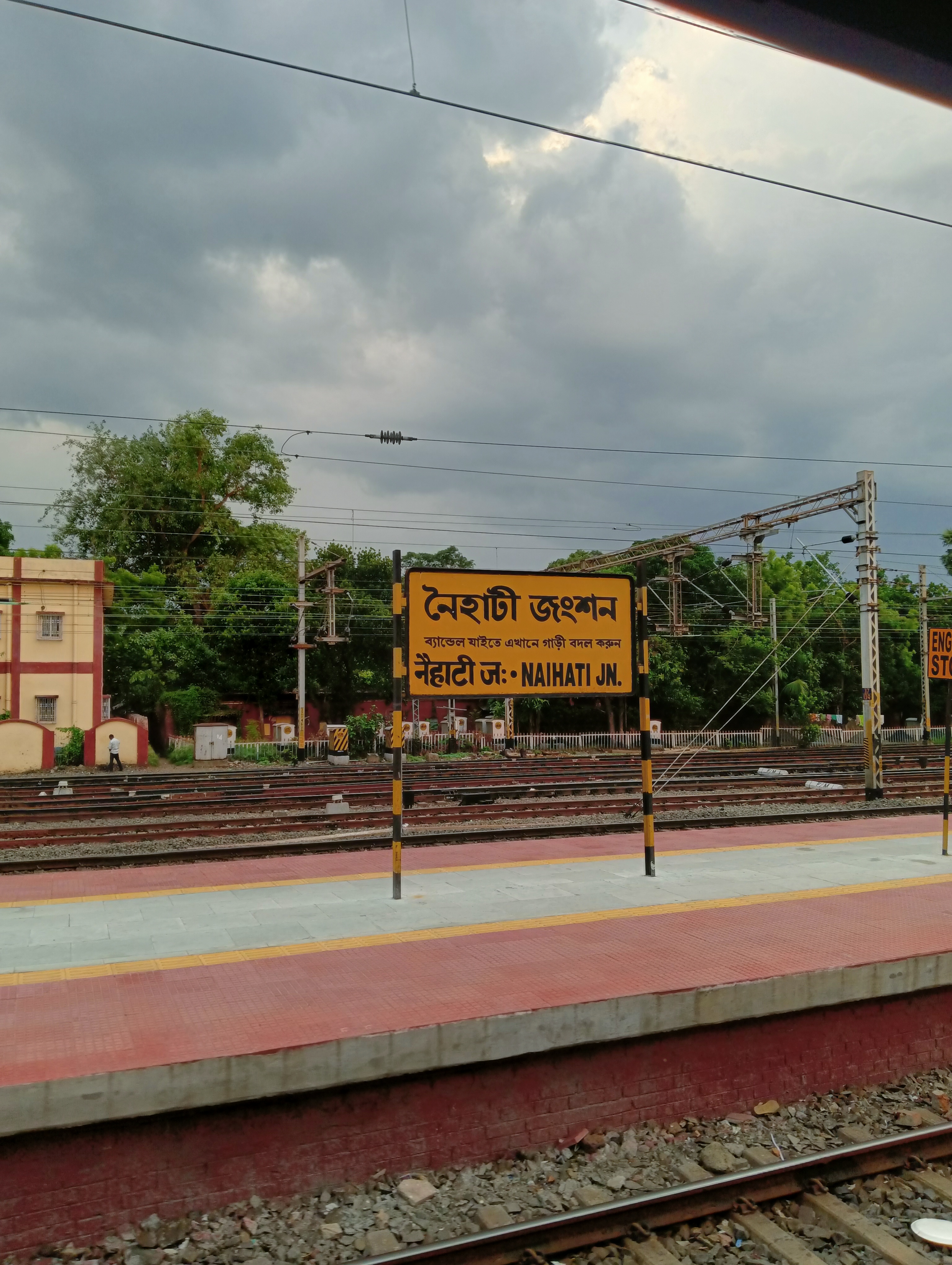
Naihati Station Board

Naihati Junction railway station is situated at about 38 km from Sealdah on the Sealdah–Ranaghat line and at about 16 km from Barrackpore. It is a NSG 2 grade high priority junction station. It connect Sealdah Division and Howrah Division via Naihati Bandel Branch line. It is a part of the Kolkata Suburban Railway system. It is connected to Bandel on the Howrah–Bardhaman main line. The journey takes about 20 minutes.

== Station complex ==
The platform is very much well sheltered. It has many facilities including water and sanitation. There is a proper approach road to this station. Escalators were installed in 2019. 2 Foot over bridges are on service and 1 in under construction

== Electrification ==
The Sealdah–Ranaghat sector was electrified in 1963–65 and the Bandel–Naihati link in 1965–66.

== Carriage and wagon depot ==
The carriage and wagon depot at Naihati handles such work as checking of air and vacuum brakes and repair of sick lines. Bangladesh bound trains are checked and repaired.

== Coaching terminal ==
A new coaching terminal was proposed at Naihati in the rail budget for 2012–13. A museum in honour of Bankim Chandra Chatterjee has also been proposed.

== Multifunctional complex ==
Indian Railways are planning for a multi-functional complex near Naihati railway station to provide rail users facilities such as shopping, food stalls and restaurants, book stalls, telephone booths, medicine and variety stores.

== Sampreeti Bridge ==
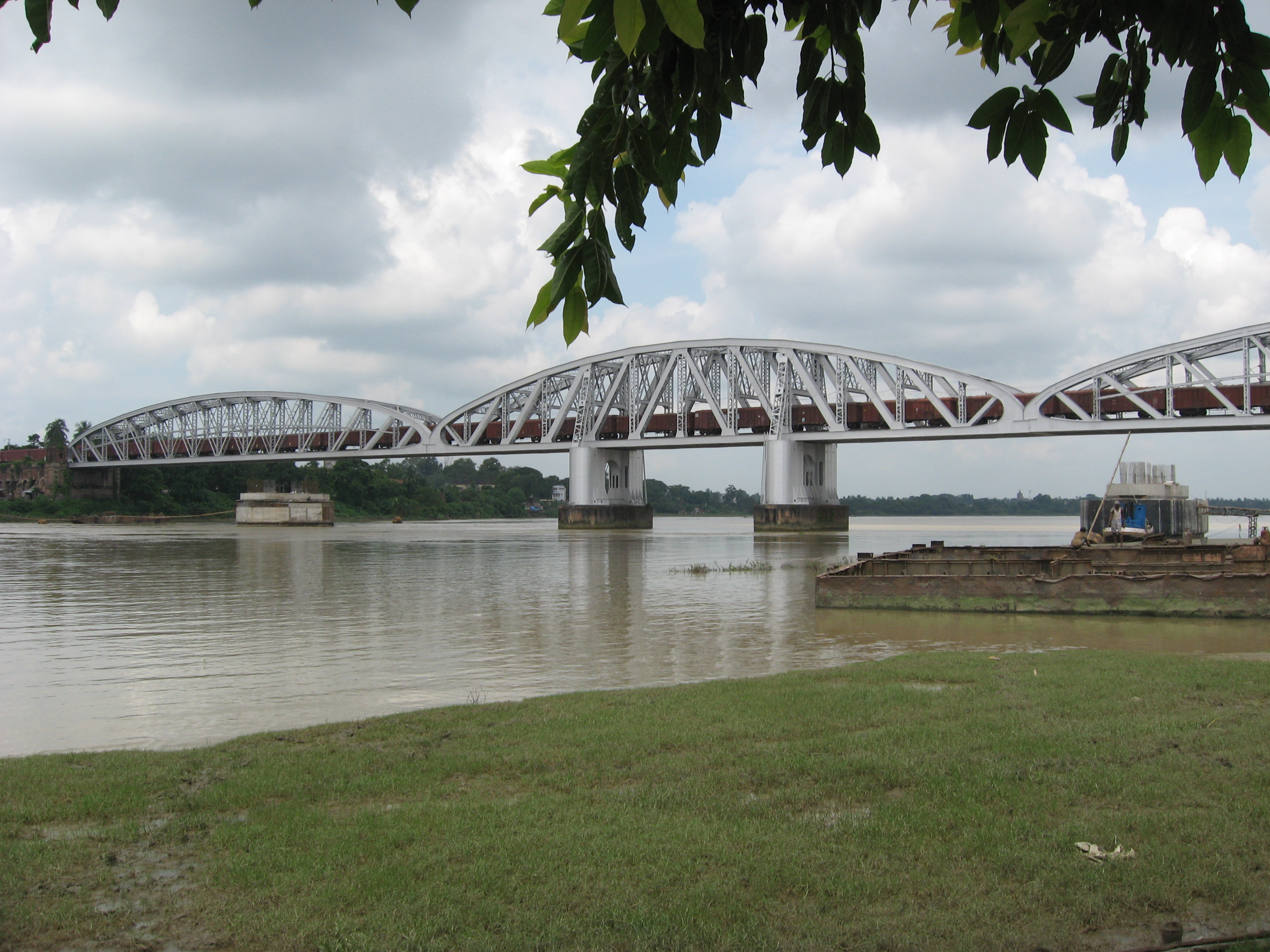
Jubilee Bridge

Sampreeti Bridge has replaced the old British-era Jubilee Bridge built in 1887. The new bridge is of 420-metre (1,378 ft) in length and is built across the Hooghly river at a cost of Rs. 207 crores.
