= Sampreeti Bridge =

Rail bridge in West Bengal, India

Sampreeti Setu
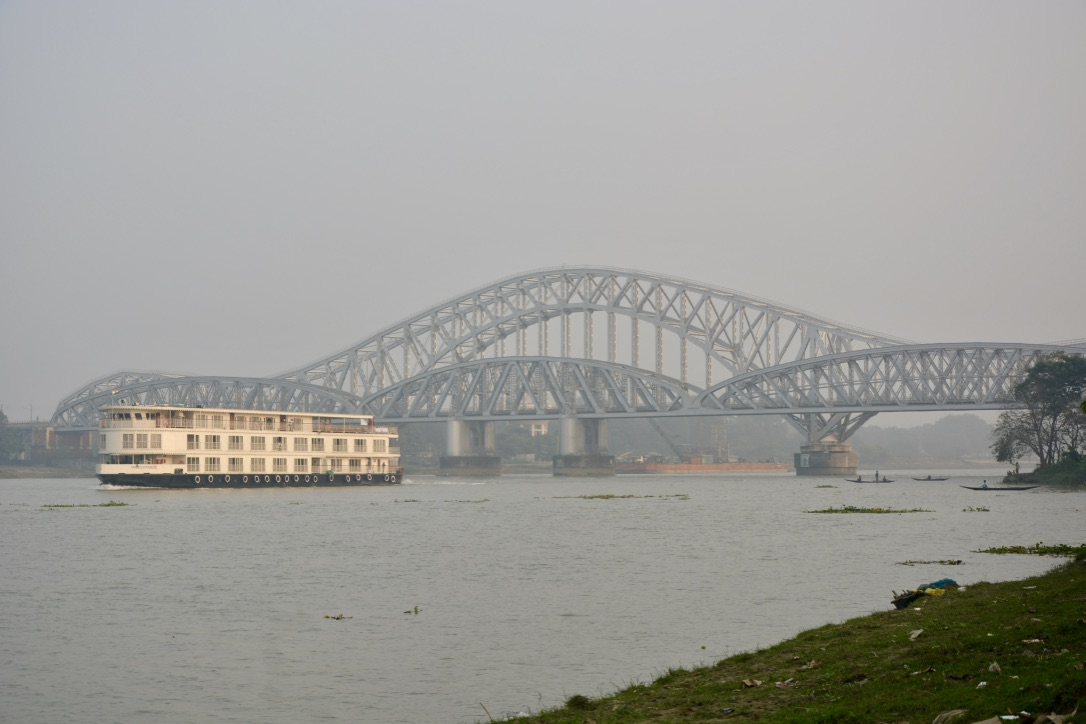
- Sampreeti Setu and Jubilee Bridge are seen at the same time
- Coordinates: 22°54′25″N 88°24′16″E
- Carries: Rail bridge
- Crosses: Hooghly River
- Official name: Sampreeti Setu
- Other name: New Jubilee Bridge

Characteristics
- Material: Concrete, steel
- Total length: 415 metres (1,362 ft)
- Width: 12 metres (39 ft)

History
- Construction end: 2016
- Opened: 2016

Location
- Interactive map of Sampreeti Setu

Sampreeti Setu or Sampreeti Bridge is a railway bridge on Hooghly River located near Hugli-Chuchura. This bridge was inaugurated on 17 April 2016. It is situated between Garifa railway station and Hooghly Ghat railway station in the Naihati-Bandel branch line. This bridge has been built as an alternative to the Jubilee Bridge (India). The bridge is 415 meters long.

== Construction history ==
In 2000, the Indian Railway minister took the project to build this bridge, but the project got clearance in 2003 and construction commenced thereafter. The foundation and substructure was constructed by Gammon India Limited and the work was completed in 2008. The bridge was constructed by Tantia Constructions Limited. The work on superstructure of bridge was started in 2010 by Eastern Railway under supervision of Mr. Ajeet Kumar, Chief Engineer of Eastern Railway. The bridge was Commissioned on 17 April 2016 after decommissioning of old Jubilee Bridge at the same time. The construction of new bridge faced several technical challenges, both in the design as well as construction. This is the first bridge of its kind in India in general and on Indian Railway in particular. Several expert civil engineers have contributed for development of concept, design and construction scheme of this unique bridge over river Hooghly. Contractor-Tantia Constructions Ltd.

== Construction properties ==
- Bridge length - 415 meters (1,033 ft)
- Material - Concrete and steel
- Type - Rail Bridge
- Lane - There are two railway tracks in parallel.
