= Jubilee Bridge (India) =

Bridge in India

Coordinates: 22°54′25.6″N 88°24′16.0″E

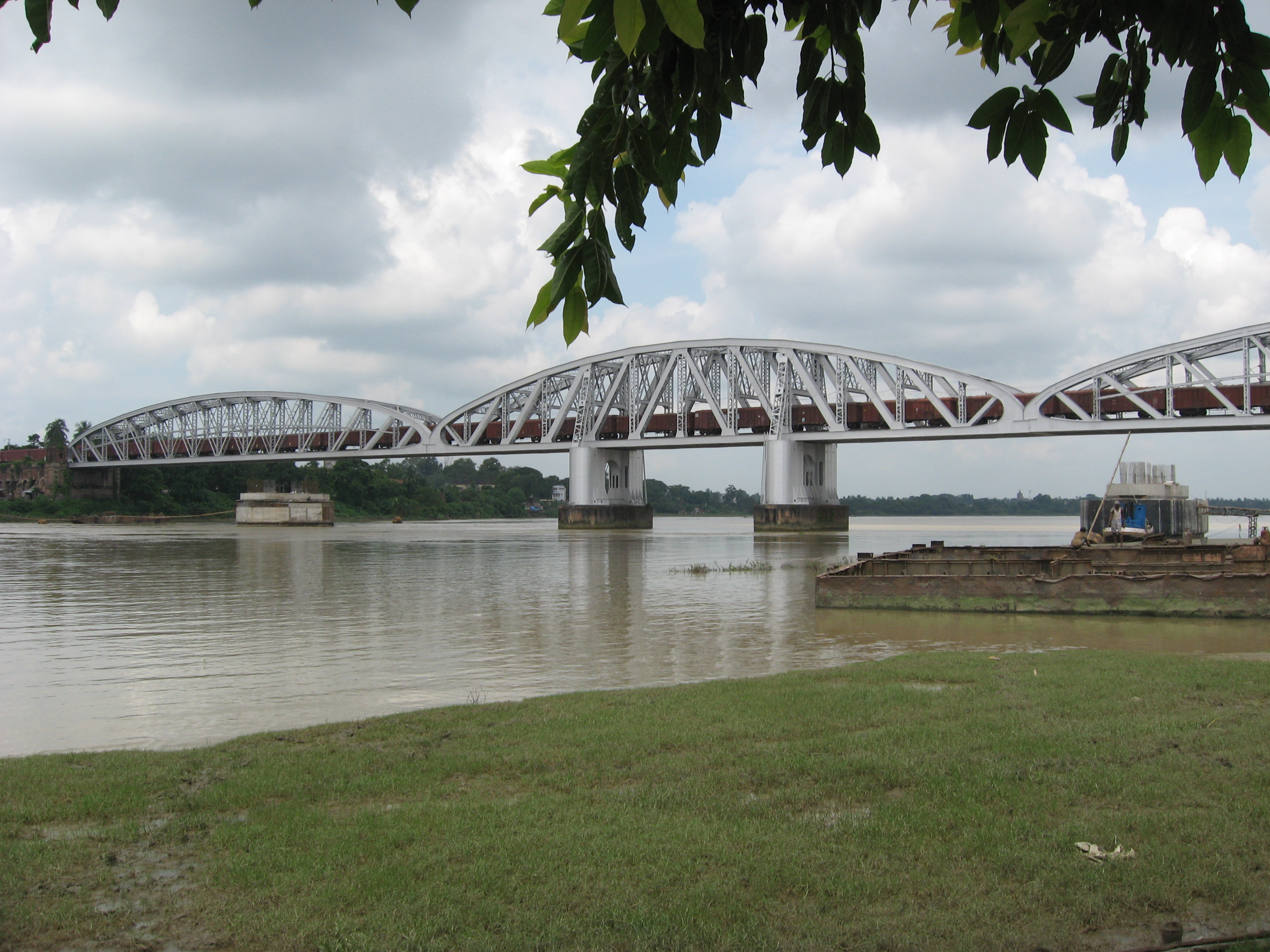
The Old (and now abandoned) Jubilee Bridge

The Jubilee Bridge (Bengali: জুবিলি ব্রিজ) is a former rail bridge over the Hooghly River between Naihati and Bandel in Kolkata, West Bengal, India. It provided an important connection between Garifa railway station and Hooghly Ghat railway station.

The Jubilee Bridge was opened on 16 February 1887 in the Golden Jubilee of Queen Victoria. Construction began in 1882 and was completed in 1887. The Chief Engineer in charge of construction works was Lt Col Arthur John Barry, nephew of Sir John Wolfe-Barry, project engineer of the London Tower Bridge. The Bridge was designed by Sir Bradford Leslie, Chief Engineer in India and Alexander Meadows Rendel. Its steel was manufactured by Hawks Crawshay of Gateshead in England and James Goodwin of Motherwell in Scotland. Bradford Leslie also designed the floating pontoon bridge across the Hooghly in Calcutta, which was replaced by the Howrah Bridge in 1942 and the Gorai River Railway Bridge near Kushtia in Bangladesh. He was the son of the American painter Charles Robert Leslie, ultimately Professor of Painting at the Royal Academy in London.

== Structure ==
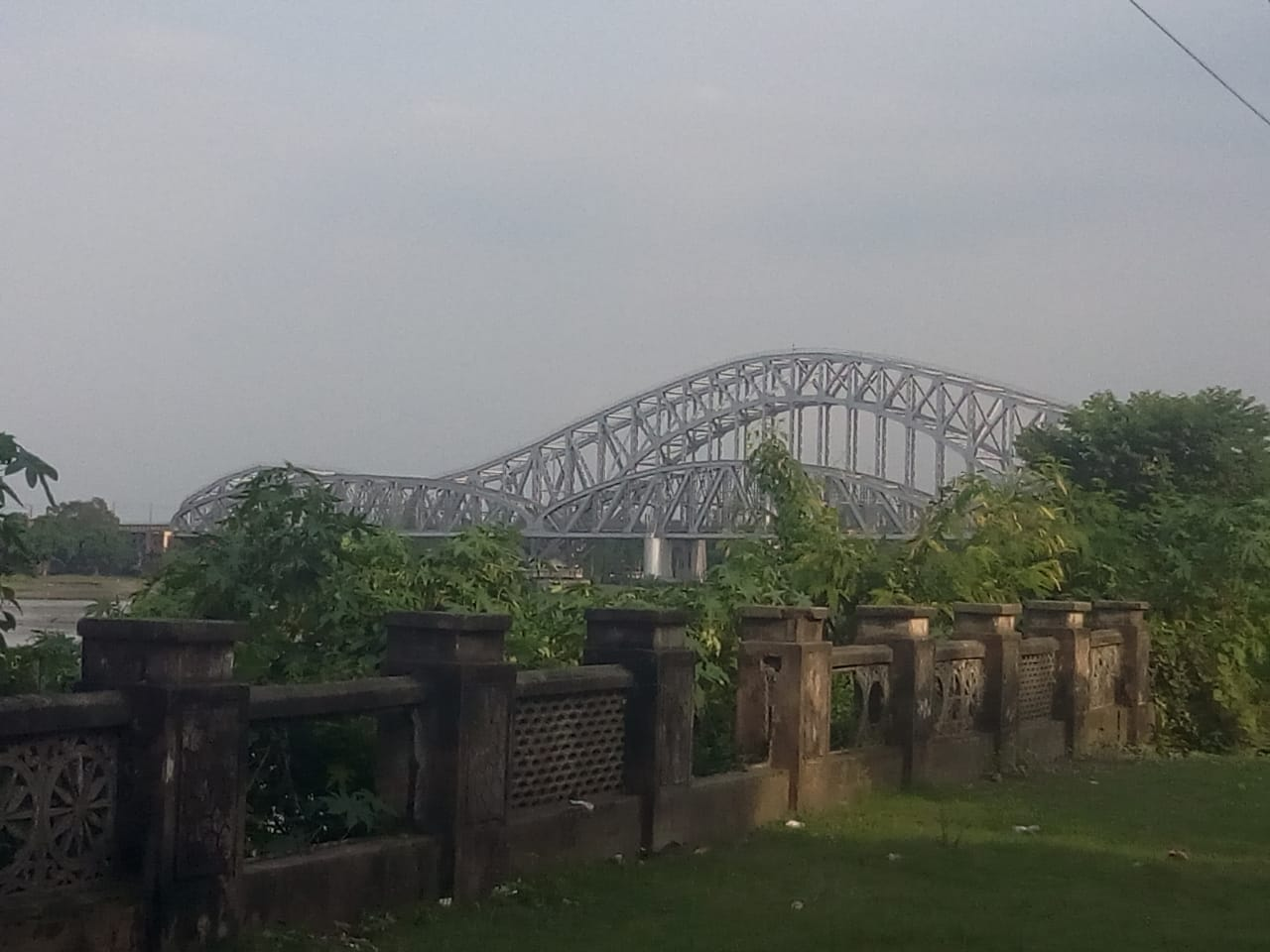
A view of Jubilee Bridge from the Hooghly Imambara complex

Jubilee Bridge was a 366 m (1,201 ft)-long, three‑span steel cantilever truss bridge that carried the Calcutta-Bandel railway across the Hooghly River between Naihati and Bandel. It was opened on 16 February 1885 after construction from 1882 to 1887. It comprised two 128.10 m (420.3 ft) side spans and a 109.95 m (360.7 ft) central cantilever span, all fabricated from Hawks Crawshay and James Goodwin steel and assembled entirely by riveting without nuts or bolts. The superstructure rested on iron‑caisson piers, each sunk 30 m (98 ft) below high‑water level and filled with brick and mortar, while brick‑masonry abutments tied to partly steel piers provided riverbank support. Unique cast‑iron pendulum bearings accommodated thermal expansion and dynamic loads, and an elevated deck profile kept the 11 m (36 ft) clearance above the highest flood levels, ensuring uninterrupted navigation and flood resilience throughout its 129 years of service.

== Replacement and retirement ==
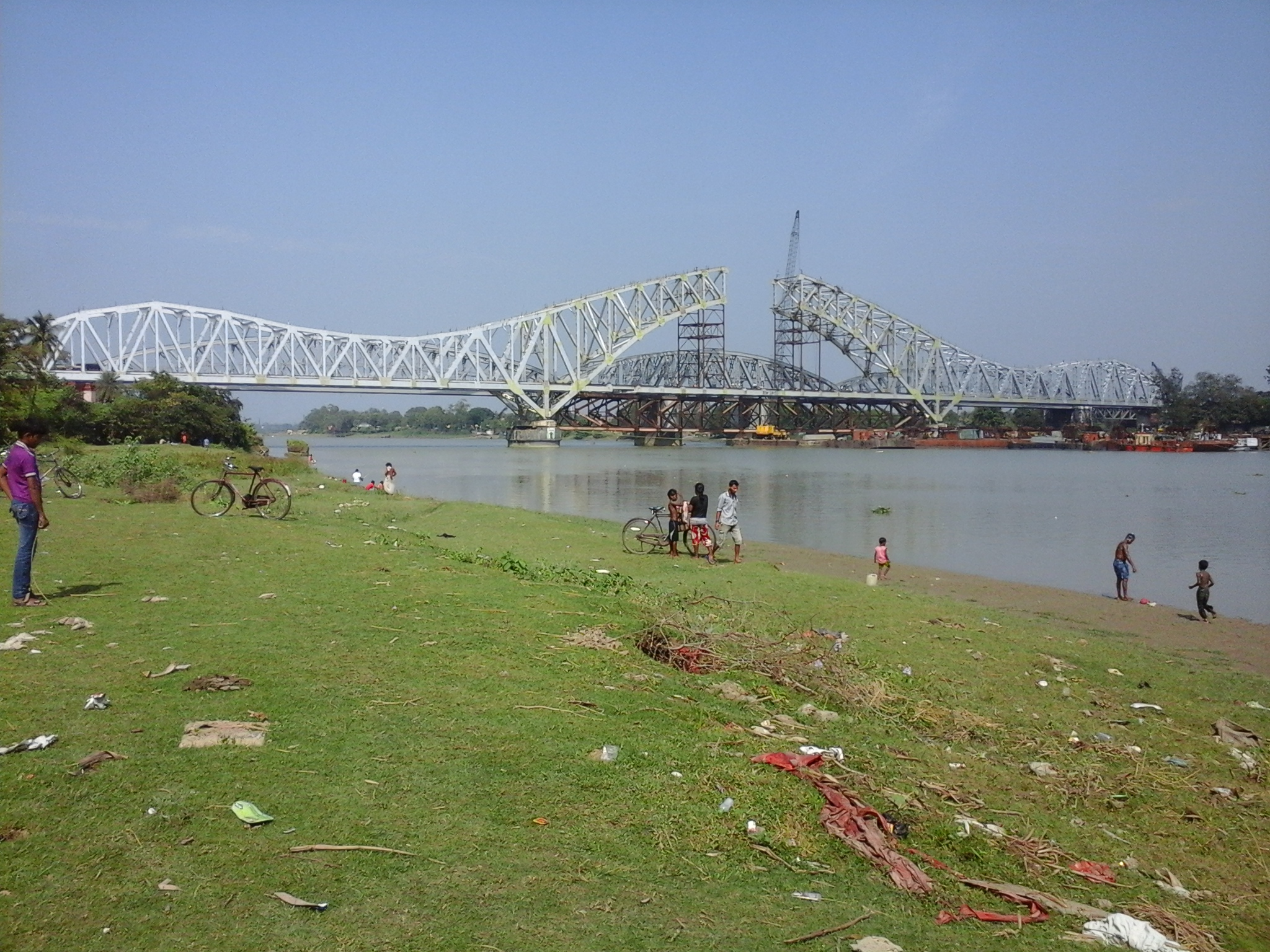
New Jubilee Bridge under construction in 2015

The Jubilee Bridge was decommissioned from service on 17 April 2016, the last train to pass through it being 13141/Teesta Torsha Express. At the same time rail traffic was diverted through Sampreeti Bridge, the new bridge between Bandel and Naihati sections of the Eastern Railway, that has been constructed beside the Jubilee Bridge.

Jubilee Bridge served the people for 129 years, and several generations used the service to cross the River Hooghly. The bridge has the distinction of being the first permanent crossing over the Hooghly, which had been considered unbridgeable owing to difficult foundation conditions at that time. The new bridge, Sampreeti Bridge, was inaugurated in 2016 after work started in around 2004. It is the first continuous truss bridge in India.
