= Arthur John Barry =

English civil engineer and architect

Arthur Barry
- Born: Arthur John Barry; 21 November 1859; Holborn, London, England
- Died: 1943 (aged 83–84)
- Occupations: Civil engineer and architect
- Spouse: Mabel Ostrehan (m. 1888)
- Parents: Charles Berry Jr. (father); Harriet May (mother)
- Relatives: The Barry Family

Lieutenant Colonel Arthur John Barry CBE TD MInstCE (21 November 1859 – 1943) was an English civil engineer and architect of the late 19th and early 20th century.

== Early life ==
Arthur John Barry was the fourth child of the architect Charles Barry, Jr. and his wife Harriet Gardiner Pitman May. He was born on 21 November 1859 at 5 Woburn Place, Russell Square, Holborn and baptised at St George's, Hart Street, Bloomsbury. He was educated at Uppingham School.

== Family ==
The Barry family was notable in the nineteenth century in the field of architecture and engineering. Barry's grandfather was the architect Sir Charles Barry, his father the architect Charles Barry, Jr. and his uncles the civil engineer Sir John Wolfe Barry and the architect Edward Middleton Barry. Arthur John Barry was the last generation of the dynasty. His most significant projects were in China, India, Thailand and Egypt.

He married Mabel Maude Josephine Ostrehan (born at Hyderabad, India on 15 July 1864) at St. Paul's Cathedral, Kolkata on 29 February 1888.

== Career ==
He was articled with his uncle Sir John and went to India in 1883.

At 24, in association with the chief engineer in India, Sir Bradford Leslie, he was chief engineer in charge of the construction of the Jubilee Bridge (India) over the Hooghley River between Naihati and Bandel which was completed in 1887. The bridge is noteworthy as a cantilever truss bridge, constructed entirely by riveting without the use of nuts or bolts in the construction.

He was the executive engineer in charge of the construction of the bridge over the Damuda River and the work of the Damuda district of the Bengal-Nagpur Railway, of which he was afterwards superintending engineer of the Bengal section.

He returned to England in 1891 and entered into partnership with his uncle Sir John Wolfe-Barry. In 1901 he entered into partnership with Sir Bradford Leslie as Barry and Leslie becoming in 1906 A.J.Barry and Partners.

In England, he was the Chief Engineer to the:

- Chipstead Valley Railway
- South Harrow Railway
- Crowhurst, Sidley and Bexhill Railway

He continued to work on international projects and was Joint Consulting Engineer in partnership with his uncle Sir John Wolfe-Barry to the:

- British and Chinese Corporation Limited
- Chinese Central Railway Limited
- Chinese Engineering and Mining Company Limited
- Shanghai Nanking Railway
- New Harbour and Port of Qinhuangdao on the Bohai Sea
- Bombay Port Trust
- Kowloon-Canton Railway

He was Consulting Engineer to the:

- Johore State Railway
- Southern Punjab Railway

and other projects in India, Thailand (Siam) and Egypt.

== Publications ==
- Arthur John Barry Lecture on the Great Siberian Railway: Delivered at the Military School of Engineering, Chatham, December 19, 1900 London (1900)
- Arthur John Barry Railway Expansion in China and the Influence of Foreign Powers in its Development, London (1910)
