= Garifa railway station =

Railway Station in West Bengal, India

Garifa
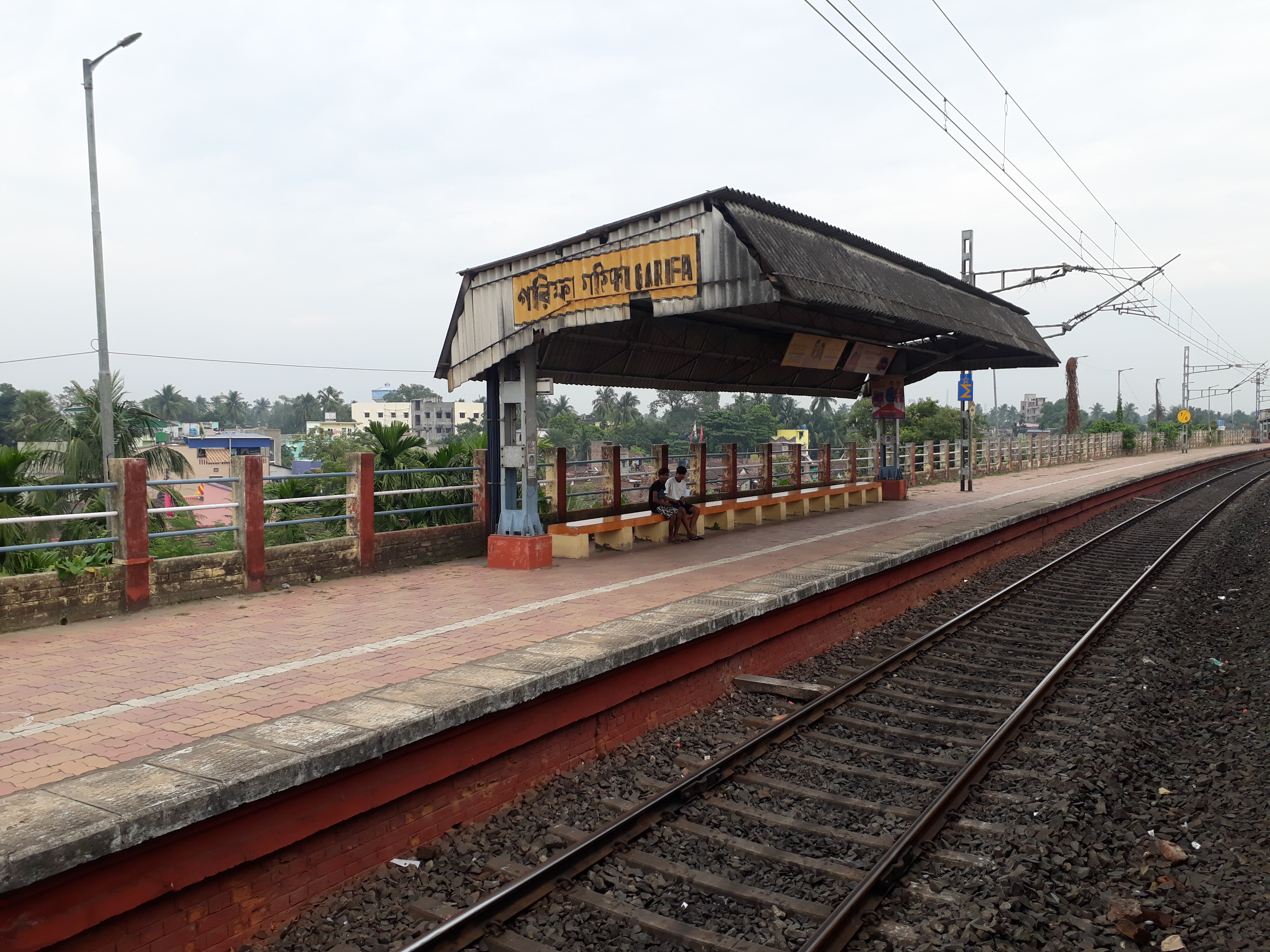

General information
- Location: Hazi Nagar, Ramghat, Garifa, North 24 Parganas district, West Bengal; India
- Coordinates: 22.908278°N 88.412747°E
- Elevation: 15 metres (49 ft)
- System: Kolkata Suburban Railway station
- Owner: Indian Railways
- Operator: Eastern Railway
- Line: Naihati–Bandel branch line
- Platforms: 2
- Tracks: 2 (double electrified BG)

Construction
- Structure type: Standard (on-ground station)
- Parking: No
- Cycle facilities: No

Other information
- Status: Functioning
- Station code: GFAE
- Zone(s): Eastern Railway
- Division(s): Howrah

Services
Preceding station	Kolkata Suburban Railway	Following station
Naihati Junction towards Sealdah	Eastern Line Naihati–Bandel line	Hooghly Ghat towards Barddhaman Junction
Route map
Location
- Location within West Bengal Location within India

Garifa railway station is a railway station on Naihati – Bandel Branch line of Howrah railway division of Eastern Railway zone. It is situated at Hazi Nagar, Ramghat, Garifa in North 24 Parganas district in the Indian state of West Bengal. Garifa is a connecting station of Sealdah main line and Howrah–Bardhaman main line through Sampreeti Bridge and Jubilee Bridge. Number of Passenger and Naihati Bandel EMU locals stop at Garifa railway station.
