= Bradford Leslie =

English civil engineer

Sir Bradford Leslie
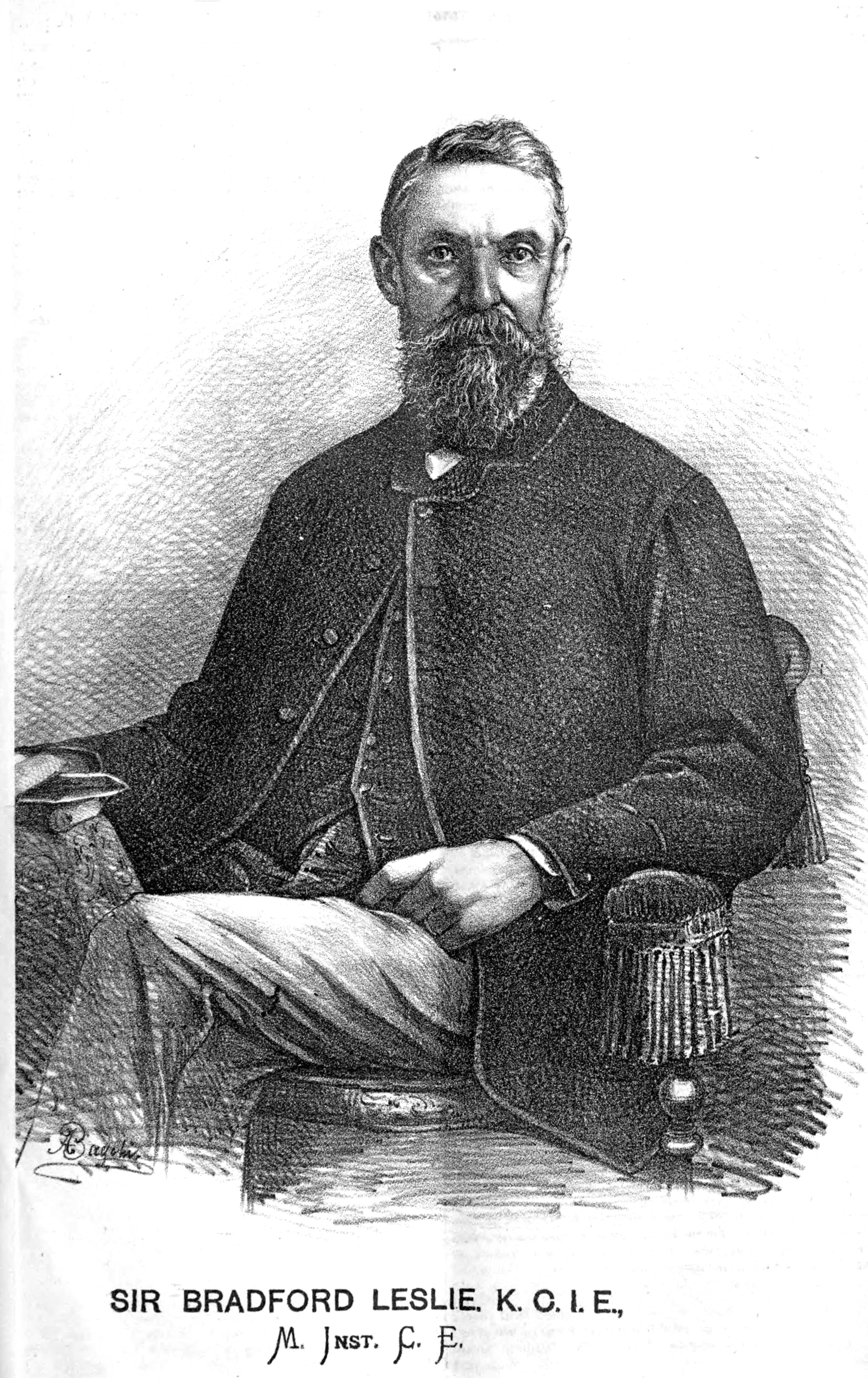
- Born: 18 March 1831; London, England
- Died: 21 March 1926 (aged 95); London, England
- Engineering career
- Discipline: Civil engineer Structural engineer
- Employer(s): Isambard Kingdom Brunel, Eastern Bengal Railway, East Indian Railway Company
- Projects: Jubilee Bridge

Sir Bradford Leslie KCIE (1831-1926) was an English civil engineer who specialised in bridges and was a pupil of Isambard Kingdom Brunel. His most notable achievement was the 1887 Jubilee Bridge.

== Early life ==
Leslie was born in London on 18 August 1831 the son of Charles Robert Leslie a noted painter and illustrator. His younger brother George was also later a painter and illustrator and his older brother Robert Leslie became a marine artist. Educated at the Mercers' School in London at the age of 16 Leslie was apprenticed to Isambard Kingdom Brunel, the usual fee of 1,000 guineas was waived in consideration of his father painting some pictures for Brunel. Leslie became a specialist at bridge building and in 1851 was assistant engineer on the Chepstow Bridge, his next position was resident engineer on the Saltash Bridge. Before the Saltash Bridge was completed he returned to London to undertake inspection of material for the steamship Great Eastern and at the launch of the ship he acted as an assistant to Brunel.

== India ==
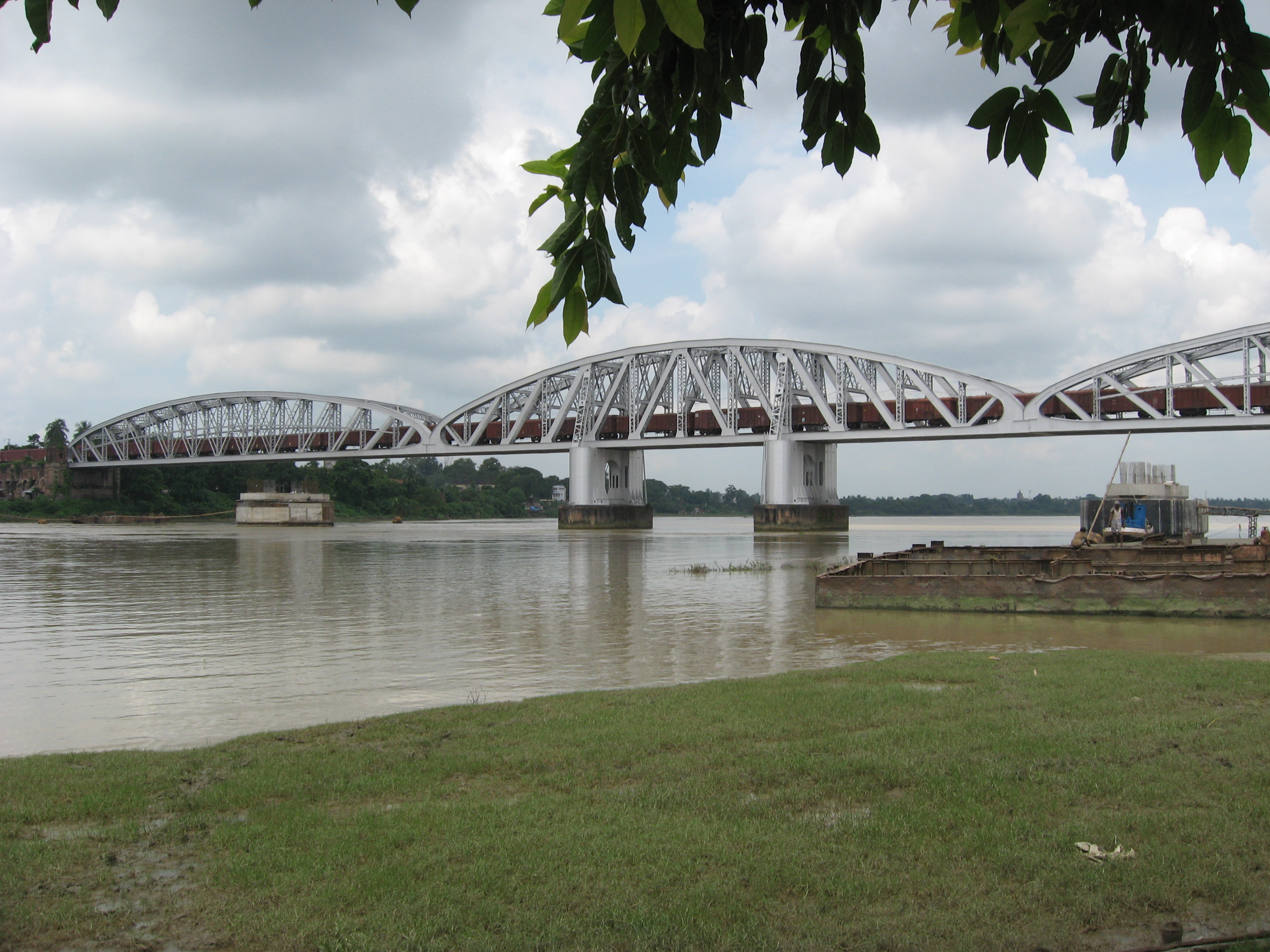
Jubilee Bridge 1887

Brunel was a consulting engineer to the Eastern Bengal Railway and Leslie was sent to India as engineer in charge of bridges and viaducts. He supervised the building of the Eschamutter and Koormar river bridges before returning to Britain in 1861 to design bridges for railway lines in South Wales. He soon returned to India as chief engineer of the Eastern Bengal Railway and in 1876 Leslie became agent and chief engineer to the East India Railway Company. His greatest achievement in India was the Hooghly Bridge (known as the Jubilee Bridge when it opened in 1887) for which he was appointed a Knight Commander Order of the Indian Empire. He also designed an unusual floating pontoon bridge which straddled the Hooghly in Calcutta for 70 years and the Gorai River railway bridge near Kushtia in Bangladesh.

== Later years ==
While in India Leslie lost his wife, three daughters and a son-in-law all within three years and after repeated attacks of malaria Leslie returned home to England with two orphan granddaughters in 1887. The ship Tasmania was wrecked off Corsica and while carrying one of his granddaughters to safety he fell and injured his knee, it was to trouble him for the rest of his life. The injury was not helped by an accident when he was 84 when he was knocked down by a bicycle as he left his London home and broke a thigh. Despite the injuries he continued to work and in 1895 he became the chairman of the Southern Punjab Railway Company in London. In 1899 he went on a brief return visit to India to discuss a replacement for his floating bridge which was now inadequate for the increased usage, in 1918 when he was 88 he submitted a new design. In 1901 he entered into partnership with Lt Col Arthur John Barry as Barry and Leslie. Barry had been the chief engineer in charge of the construction of the Jubilee Bridge.

He died at his London home on 21 March 1926 aged 95.
