= Hooghly Ghat railway station =

Railway station in West Bengal, India

Hooghly Ghat
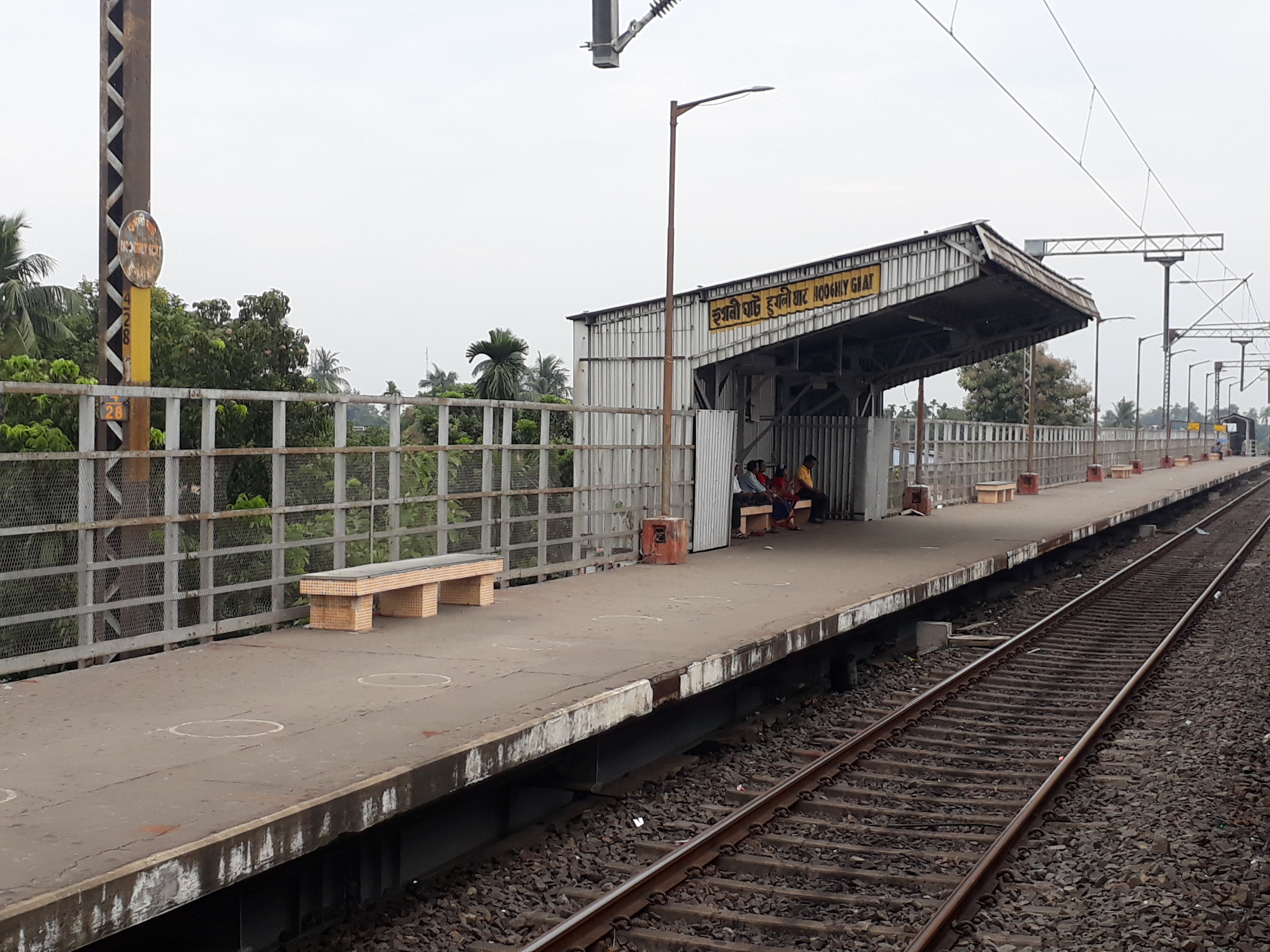
- Hooghly Ghat railway station

General information
- Location: Hooghly, Hooghly district, West Bengal; India
- Coordinates: 22.904839°N 88.396434°E
- Elevation: 17 metres (56 ft)
- System: Kolkata Suburban Railway station
- Owner: Indian Railways
- Operator: Eastern Railway
- Platforms: 2
- Tracks: 2 (double electrified broad gauge)
- Connections: Auto stand

Construction
- Structure type: Standard (on-ground station)
- Parking: No
- Cycle facilities: No

Other information
- Status: Functioning
- Station code: HYG
- Zone(s): Eastern Railway
- Division(s): Howrah

Services
Preceding station	Kolkata Suburban Railway	Following station
Garifa towards Sealdah	Eastern Line Naihati–Bandel line	Bandel Junction towards Barddhaman Junction
Route map
Location
- Location within West Bengal Location within India

Hooghly Ghat railway station is a small railway station in Hooghly district in the state of West Bengal. It is situated in the Naihati - Bandel Branch line. Its code is HYG. It serves Hooghly city. The station consists of two platforms, neither of which are well sheltered. It is raised on an elevated platform connecting the districts of Hooghly and Nadia via the Sampriti Bridge or Jubilee Bridge in the earlier years. It lacks water drinking stations and basic sanitation requirements.

== Major trains ==
- Muzaffarpur–Sealdah Fast Passenger (unreserved)
- Sealdah–Rampurhat Passenger (unreserved)
- Naihati–Bandel EMU locals
