= Hooghly River =

Distributary of the Ganges River in India

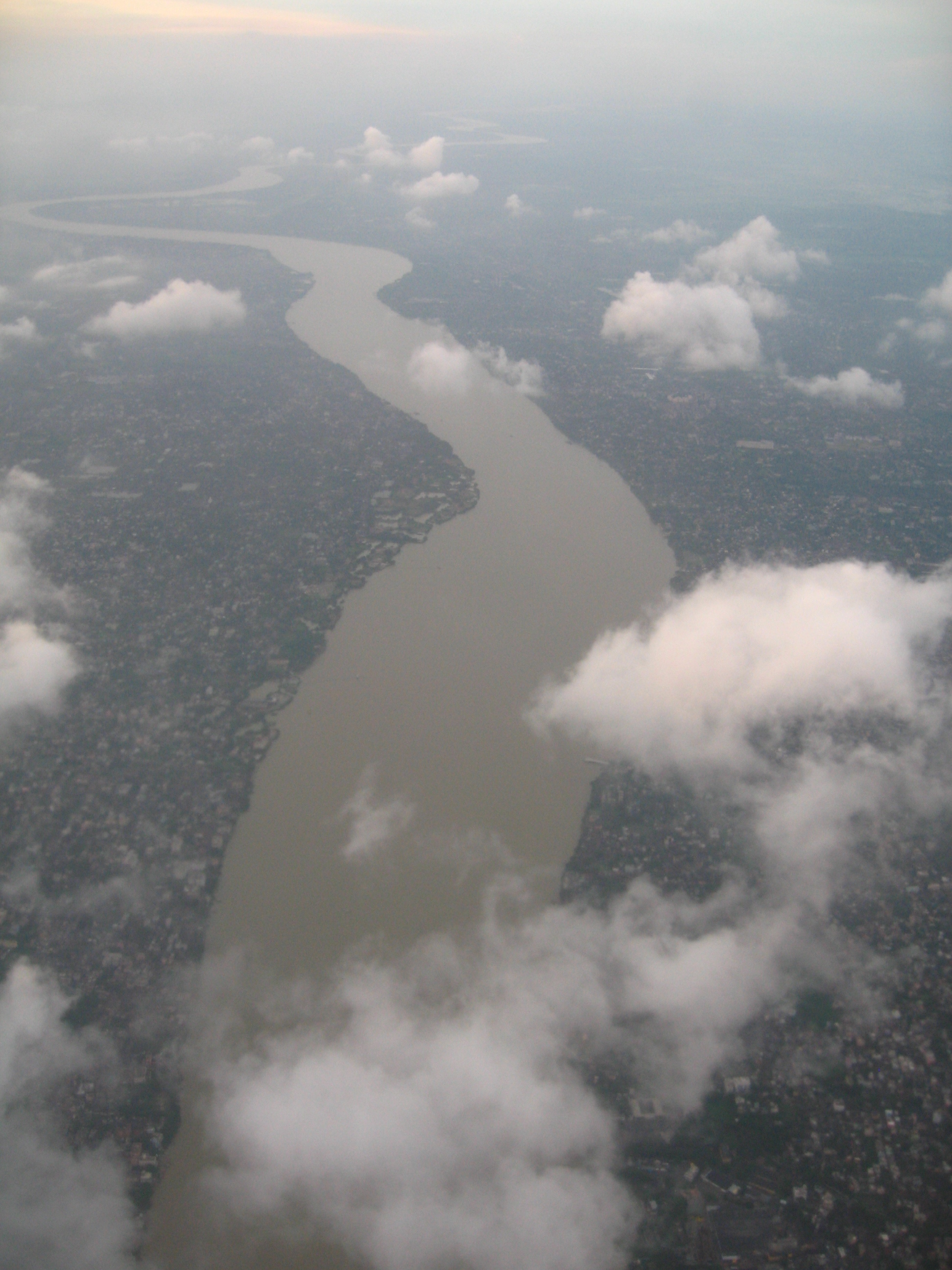
- The Hooghly flowing through Bally

Location
- Country: India
- State: West Bengal

Physical characteristics
- Source: Ganges
  - coordinates: 24°30′18″N 88°05′05″E
- Mouth: Bay of Bengal
  - coordinates: 21°40′50″N 87°57′23″E
- Length: 260 kilometres
- Depth
  - maximum: 117 m

Basin features
- Bridges: Vidyasagar Setu (Second Hooghly Bridge); Rabindra Setu (Howrah Bridge); Nivedita Setu; Vivekananda Setu (Bally bridge); Sampreeti Bridge; Jubilee Bridge; Ishwar Gupta Setu; Gourango Setu; Nashipur Rail Bridge; Ramendra Sundar Tribedi Setu; Jangipur Bhagirathi Bridge

The Hooghly River (/ˈhuːɡli/; Bengali: Hugli [ˈɦuɡli]) is the westernmost distributary of the Ganges, situated in West Bengal, India. It is known in its upper reaches as the Bhagirathi. The Bhagirathi splits off from the main branch of the Ganges at Giria. A short distance west, it meets the man-made Farakka Feeder Canal, which massively increases its flow. The river then flows south to join the Jalangi at Nabadwip, where it becomes the Hooghly proper. The Hooghly continues southwards, passing through the metropolis of Kolkata. Thereafter, it empties into the Bay of Bengal. Its tributaries include the Ajay, Damodar, Rupnarayan, and Haldi.

The Hooghly has religious significance as Hindus consider the river sacred. It also plays a major role in the agriculture, industry, and climate of the state.

== Course ==
The vast majority of the water that flows into the Hooghly River is provided by the man-made Farakka Feeder Canal, rather than the natural source of the river at Giria. The Farakka Barrage is a dam that diverts water from the Ganges into the Farakka Feeder Canal near the town of Tildanga in Murshidabad district, located 40 km upstream from Giria. This supplies the Hooghly with water as per the agreement between India and Bangladesh. The feeder canal runs parallel to the Ganges, past Dhulian, until just above Jahangirpur where the canal ends and joins the Bhagirathi river. The Bhagirathi then flows south past Jiaganj Azimganj, Murshidabad and Baharampur.

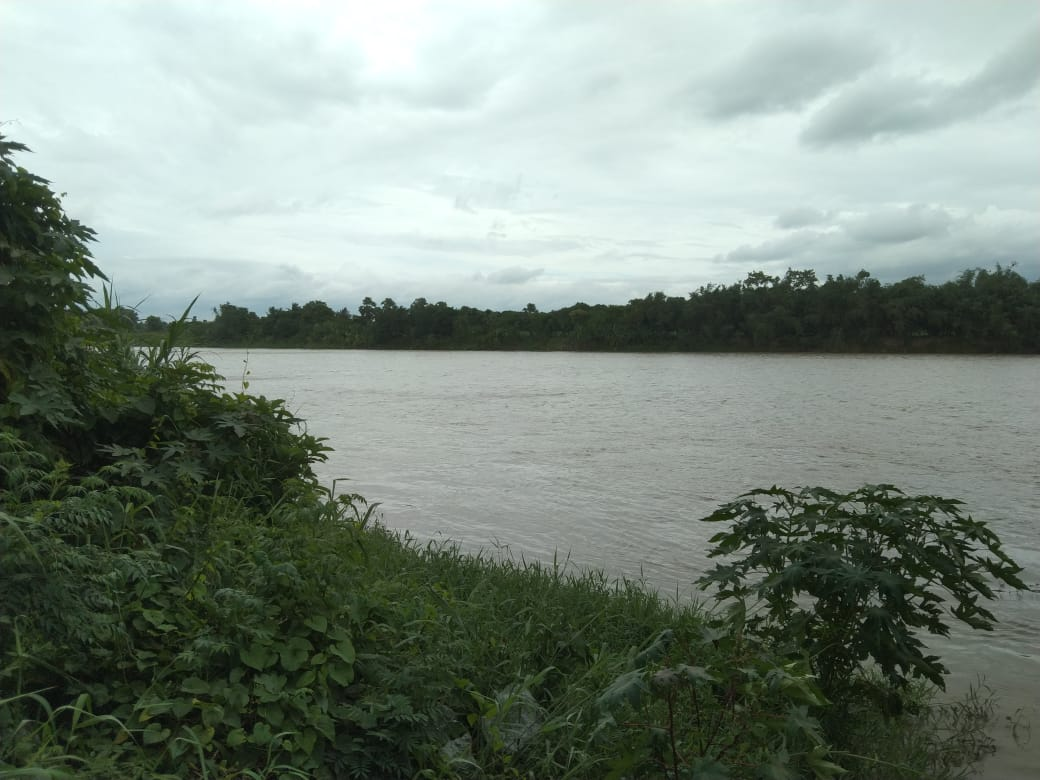
Bhagirathi River, Murshidabad

South of Baharampur and north of Palashi it used to form the border between Bardhaman District and Nadia District, but while the border has remained the same the river is now often east or west of its former bed. The river then flows south past Katwa, Nabadwip, Kalna and Jirat. At Kalna it originally formed the border between Nadia District and Hooghly District, and then further south between Hooghly District and North 24 Parganas District. It flows past Halisahar, Chinsurah, Naihati, Bhatpara, Konnagar, Serampore, and Kamarhati. Then, just before entering the twin cities of Kolkata (Calcutta) and Howrah, it turns to the southwest. At Nurpur it enters an old channel of the Ganges, and turns south to empty into the Bay of Bengal through an estuary about 20 mi (32 km) wide [2].

Ain-i-Akbari, a book by Abu'l-Fazl, describes that the river Ganga and river Sarwasati (Sarsuti) streams of lower Bengal had different flows. According to the footnotes of this book, the colour of the water of the Sarawasati was white, the colour of another stream named Jamuna was blue, and the colour of the Ganga was muddy and yellowish. From Kolkata the main flow of the Hooghly-Bhagirathi (or Ganga) used to run along the side of the Kalighat temple, Baruipur, Jaynagar Majilpur, Chhatrabhog and Hatiagarh. At that time, between Khiderpore and Sankrail no flow existed. Presently, the stream between Khiderpore and Sankrail became known as KatiGanga. A channel had been dug at the time of Alibardi Khan in the middle of the 18th century. This happened with the assistance of Dutch traders, who also set up a toll point on the Hooghly river. So the present reach of the Hooghly is the lower part of the historical Saraswati. Kolkata the capital of West Bengal is located on the banks of the Hoogly river.

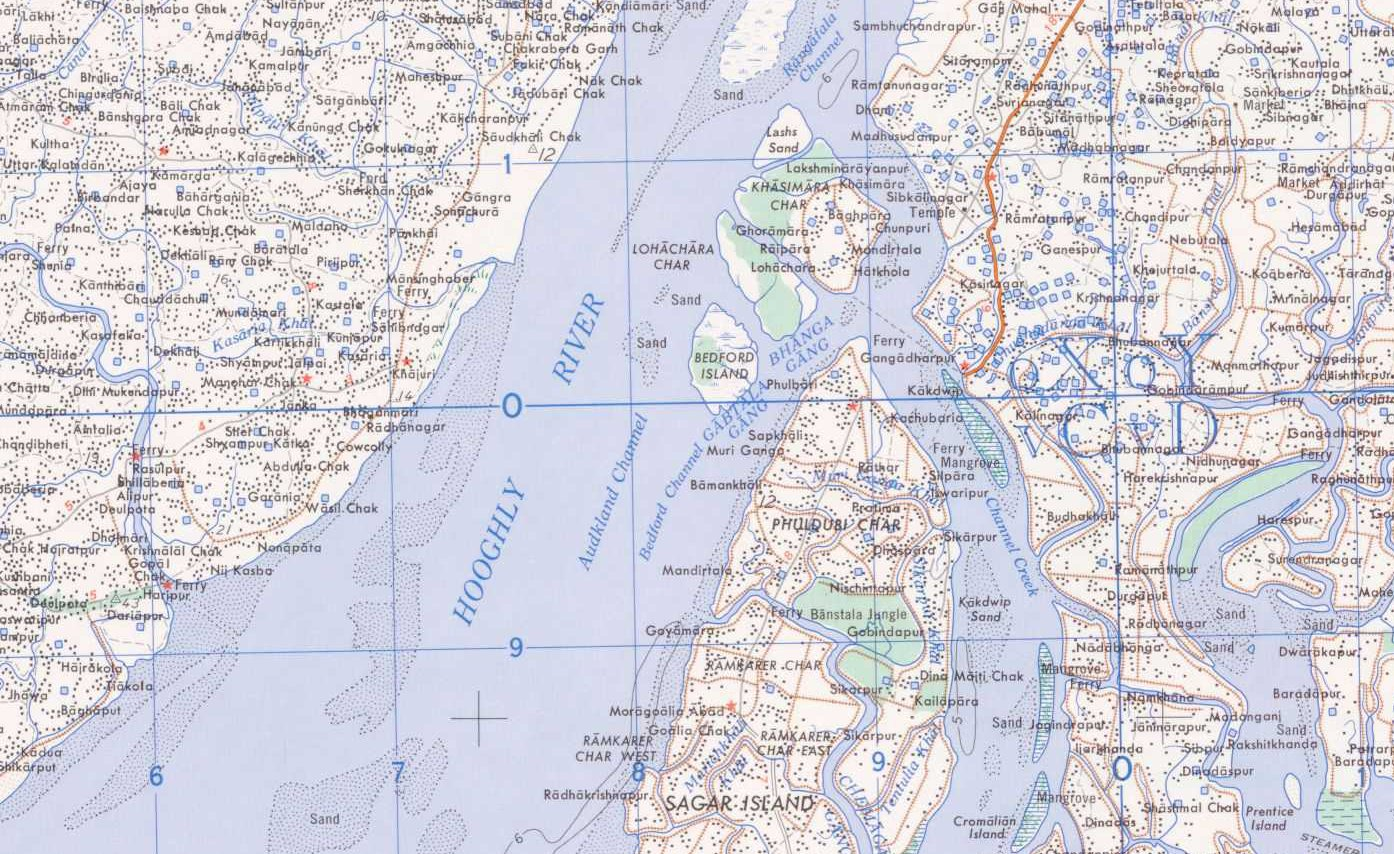
Map of the Hooghly River delta showing Sagar Island

== Tidal bore ==
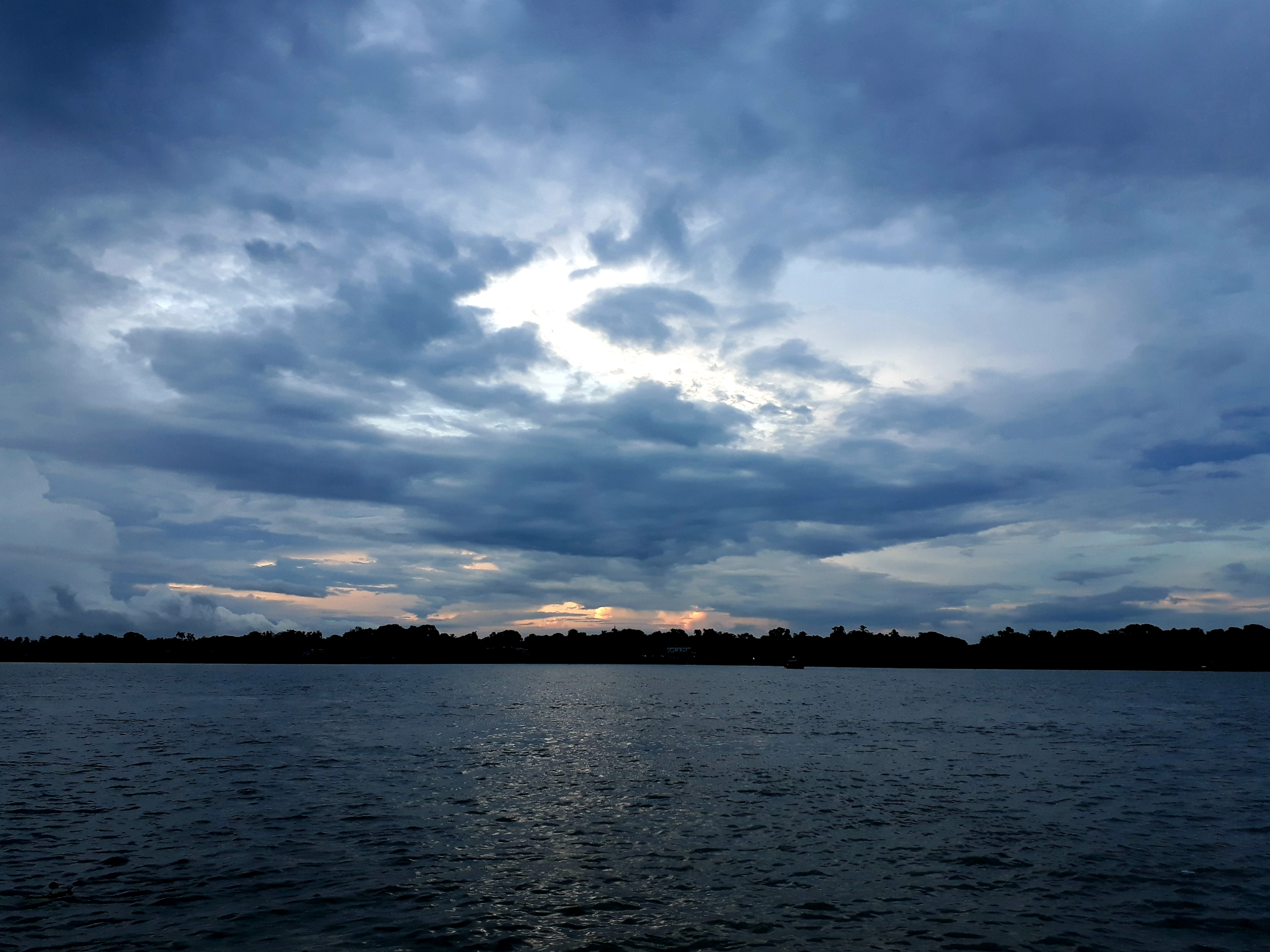
Hooghly River, Serampore

The tide runs rapidly on the Hooghly, and produces a remarkable example of the fluvial phenomenon known as a tidal bore. This consists of the head-wave of the advancing tide, hemmed in where the estuary narrows suddenly into the river, and often exceeds 7 ft (2.1 m) in height. It is felt as high up as Naihati 35 km upstream of Calcutta, and frequently destroys small boats. A tidal bore which overcame the banks of the river in 1876 was reported to have killed up to a hundred thousand people. The difference from the lowest point of low-water in the dry season to the highest point of high-water in the rains is reported to be 20 ft 10 in (6.35 m). The greatest mean rise of tide, about 16 ft (4.9 m), takes place in March, April or May - with a declining range during the rainy season to a mean of 10 ft (3.0 m), and a minimum during freshets of 3 ft 6 in (1.07 m).

== History ==
In its upper reaches the river is generally known as the Bhāgirathi, until it reaches Hooghly. The word Bhāgirathi literally means "caused by Bhagiratha", a Hindu mythological Solar dynasty prince who was instrumental in bringing the river Ganges from heaven to the earth, in order to release his 60,000 grand-uncles from a curse of the saint Kapila.

In 1974, the Farakka Barrage began diverting water into the Hooghly during the dry season so as to reduce the silting difficulties at Kolkata's port.

Like the rest of the Ganges, the Bhāgirathi-Hooghly is considered sacred to Hindus, and its water is considered holy.

== Bridges and tunnels ==
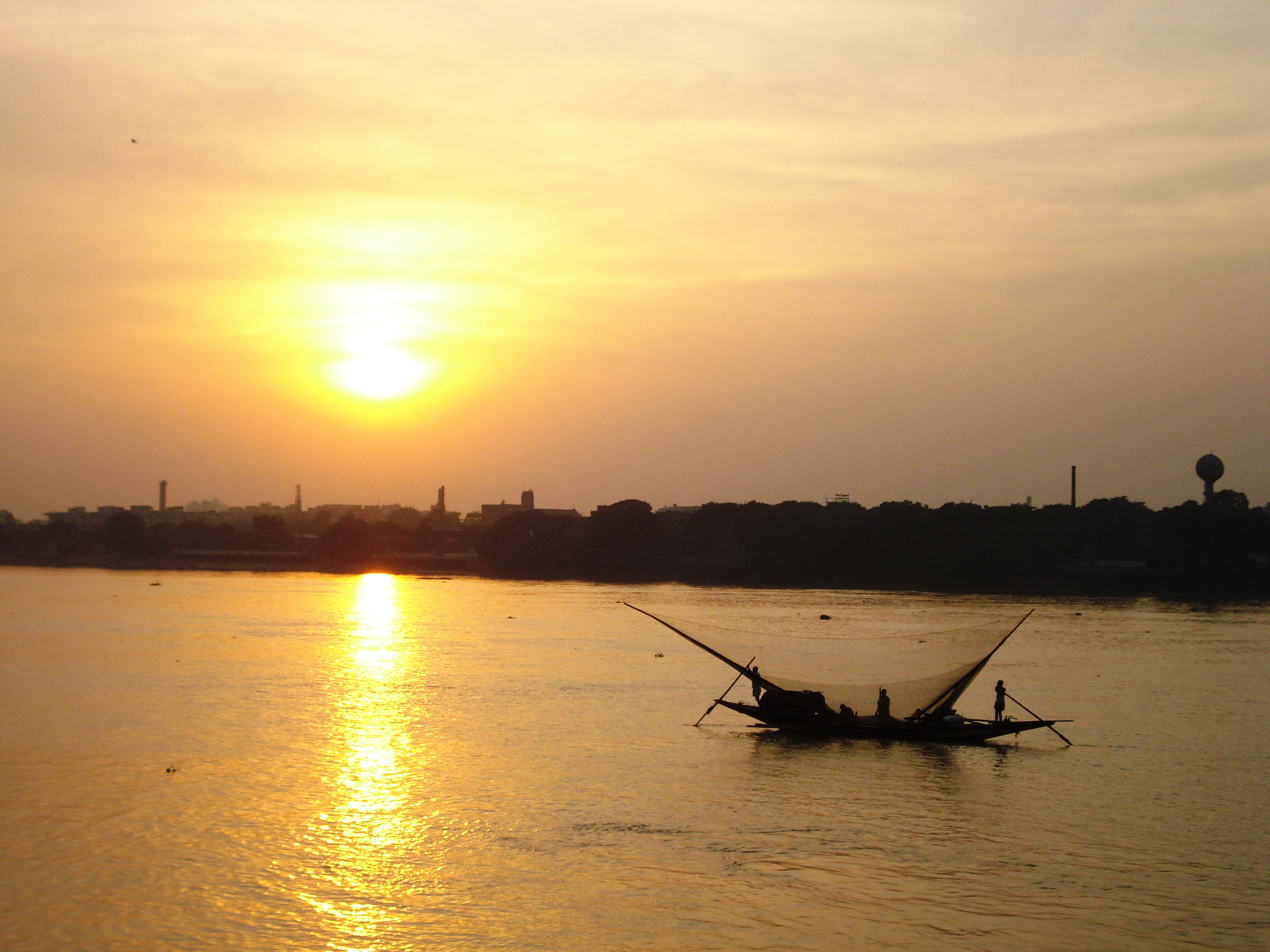
Sunset at River Hooghly, Kolkata, West Bengal, India

The following bridges currently span the Hooghly River; listed from south to north until the Farakka Feeder Canal meets the river:

- Vidyasagar Setu (Second Hooghly Bridge)- inaugurated in October 1992, connecting Howrah and Kolkata
- Rabindra Setu (Howrah Bridge) - inaugurated in February 1943, connecting Howrah and Kolkata
- Nivedita Setu (Second Vivekananda Bridge) - inaugurated in July 2007, connecting Bally and Dakhineswar; runs adjacent to Vivekananda Setu
- Vivekananda Setu (Bally Bridge; road and rail bridge) - inaugurated in December 1932, connecting Bally and Dakhineswar; runs adjacent to Nivedita Setu
- Sampreeti Setu (New Jubilee Bridge; rail only) - inaugurated in August 2016, connecting Bandel and Naihati; replaced the now-decommissioned Jubilee Bridge
- Ishwar Gupta Setu (Kalyani Bridge) - inaugurated in 1989, connecting Bansberia and Kalyani
- Gouranga Setu - connecting Nabadwip and Krishnanagar
- Ramendra Sundar Tribedi Setu - connecting Khagraghat and Baharampur
- Jangipur Bhagirathi Bridge - connecting Raghunathganj and Jangipur

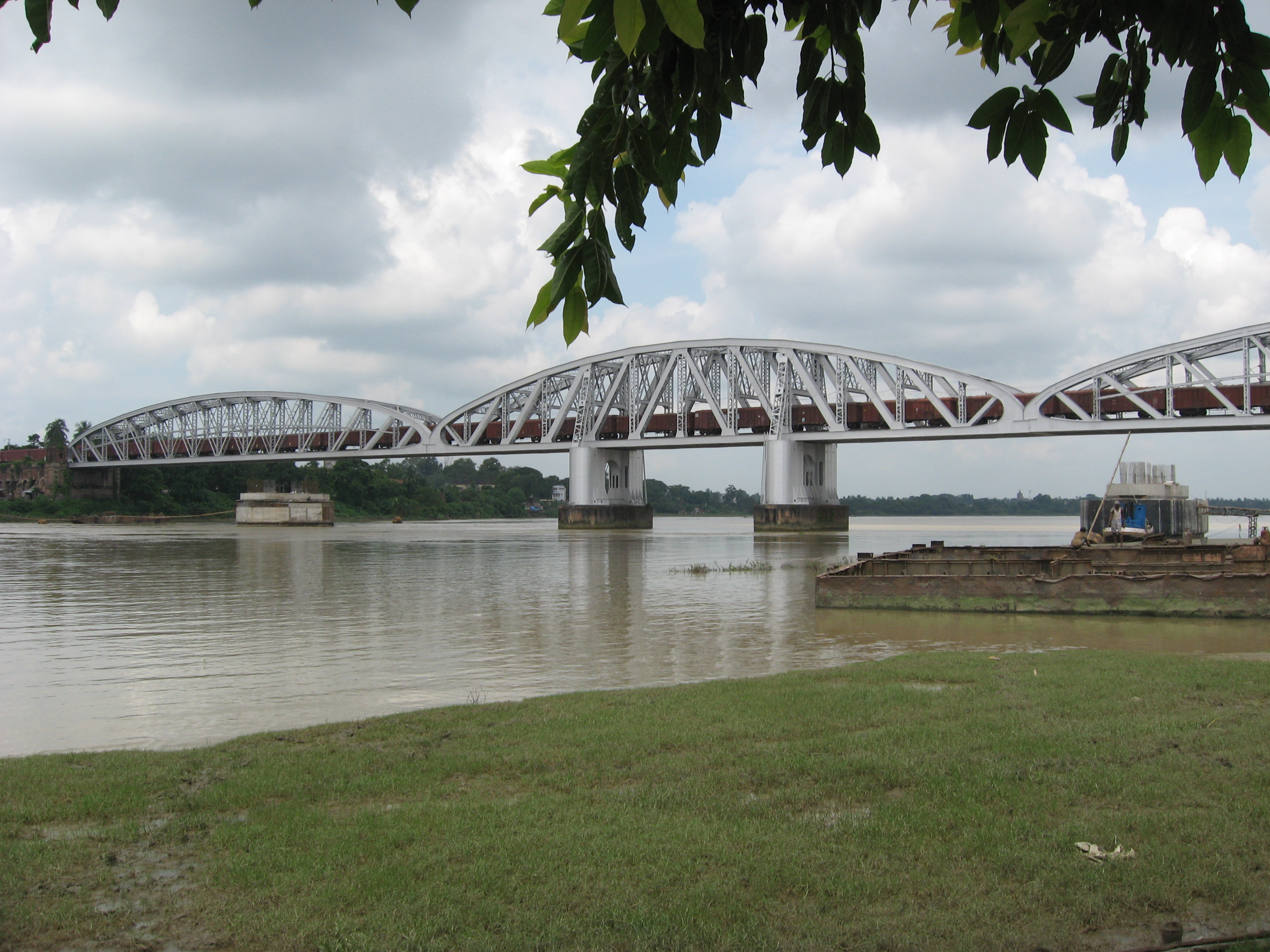
Jubilee Bridge on Hooghly River between Naihati and Bandel

The following bridges are under various stages of development:

- Nashipur Rail Bridge (rail only) - partially constructed; connecting Azimganj and Murshidabad
- New Bhagirathi Bridge - constructed on NH 34 at Berhampore
- Kalna - Shantipur Bridge - announced
- Fuleshwar - Budge Budge Bridge - announced

The following tunnels are situated under the Hooghly River :-

- CESC Tunnel - This tunnel is using for electric power transmission between Kolkata and Howrah. It was the first underwater tunnel of Asia. The construction of this tunnel was completed in 1931.

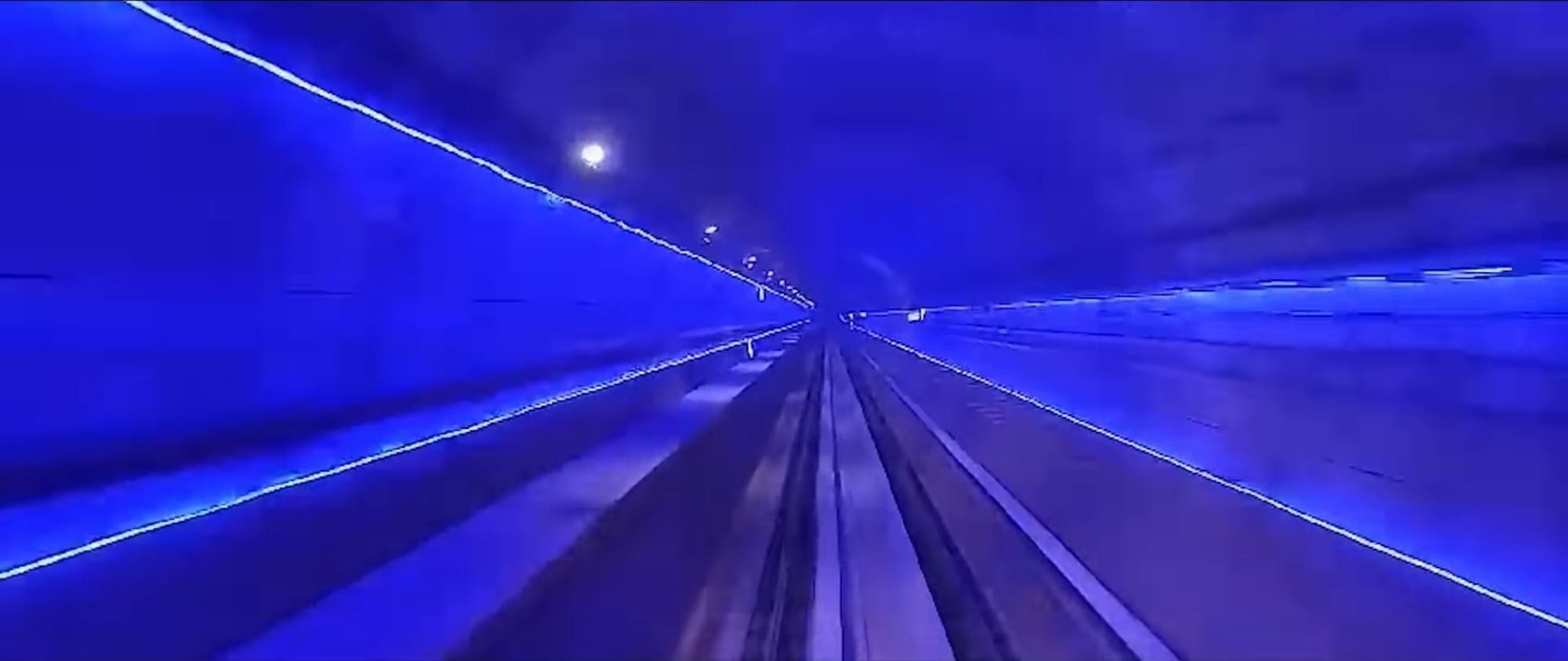
Hooghly River Underwater metro tunnel segment

East west metro tunnel underwater section

- East West Metro Tunnel - The tunnel was completed in 2021. This tunnel is the first underwater river railway tunnel in India. It is a metro railway tunnel, connecting Kolkata to Howrah.

== Economics ==
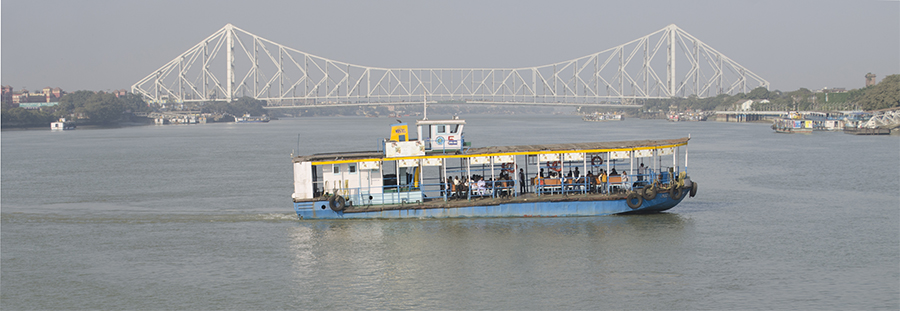
A ferry operating between Howrah and Kolkata with Howrah Bridge (Rabindra Setu) in background

The Bhāgirathi-Hooghly river system is an essential lifeline for the people of West Bengal. It was through this river that the East India company sailed into Bengal and established their trade settlement, Calcutta, the capital of British India. People from other countries such as the French, Dutch, Portuguese, etc. all had their trade settlements by the banks of this river.

The river provides a perennial supply of water to the plain of West Bengal for irrigation and human & industry consumption. The river is navigable and a major transport system in the region with a large traffic flow. For a long time, the Calcutta Port was the biggest port of India. Although in the past its significance had gone down, recently it has reached the 3rd position in the list of Indian Ports. The modern container port of Haldia, on the intersection of lower Hooghly and Haldi River, now carries much of the region's maritime trade. One new port will be built in the deep sea to reduce the load on Calcutta port.

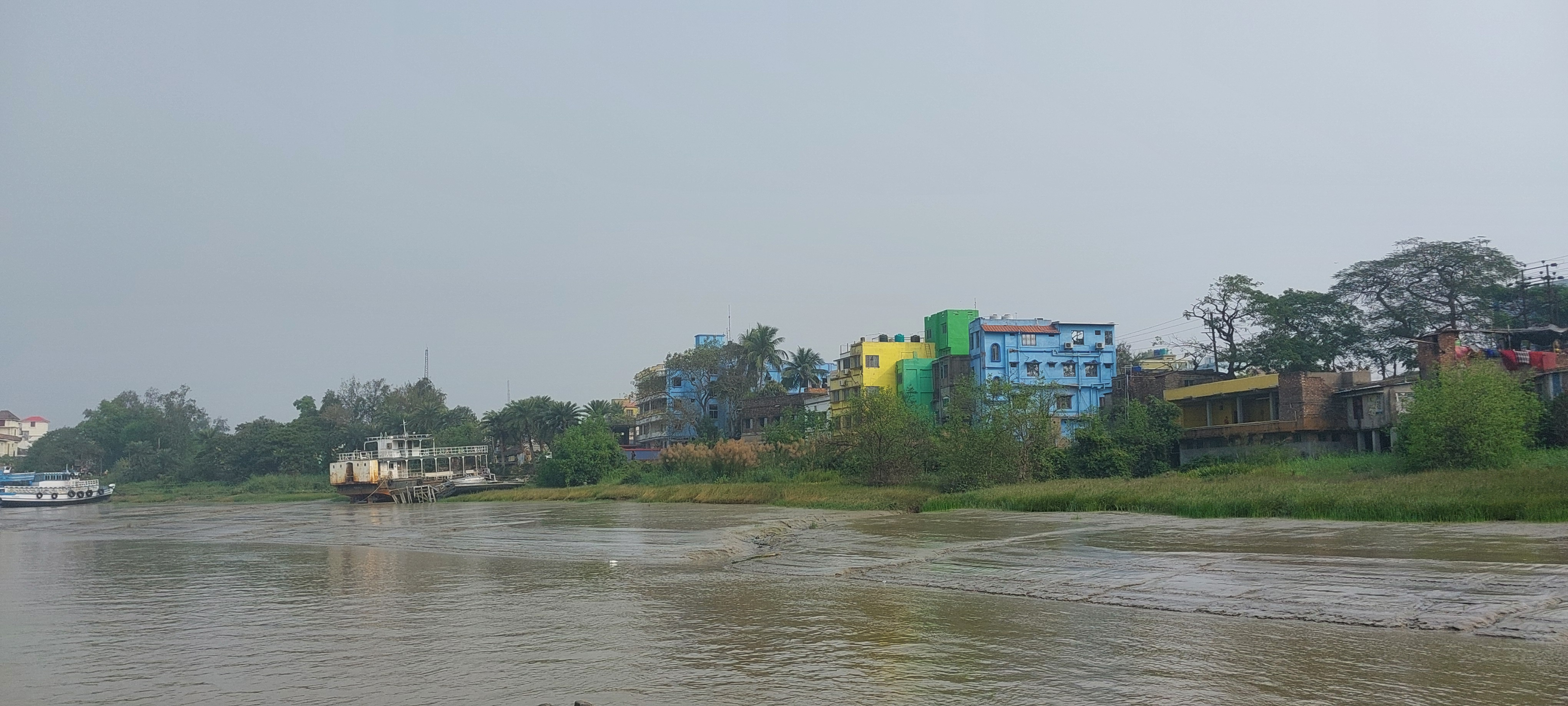
Hooghly River at Diamond Harbour

Despite the river being polluted, the fish from it are important to the local economy.

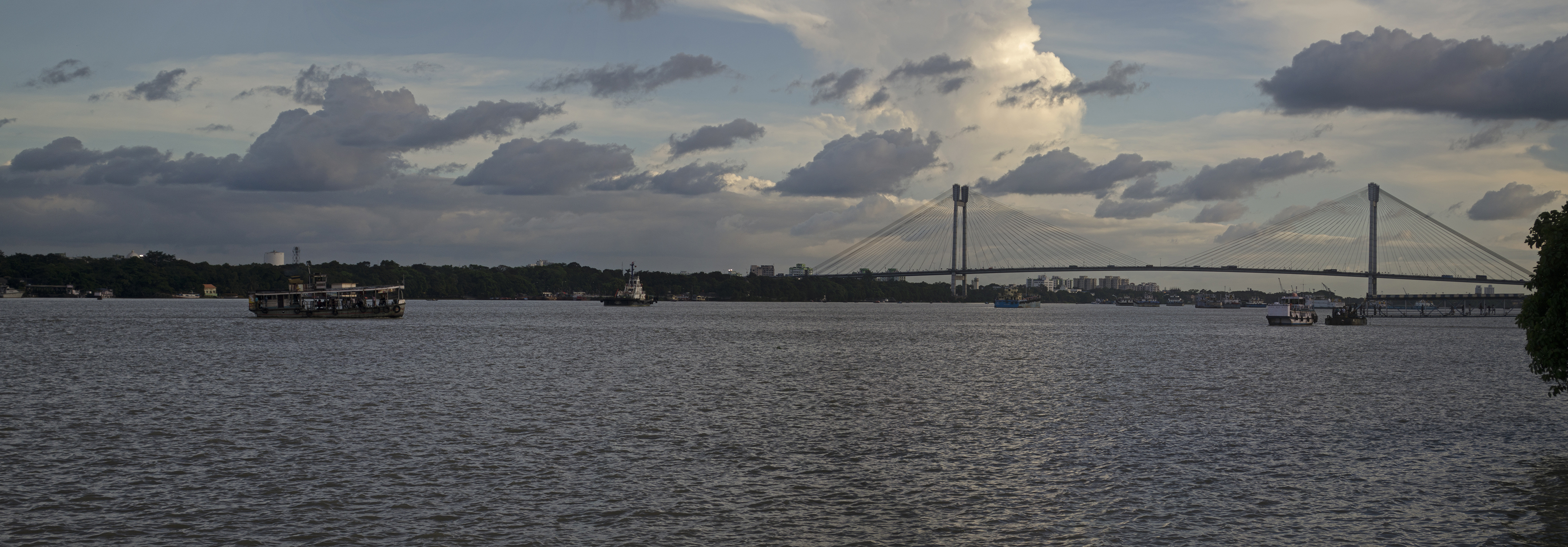
Panoramic view of Kolkata from Howrah with Second Hooghly Bridge

The Hooghly river valley was the most important industrial area of the state of Bengal. Despite a decline of the jute industry, the prime industry of this region, it is still one of the biggest industrial areas of India. It has a number of small cities which form the Greater Kolkata agglomeration, the second biggest Indian city and the former capital.

In September 2015, the Government of West Bengal announced that renovation of the Hooghly riverfront in Kolkata will be completed with the help of World Bank funding under the National Ganga River Basin Project Scheme.

== Hooghly River in arts ==
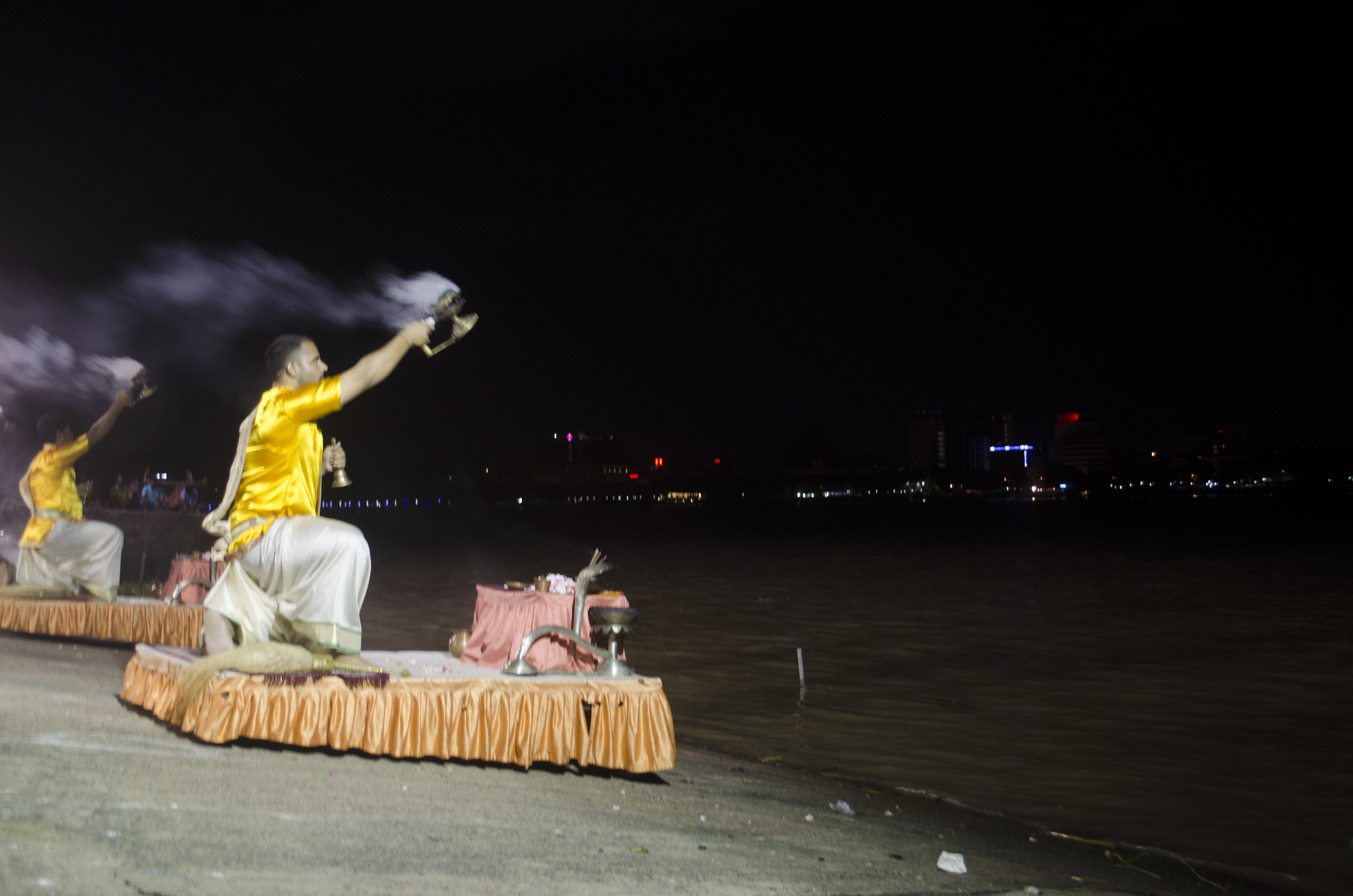
Ganga Arati on the banks of the Hooghly river, Howrah

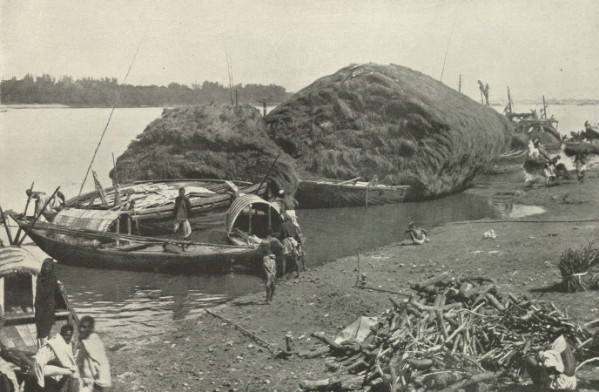
The Hooghly River from the Harvest Fields of Bengal, c. 1905

=== Literature ===
Rudyard Kipling wrote an article, On the Banks of the Hugli (1888), and a short story set on the Hooghli, An Unqualified Pilot (1895).

=== Cultural events ===
The Silk River project aims at exploring the artistic relationship between Kolkata and London through artistic exchange from 10 locations each along the Hooghly River and the River Thames. The 10 places along the Hooghly River are Murshidabad, Krishnagar, Chandernagore, Barrackpore, Jorasanko, Bowbazar, Howrah, Kidderpore, Botanical Gardens and Batanagar. Ten scrolls, painted in the Patua tradition, depicting the 10 places will be carried along the Hooghly River. The event began at Murshidabad on 7 December 2017 and ended at the Victoria Memorial, Kolkata on 17 December.

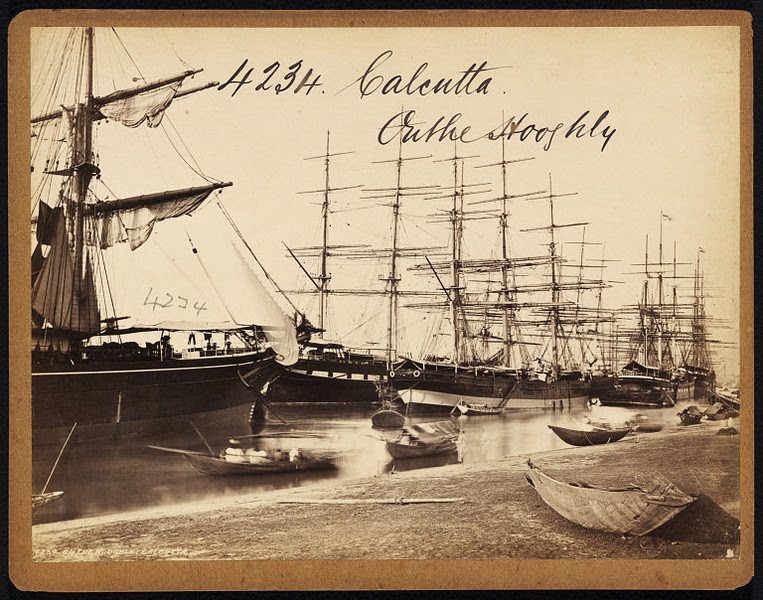
Hooghly River, Calcutta by Francis Frith (taken 1850s-1870s)

== Gallery ==
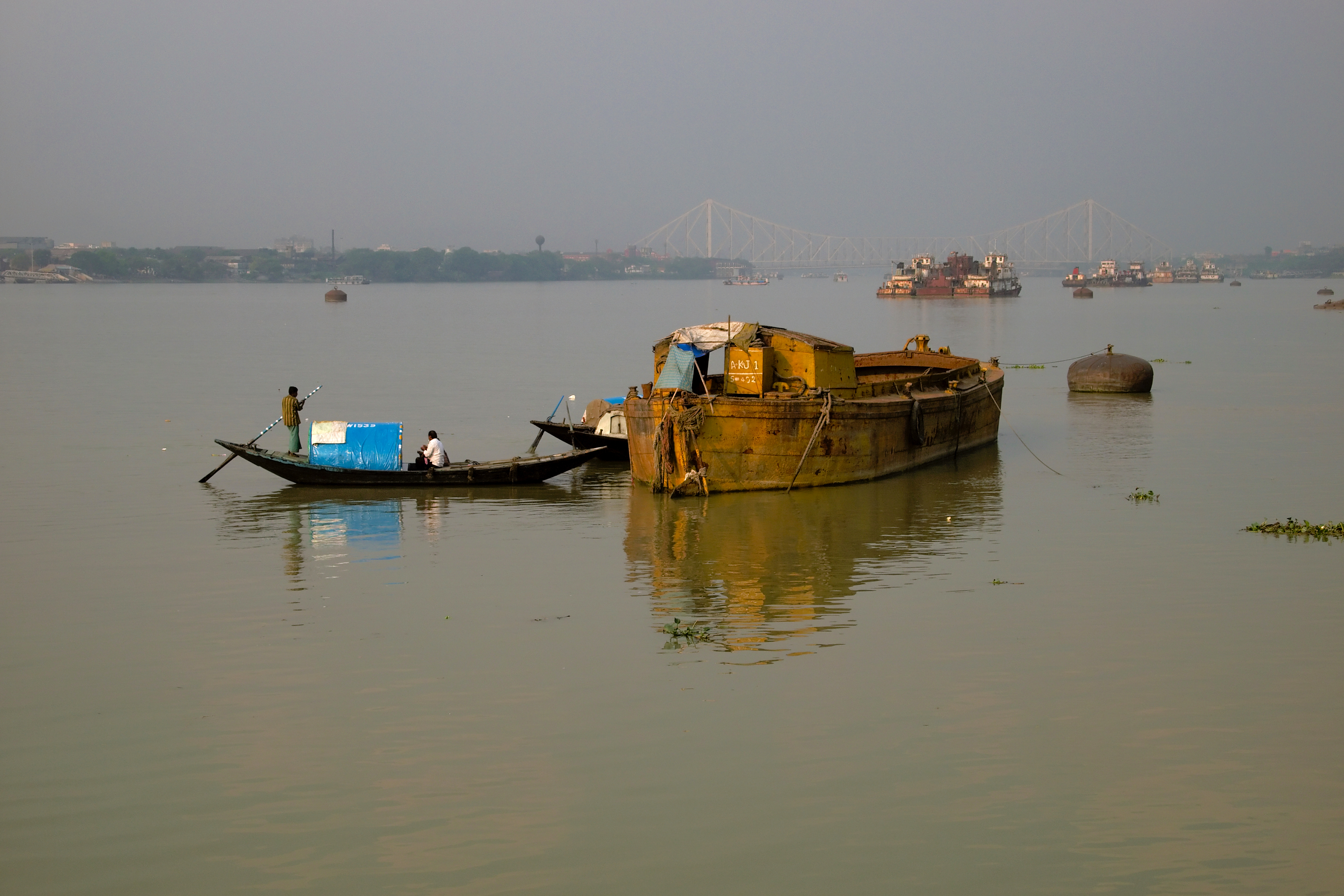
Boats on Hooghly River

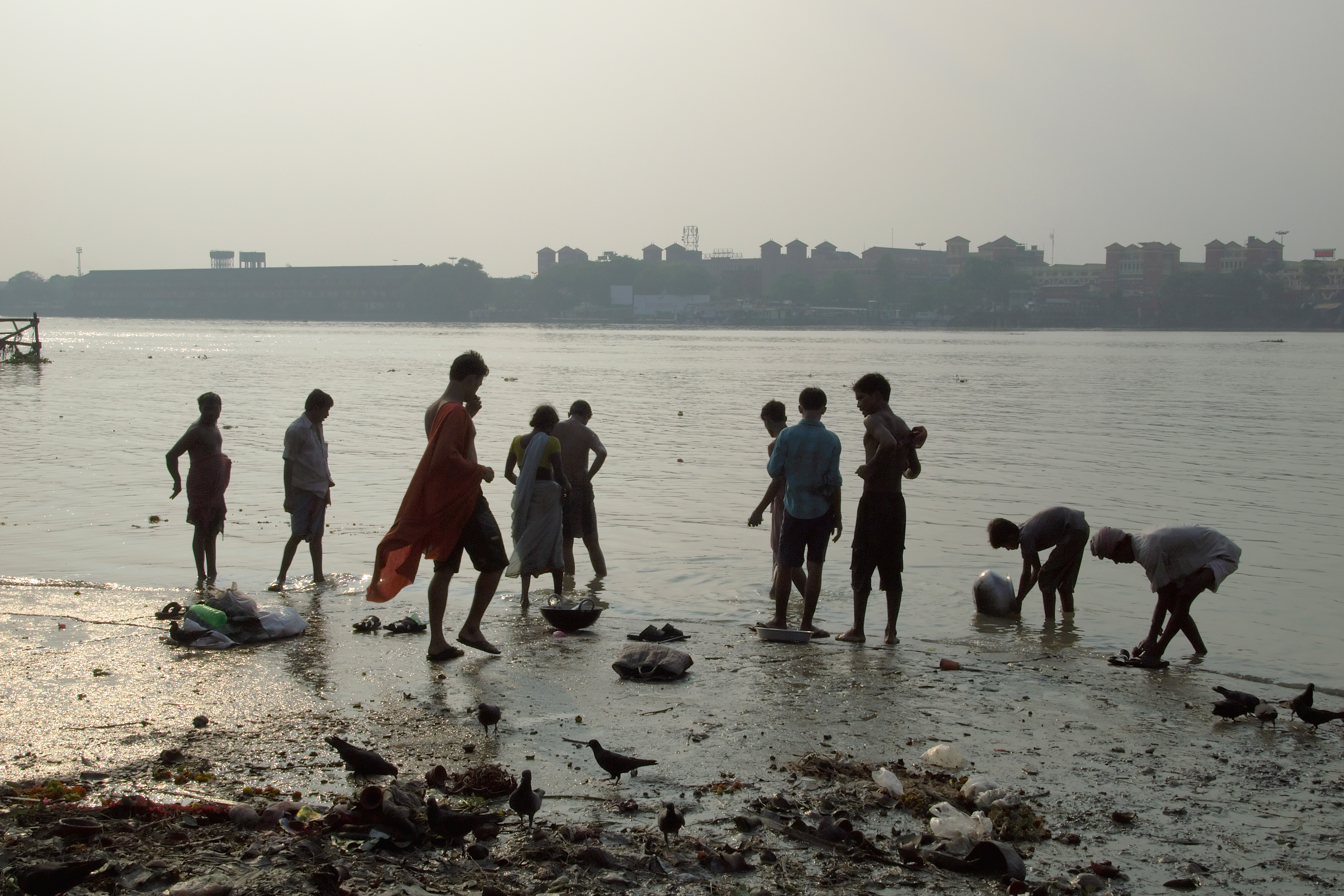
Hooghly River in Kolkata

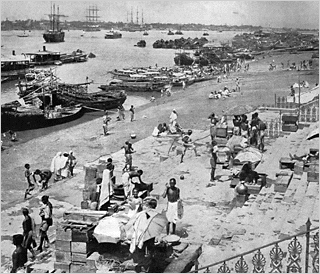
Boats and men on the banks of the Hooghly river, 1915

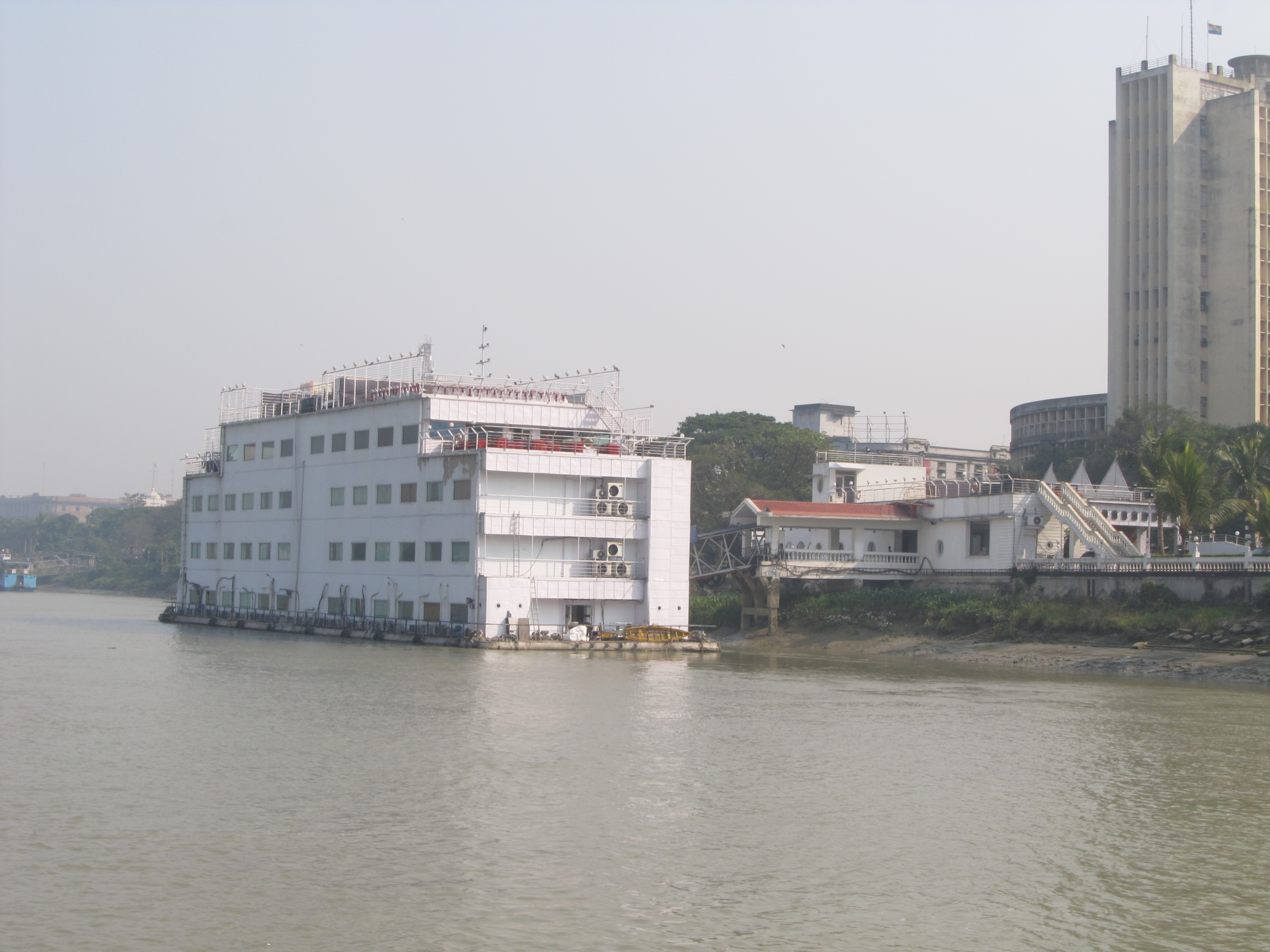
The Floatel in Kolkata located on the river

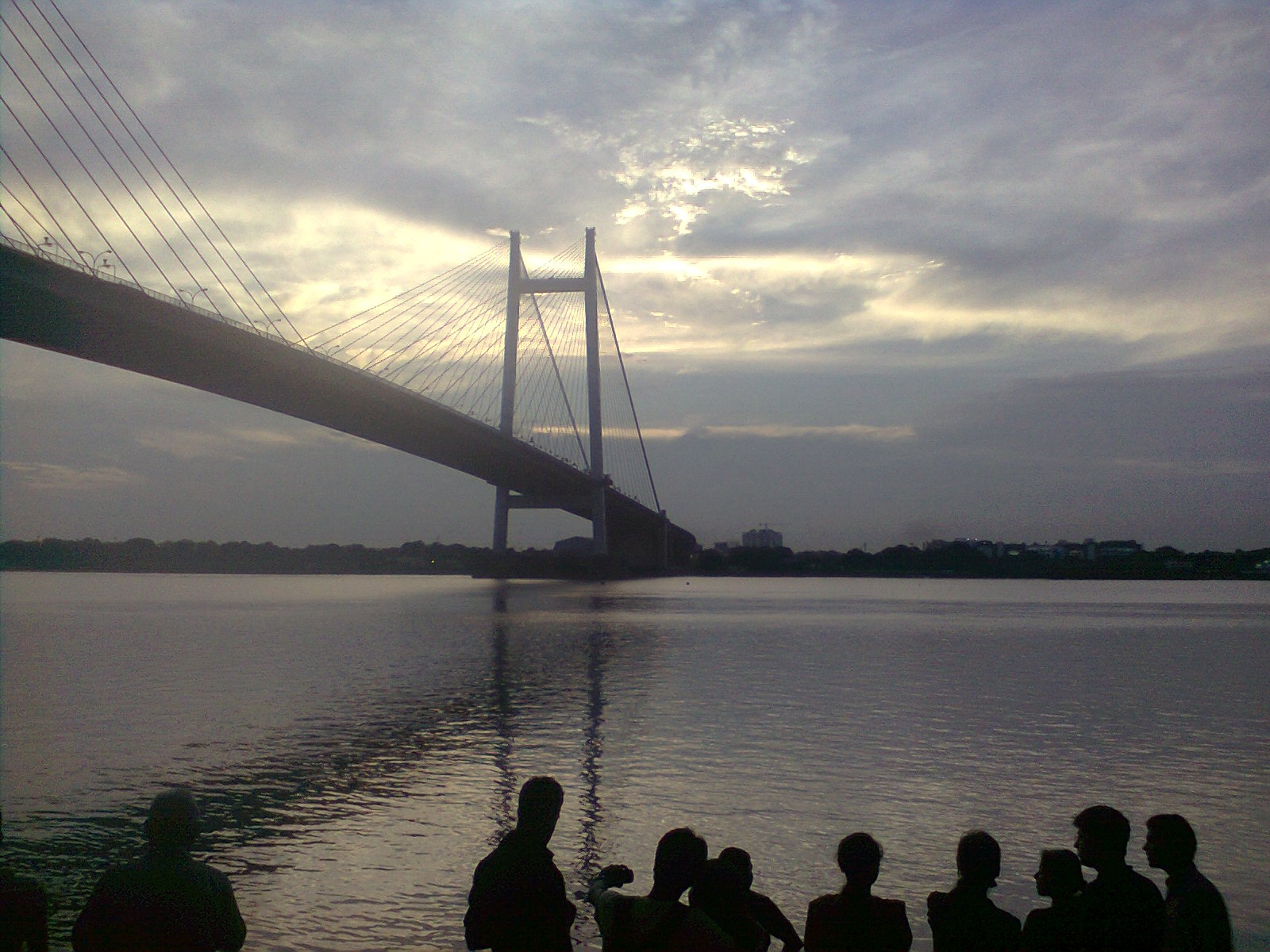
The Prinsep Ghat which is located on the bank of the Hooghly River

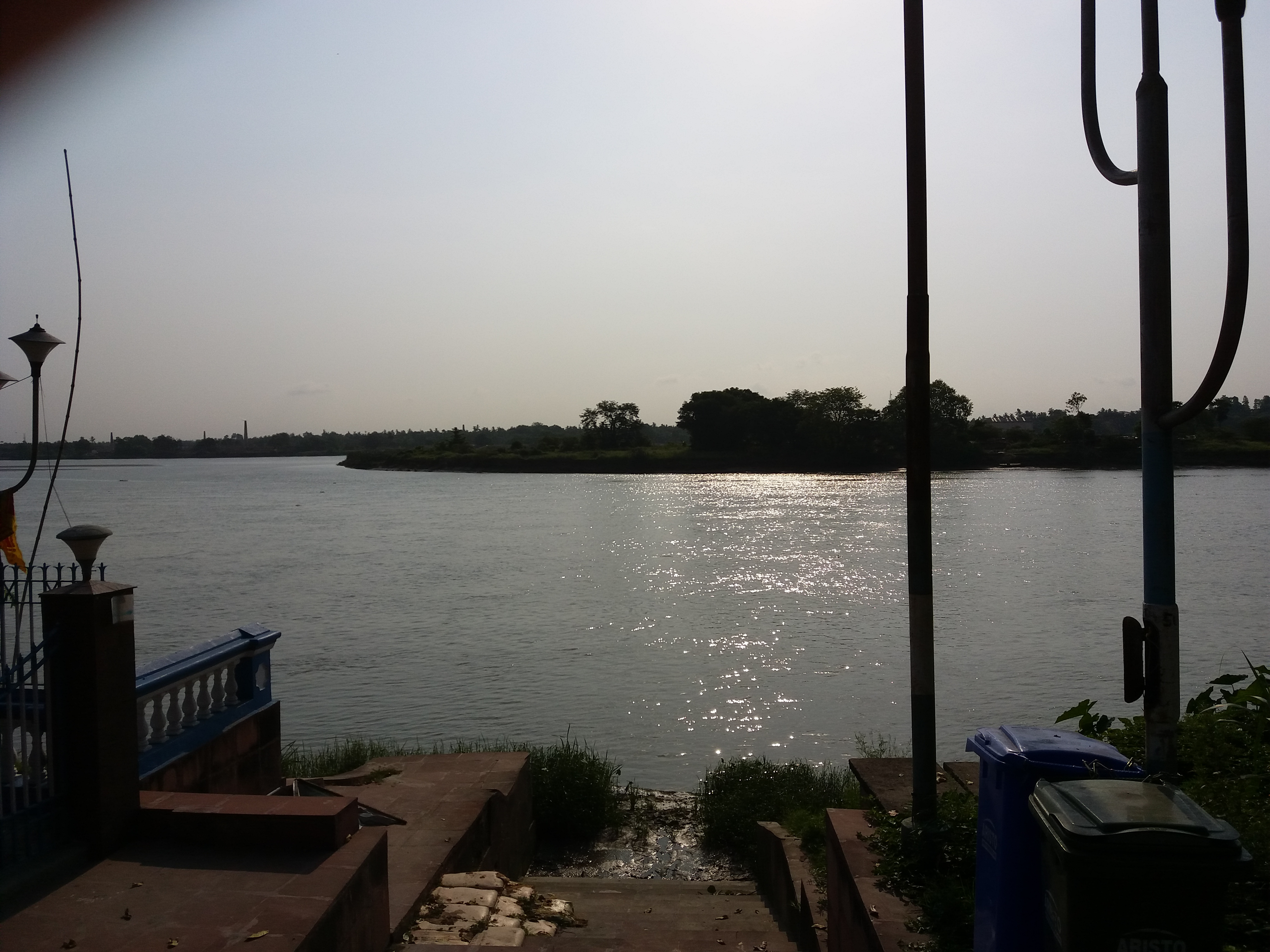
Char on the river at Bansberia, Hooghly district

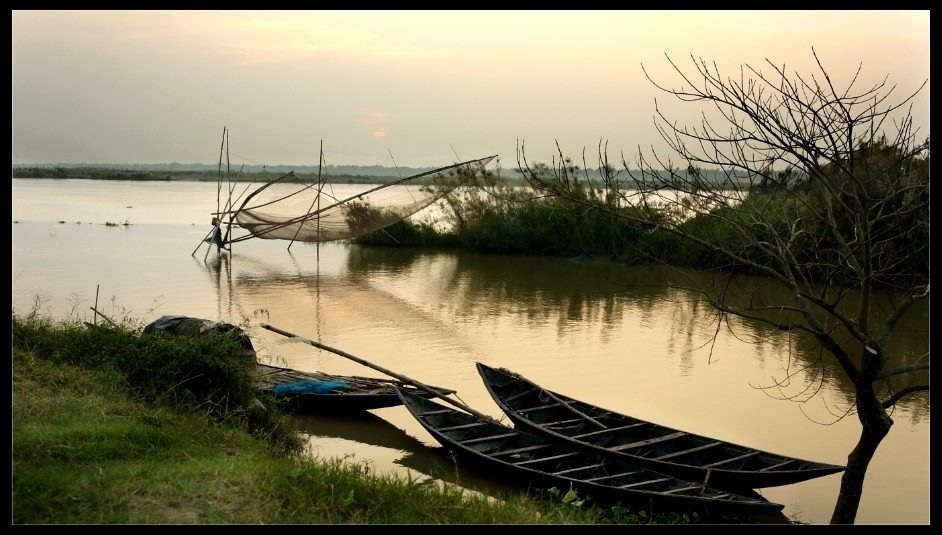
Boats on the river at Shimurali, Nadia district

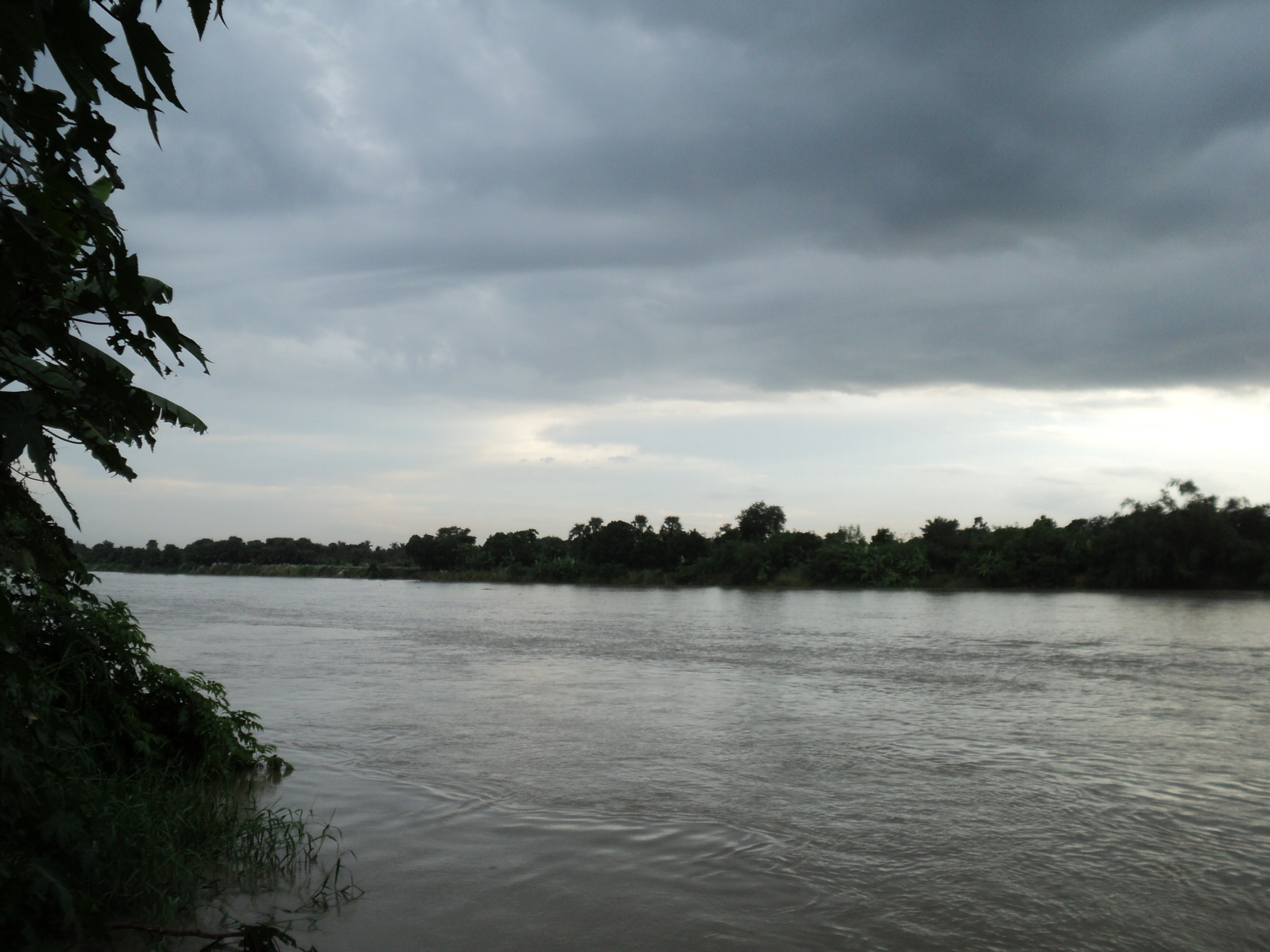
The river behind Hazarduari Palace in Murshidabad district

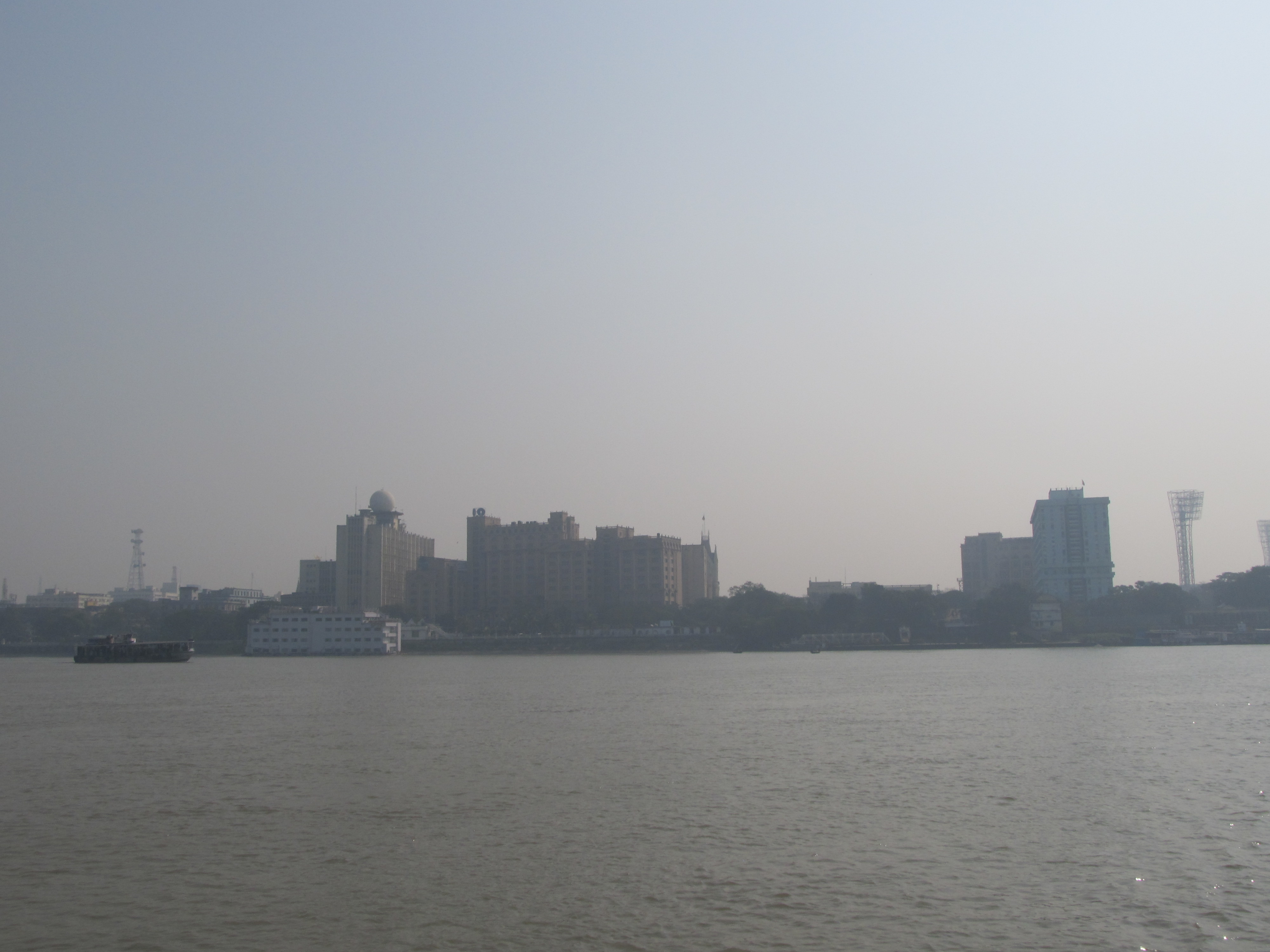
The city of Kolkata lies along the banks of the Hooghly

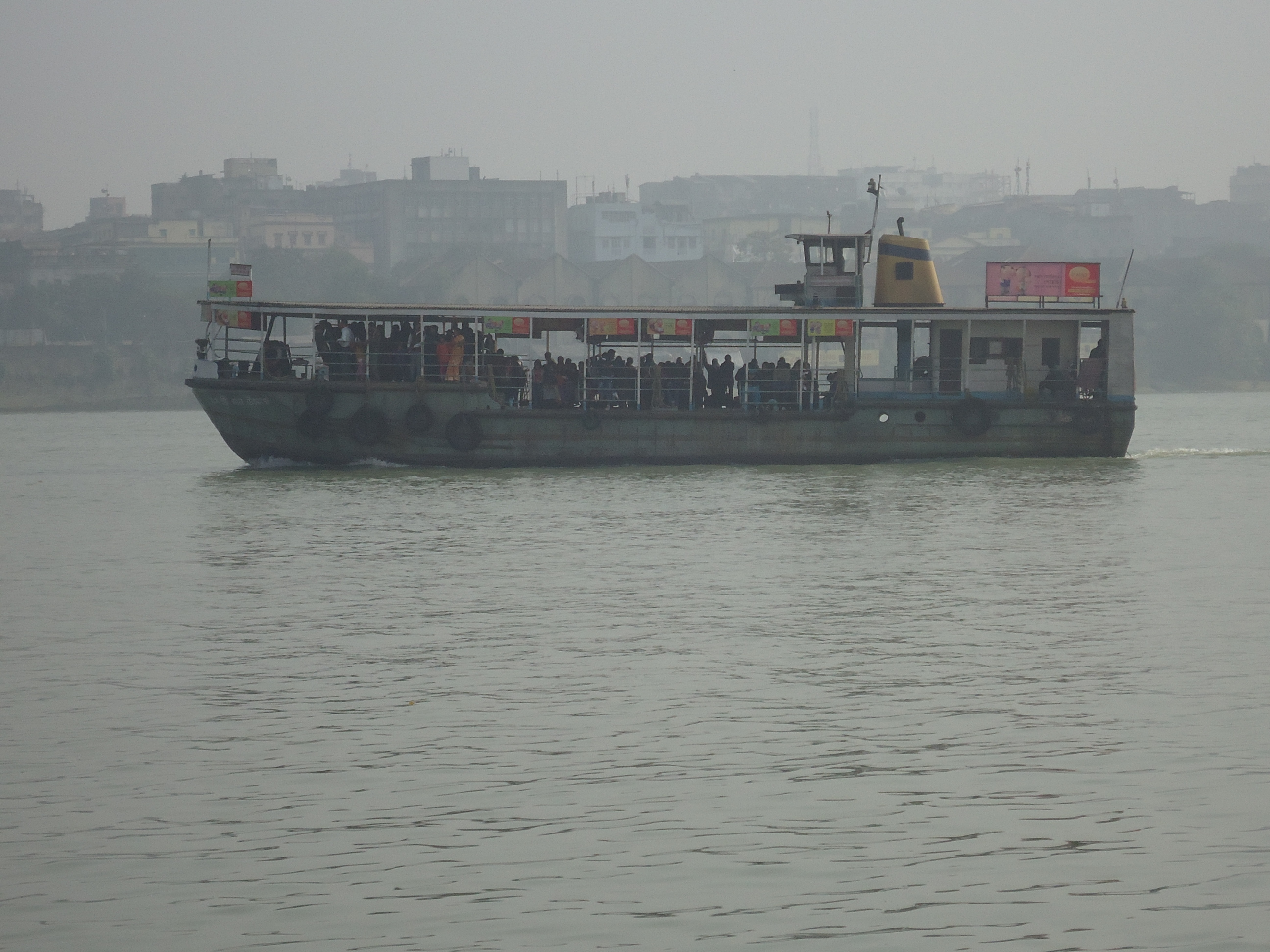
Boat seen from the bank of the Hoogly River at Kolkata

== See also ==
- List of rivers of India
- Kolkata Eye
