= Mertala Phaleya railway station =

Railway station in West Bengal, India

Mertala Phaleya

General information
- Location: Mertala Phaleya, Purba Bardhaman district, West Bengal; India
- Coordinates: 23.480882°N 88.320437°E
- Elevation: 16 m (52 ft)
- System: Indian Railways station and Kolkata Suburban Railway station
- Owner: Indian Railways
- Operator: Eastern Railway
- Platforms: 2
- Tracks: 2

Construction
- Structure type: Standard (on ground station)
- Parking: No
- Cycle facilities: No

Other information
- Status: Functioning
- Station code: MTFA
- Zone(s): Eastern Railway
- Division(s): Howrah

Services
Preceding station	Kolkata Suburban Railway	Following station
Purbasthali towards Howrah Junction	Eastern Line Bandel–Katwa line	Lakshmipur towards Katwa Junction
Route map
Location
- Location within West Bengal Location within India

Mertala Phaleya railway station is a halt railway station on Bandel–Katwa line connecting from Bandel to Katwa, and under the jurisdiction of Howrah railway division of Eastern Railway zone. It is situated at Mertala Phaleya, Purba Bardhaman district in the Indian state of West Bengal. It serves Purbasthali II Community Development Block and surrounding areas. Few EMU local trains stop at Mertala Phaleya railway station.

== History ==
The Hooghly–Katwa Railway constructed a line from Bandel to Katwa in 1913. This line including Mertala Phaleya railway station was electrified in 1994–96 with 25 kV overhead line.
