= LKX =

LKX may refer to:

- Lakshmipur railway station (Indian Railways station code: LKX), a railway station in West Bengal, India
- Link Air Express (ICAO: LKX), a defunct Italian cargo airline
