= Nabadwip Dham–Balurghat Express =

Express train in India

Nabadwip Dham – Balurghat – Nabadwip Dham Nabadwip Dham – Balurghat Express

Overview
- Service type: Express
- Status: Operational
- Locale: West Bengal
- First service: 31 May 2022
- Current operator: Eastern Railway

Route
- Stops: 13
- Distance travelled: 333 km (207 mi)
- Average journey time: 13431 – 6 hours 20 minutes 13432 – 6 hours 45 minutes
- Service frequency: Five days a week (Sunday, Tuesday, Wednesday, Friday, Saturday)
- Train number: 13431 / 13432

On-board services
- Classes: General unreserved, Second sitting
- Seating arrangements: Yes
- Sleeping arrangements: No
- Auto-rack arrangements: Overhead racks
- Catering facilities: No pantry car / No catering
- Observation facilities: Large windows
- Entertainment facilities: No
- Baggage facilities: Available
- Other facilities: Under seat storage

Technical
- Rolling stock: ICF coach
- Track gauge: 1,676 mm (5 ft 6 in) Broad gauge
- Operating speed: 51 km/h (32 mph) average including halts

The 13431 / 13432 Nabadwip Dham – Balurghat Express is an express train operated by the Eastern Railway zone of Indian Railways. It runs between Nabadwip Dham and Balurghat in West Bengal. The train connects several towns and districts across southern and northern parts of the state and serves important stations such as Katwa Junction, Azimganj Junction, New Farakka Junction and Malda Town.

The train operates five days a week and is mainly used by regional passengers, daily commuters and pilgrims travelling between Nadia, Murshidabad, Malda and Dakshin Dinajpur districts.

== Overview ==
The Nabadwip Dham – Balurghat Express service was introduced on 31 May 2022 to improve passenger rail connectivity between the southern and northern districts of West Bengal. The train connects the pilgrimage city of Nabadwip Dham with the district headquarters of Balurghat and passes through important railway junctions including Katwa Junction, Azimganj Junction, New Farakka Junction and Malda Town.

Covering a distance of about 333 km, with an average speed of 51 km/h and maximum speed of 110 km/h the train runs with conventional ICF coach rakes consisting mainly of general unreserved and second sitting coaches. The service operates five days a week and plays an important role in facilitating regional travel and daily commuting across multiple districts of the state.

== Route and timing ==
Station	Distance	Division	13432 Arrival	13432 Departure	13431 Arrival	13431 Departure
Balurghat	0 km	NFR	—	14:30	11:40	—
Gangarampur	32 km	NFR	14:56	14:58	10:53	10:55
Buniadpur	45 km	NFR	15:09	15:11	10:40	10:42
Gazole	73 km	NFR	15:40	15:42	10:15	10:17
Malda Town	106 km	ER	16:40	16:50	09:25	09:35
New Farakka Junction	141 km	ER	17:27	17:29	08:35	08:37
Dhulian Ganga	156 km	ER	17:48	17:50	08:12	08:14
Nimtita	166 km	ER	18:00	18:02	07:59	08:01
Jangipur Road	186 km	ER	18:19	18:21	07:38	07:40
Azimganj Junction	221 km	ER	19:05	19:07	06:42	06:44
Khagraghat Road	235 km	ER	19:20	19:21	06:27	06:28
Bazarsau	263 km	ER	19:40	19:41	06:18	06:20
Salar	277 km	ER	19:59	20:00	06:01	06:02
Katwa Junction	294 km	ER	20:15	20:17	05:45	05:47
Nabadwip Dham	333 km	ER	21:15	—	—	05:20

== Coach composition ==
The train generally operates with an ICF coach rake consisting of 12 coaches.

13431 – Nabadwip Dham → Balurghat

Loco	1	2	3	4	5	6	7	8	9	10	11	12
	SLR	GEN	GEN	GEN	GEN	GEN	GEN	GEN	GEN	D2	D1	SLR

13432 – Balurghat → Nabadwip Dham

Loco	1	2	3	4	5	6	7	8	9	10	11	12
	SLR	D1	D2	GEN	GEN	GEN	GEN	GEN	GEN	GEN	GEN	SLR

== Catering ==
The train does not have a pantry car and no onboard catering services are provided.

== Traction ==
As the route is fully electrified, the train is hauled by a WAP-4 electric locomotive of the Howrah Loco Shed.

== Rake reversals and sharing ==
=== Reversal ===
The train runs on a continuous route and does not require any rake reversal during its journey.

=== Sharing ===
The train shares its rake with the 13421 / 13422 Nabadwip Dham – Malda Town Express.

== See also ==
- Nabadwip Dham railway station
- Balurghat railway station
- Malda Town railway station
- Howrah–Balurghat Bi-weekly Express
- Howrah–Malda Town Intercity Express (via Azimganj)
- Teesta Torsha Express
