= Patuli railway station =

Railway station in West Bengal, India

Patuli
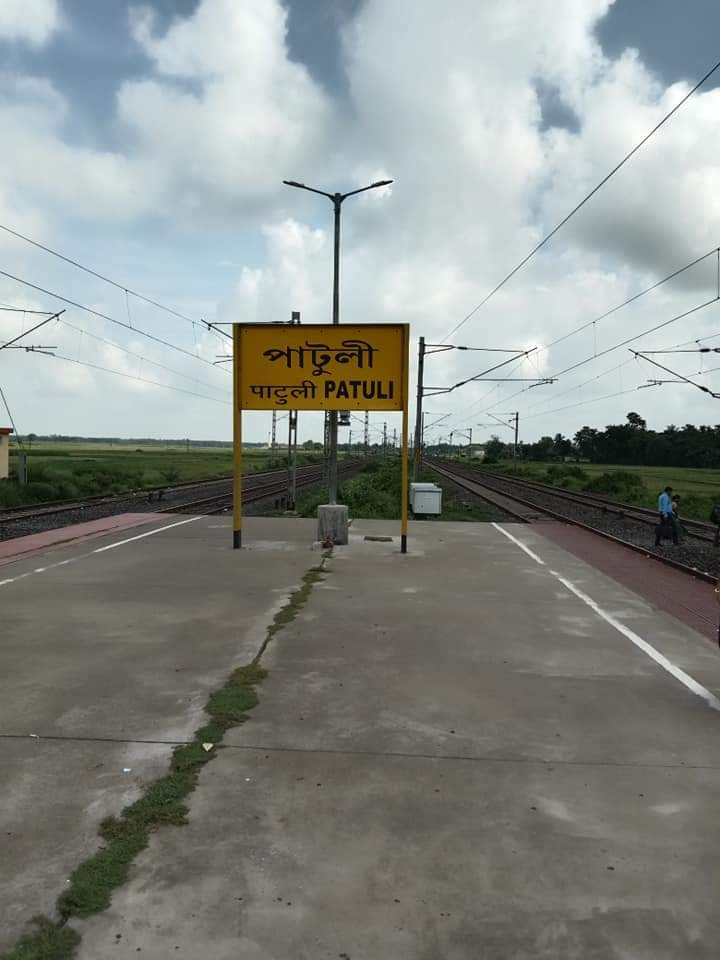

General information
- Location: Santoshpur Pila, Patuli, Purba Bardhaman district, West Bengal; India
- Coordinates: 23.547524°N 88.252093°E
- Elevation: 18 m (59 ft)
- System: Indian Railways station and Kolkata Suburban Railway station
- Owner: Indian Railways
- Operator: Eastern Railway
- Platforms: 4
- Tracks: 2

Construction
- Structure type: Standard (on ground station)
- Parking: No
- Cycle facilities: No

Other information
- Status: Functioning
- Station code: PTAE
- Zone(s): Eastern Railway
- Division(s): Howrah

Services
Preceding station	Kolkata Suburban Railway	Following station
Belerhat towards Howrah Junction	Eastern Line Bandel–Katwa line	Agradwip towards Katwa Junction
Route map
Location
- Location within West Bengal Location within India

Patuli railway station is a railway station on Bandel–Katwa line connecting from Bandel to Katwa, and under the jurisdiction of Howrah railway division of Eastern Railway zone. It is situated beside State Highway 6 at Santoshpur Pila, Patuli, of Purba Bardhaman district in the Indian state of West Bengal. It serves Patuli and surrounding area. Few EMUs and passengers trains stop at Patuli railway station.

== History ==
The Hooghly–Katwa Railway constructed a line from Bandel to Katwa in 1913. This line including Patuli railway station was electrified in 1994–96 with 25 kV overhead line.
