= Kalinagar railway station =

Railway station in West Bengal, India

Kalinagar
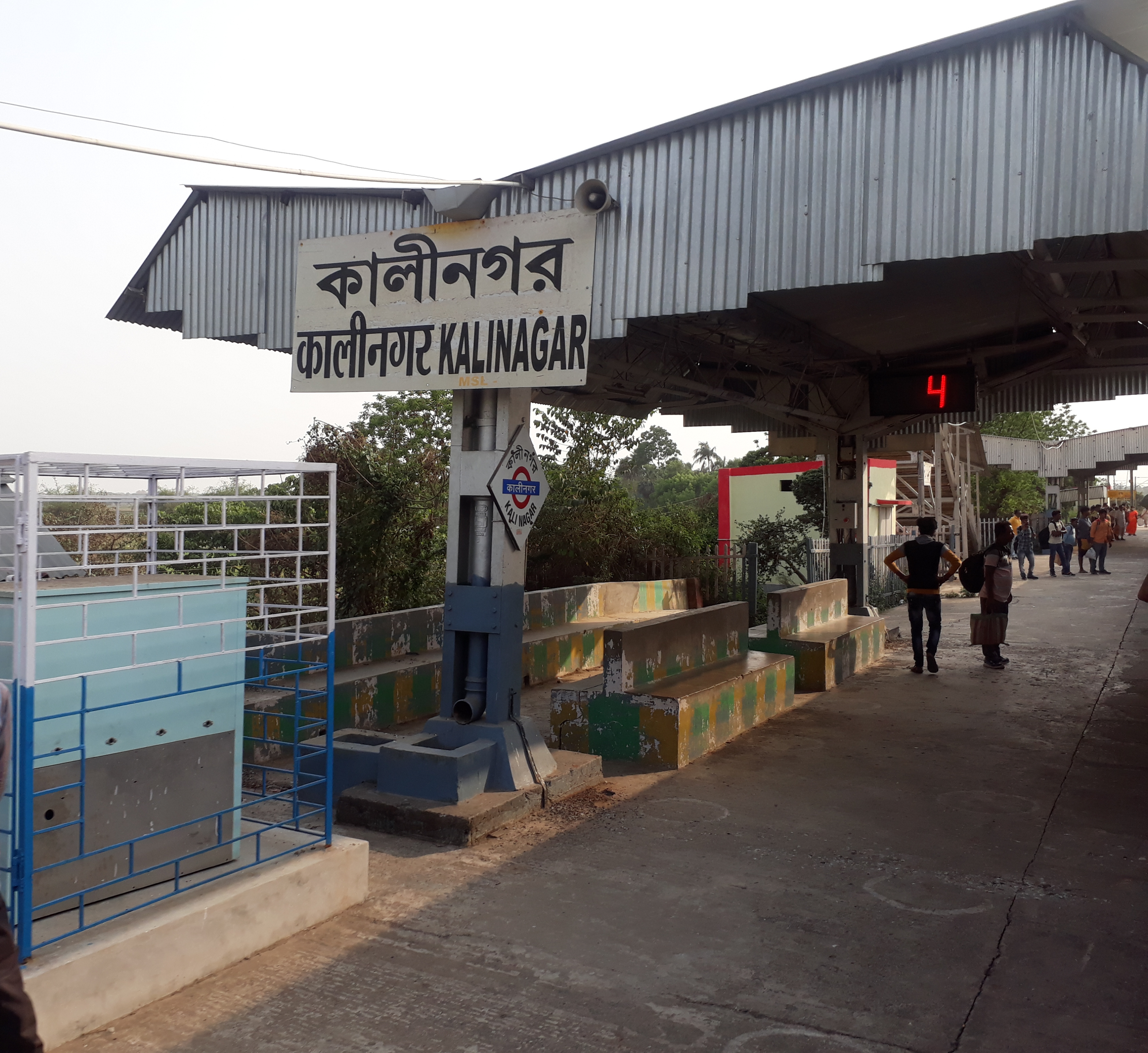
- Kalinagar railway station

General information
- Location: State Highway 6, Kalinagar, Nadia district, West Bengal; India
- Coordinates: 23.365836°N 88.335893°E
- Elevation: 9 m (30 ft)
- System: Indian Railways station and Kolkata Suburban Railway station
- Owner: Indian Railways
- Operator: Eastern Railway
- Platforms: 2
- Tracks: 2

Construction
- Structure type: Standard (on ground station)
- Parking: No
- Cycle facilities: No

Other information
- Status: Functioning
- Station code: KLNT
- Zone(s): Eastern Railway
- Division(s): Howrah

Services
Preceding station	Kolkata Suburban Railway	Following station
Samudragarh towards Howrah Junction	Eastern Line Bandel–Katwa line	Nabadwip Dham towards Katwa Junction
Route map
Location
- Location within West Bengal Location within India

Kalinagar railway station is a railway station on Bandel–Katwa line connecting from Bandel to Katwa, and under the jurisdiction of Howrah railway division of Eastern Railway zone. It is situated beside State Highway 6, Kalinagar, Purba Bardhaman district in the Indian state of West Bengal. Number of EMU and few Passenger trains stop at Kalinagar railway station.

== History ==
The Hooghly–Katwa Railway constructed a line from Bandel to Katwa in 1913. This line including Kalinagar railway station was electrified in 1994–96 with 25 kV overhead line.
