= Tribeni railway station =

Railway station in West Bengal, India

Tribeni
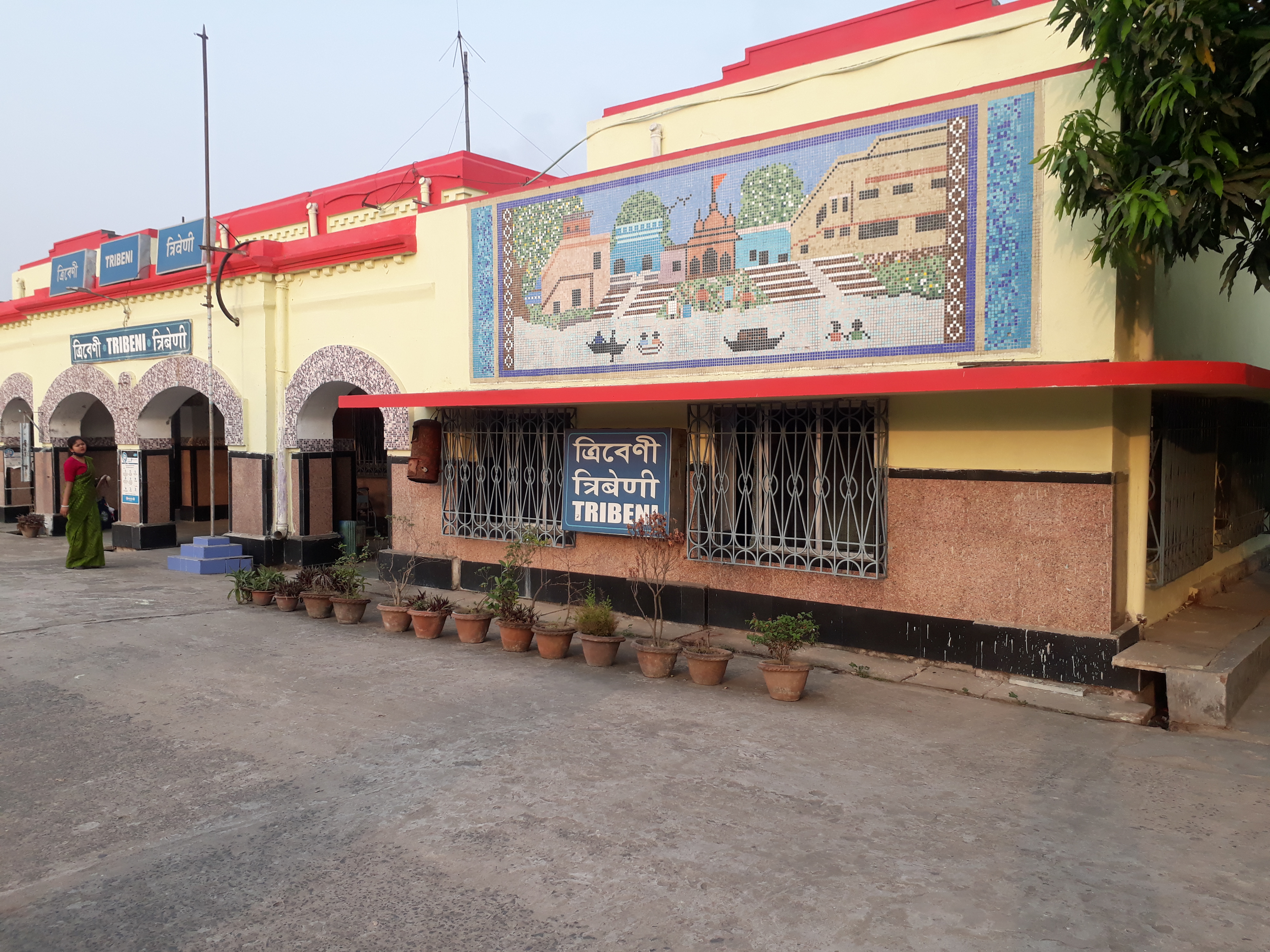

General information
- Location: Station Road, Tribeni, Hooghly district, West Bengal; India
- Coordinates: 22.991405°N 88.398737°E
- Elevation: 14.66 m (48.1 ft)
- System: Indian Railways station and Kolkata Suburban Railway station
- Owner: Indian Railways
- Operator: Eastern Railway
- Line: Bandel–Katwa line Tribeni-Mogra Avoiding line
- Platforms: 4
- Tracks: 6

Construction
- Structure type: Standard (on ground station)
- Parking: Yes
- Cycle facilities: Yes

Other information
- Status: Functioning
- Station code: TBAE
- Zone(s): Eastern Railway
- Division(s): Howrah

History
- Opened: 1913
- Rebuilt: 2010

Passengers
- 2k-3k per day

Services
Preceding station	Kolkata Suburban Railway	Following station
Islampara Halt towards Howrah Junction	Eastern Line Bandel–Katwa line	Kuntighat towards Katwa Junction
Route map
Location
- Location within West Bengal Location within India

Tribeni railway station is railway station on Bandel–Katwa line connecting from Bandel (8 km (5.0 mi) from Bandel) to Katwa, and under the jurisdiction of Howrah railway division (48 km (30 mi) from hwh) of Eastern Railway zone. It is situated at Station Road, Masterpara, Tribeni, Hooghly district in the Indian state of West Bengal. There is also a single line connecting Tribeni to Mogra which is only used for goods trains.

== History ==
The Hooghly–Katwa Railway constructed a line from Bandel to Katwa in 1913. This line including Tribeni railway station was electrified in 1994–96 with 25 kV overhead line.
