= Behula railway station =

Railway station in West Bengal, India

Behula
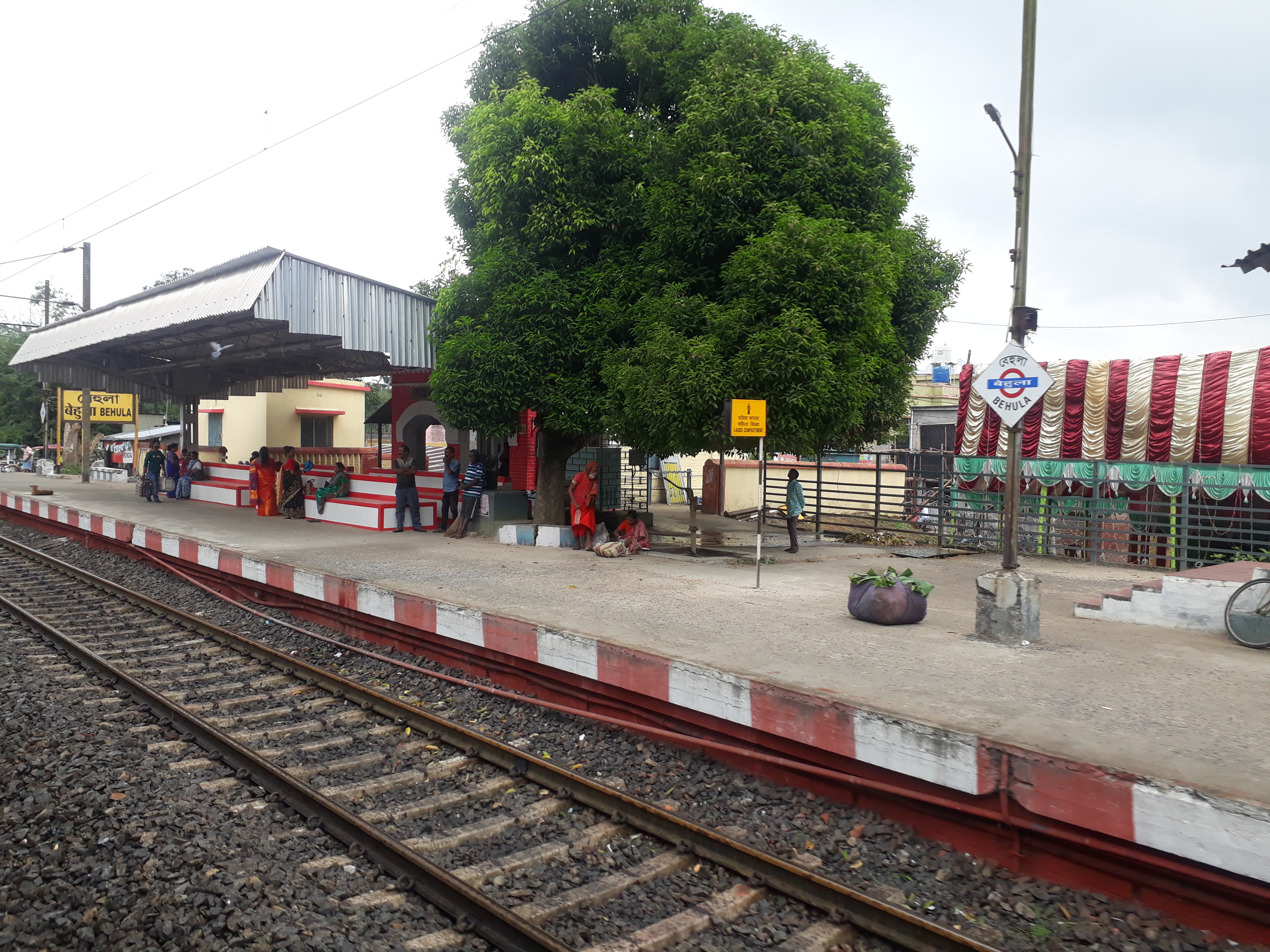
- Behula railway station

General information
- Location: Kalna Road, Behula, Hooghly district, West Bengal; India
- Coordinates: 23.180586°N 88.428691°E
- Elevation: 15 m (49 ft)
- System: Kolkata Suburban Railway
- Owner: Indian Railways
- Operator: Eastern Railway
- Platforms: 2
- Tracks: 2

Construction
- Structure type: Standard (on ground station)
- Parking: No
- Cycle facilities: No

Other information
- Status: Functioning
- Station code: BHLA
- Zone(s): Eastern Railway
- Division(s): Howrah

Services
Preceding station	Kolkata Suburban Railway	Following station
Somra Bazar towards Howrah Junction	Eastern Line Bandel–Katwa line	Guptipara towards Katwa Junction
Route map
Location
- Location within West Bengal Location within India

Behula railway station is a railway station on the Bandel–Katwa line connecting from Bandel to Katwa, and under the jurisdiction of the Howrah railway division of the Eastern Railway zone. It is situated beside Kalna Road, Behula, Hooghly district in the Indian state of West Bengal. Number of EMU local and passenger trains stop at Behula railway station.

== History ==
The Hooghly–Katwa Railway constructed a line from Bandel to Katwa in 1913. This line including Behula railway station was electrified in 1994–96 with a 25 kV overhead line.
