= Dainhat railway station =

Railway station in West Bengal, India

Dainhat

General information
- Location: Dainhat Road, Dainhat, Purba Bardhaman district, West Bengal; India
- Coordinates: 23.601096°N 88.170864°E
- Elevation: 19 m (62 ft)
- System: Indian Railways station and Kolkata Suburban Railway station
- Owner: Indian Railways
- Operator: Eastern Railway
- Platforms: 4
- Tracks: 2

Construction
- Structure type: Standard (on ground station)
- Parking: Limited
- Cycle facilities: Available

Other information
- Status: Functioning
- Station code: DHAE
- Zone(s): Eastern Railway
- Division(s): Howrah

Services
Preceding station	Kolkata Suburban Railway	Following station
Sahebtala towards Howrah Junction	Eastern Line Bandel–Katwa line	Katwa Junction Terminus
Route map
Location
- Location within West Bengal Location within India

Dainhat railway station is a Kolkata Suburban Railway station on the Bandel–Katwa line connecting from Bandel to Katwa, and under the jurisdiction of Howrah railway division of Eastern Railway zone. It is situated at Dhramatala, Dainhat of Purba Bardhaman district in the Indian state of West Bengal. A Number of EMUs and passengers trains stop at Dainhat railway station. The distance between Howrah and Dainhat railway station is approximately 137 km.

== History ==
The Hooghly–Katwa Railway constructed a line from Bandel to Katwa in 1913. This line including Dainhat railway station was electrified in 1994–96 with a 25 kV overhead line.
