= Nabadwip Dham–Malda Town Express =

Overview
- Service type: Express
- Locale: 13 September 2009; 16 years ago
- Current operator: Eastern Railway zone

Route
- Termini: Nabadwip Dham (NDAE); Malda Town (MLDT)
- Stops: 14
- Distance travelled: 227 km (141 mi)
- Average journey time: 4h 50m
- Service frequency: Daily (Note: Runs seven days in a week for every direction.)
- Train number: 13421/13422

On-board services
- Class: Second Seating(2S)
- Seating arrangements: Yes
- Sleeping arrangements: No
- Catering facilities: No
- Observation facilities: ICF coach
- Entertainment facilities: No
- Baggage facilities: Overhead racks
- Other facilities: Below the seats

Technical
- Rolling stock: 2
- Track gauge: 1,676 mm (5 ft 6 in)
- Operating speed: 46 km/h (29 mph), including halts

The Nabadwip Dham–Malda Town Express is an Express train belonging to Eastern Railway zone that runs between Malda Town and Nabadwip Dham railway station in Indian state of West Bengal. It is currently being operated with 13421/13422 train numbers on a daily basis.

== Service ==
The 13421/Nabadwip Dham–Malda Town Express has average speed of 47 km/h and covers 227 km in 4 h 50 m. The 13422/Malda Town–Nabadwip Dham Express has average speed of 45 km/h and covers 227 km in 5 h 5 m.

== Route and halts ==
The important halts of the train are:

- Nabadwip Dham
- Katwa Junction
- Salar
- Bazarsau
- Khagraghat Road
- Azimganj Junction
- Jangipur Road
- Nimtita
- Dhulian Ganga
- New Farakka Junction
- Malda Town

== Coach composition ==
The train has standard ICF rakes with a maximum speed of 110 km/h. The train consists of 12 coaches:

- 10 Second Seating
- 2 Seating cum Luggage Rake
- Coach Sequence:

GEN D1 D2 D3 D4 D5 D6 D7 D8 D9 D10 GEN

== Traction ==
Both trains were earlier hauled by a Howrah Loco Shed or Bardhaman Loco Shed-based WDM-3A diesel locomotive from Nabadwip to English Bazar and vice versa. As the route is now fully electrified, a Howrah shed based WAP-4 or WAP-7 powers the train for its entire journey.

== See also ==
- Malda Town railway station
- Nabadwip Dham railway station
- Kolkata–Radhikapur Express
- Hate Bazare Express
- Howrah–Balurghat Bi-Weekly Express
