= Bishnupriya railway station =

Railway Station in West Bengal, India

Bishnupriya
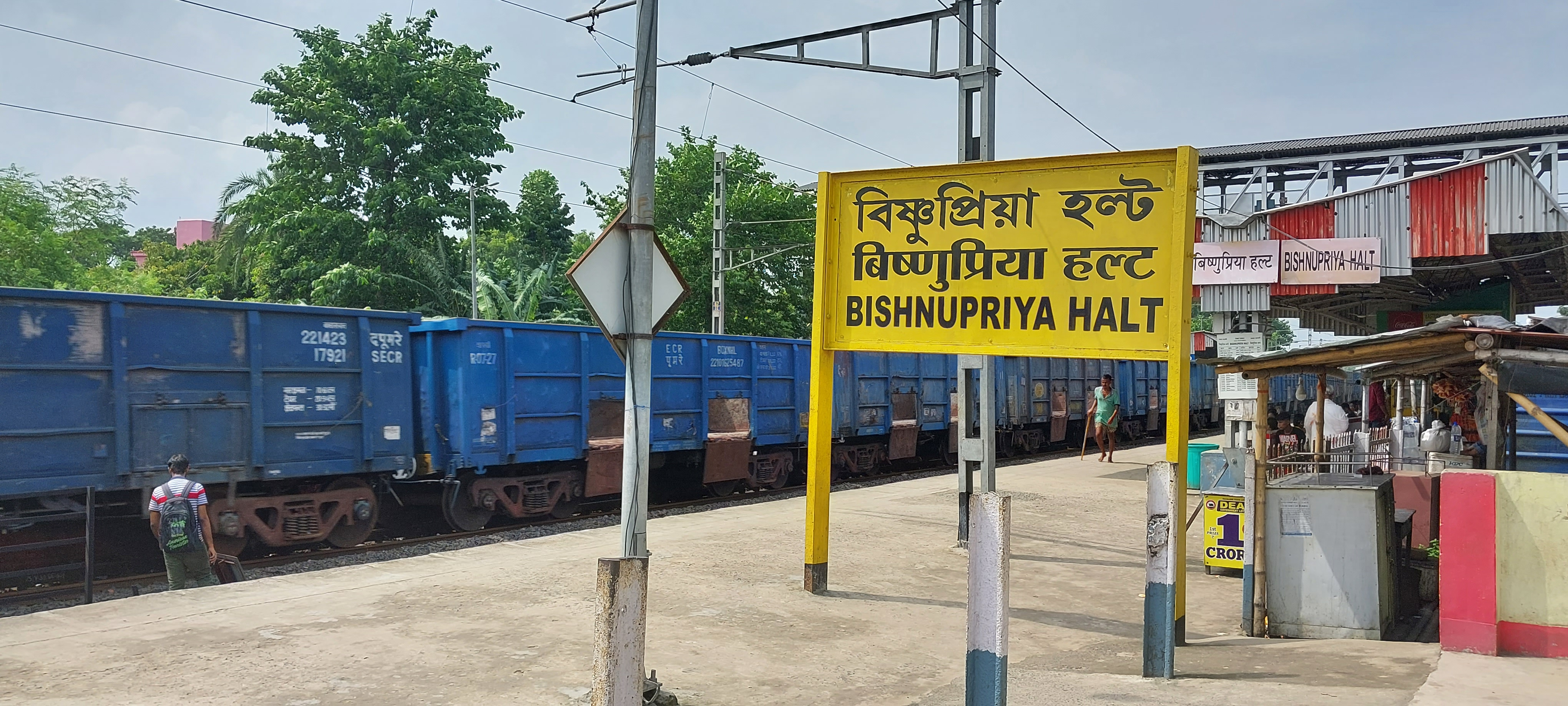

General information
- Location: Nabadwip, West Bengal; India
- Coordinates: 23.414048°N 88.355435°E
- Elevation: 15 m (49 ft)
- System: Indian Railways station and Kolkata Suburban Railway station
- Owner: Indian Railways
- Operator: Eastern Railway
- Platforms: 2
- Tracks: 2

Construction
- Structure type: Standard (on ground station)
- Parking: No
- Cycle facilities: No

Other information
- Status: Functioning
- Station code: VSPR
- Zone(s): Eastern Railway
- Division(s): Howrah

Services
Preceding station	Kolkata Suburban Railway	Following station
Nabadwip Dham towards Howrah Junction	Eastern Line Bandel–Katwa line	Bhandartikuri towards Katwa Junction
Route map
Location
- Location within West Bengal Location within India

Bishnupriya railway station is a halt railway station on Bandel–Katwa line connecting from Bandel to Katwa, and under the jurisdiction of Howrah railway division of Eastern Railway zone. It is situated beside Srirampur Road at Nabadwip, Nadia district in the Indian state of West Bengal. Few EMU and Passenger trains stop at Bishnupriya railway station.

== History ==
The Hooghly–Katwa Railway constructed a line from Bandel to Katwa in 1913. This line including Bishnupriya railway station was electrified in 1994–96 with 25 kV overhead line.
