= Agradwip railway station =

Railway station in West Bengal, India

Agradwip

General information
- Location: State Highway 6, Agrdwip, Purba Bardhaman district, West Bengal; India
- Coordinates: 23.5813°N 88.2264°E
- Elevation: 18 m (59 ft)
- System: Kolkata Suburban Railway
- Owner: Indian Railways
- Operator: Eastern Railway
- Line: 2
- Platforms: 2
- Tracks: 2
- Connections: 0

Construction
- Structure type: At grade
- Depth: 18 m (59 ft)
- Parking: No
- Cycle facilities: No
- Accessible: Yes

Other information
- Status: Functioning
- Station code: AGAE
- Zone(s): Eastern Railway
- Division(s): Howrah

History
- Opened: British period
- Rebuilt: 2016

Services
Preceding station	Kolkata Suburban Railway	Following station
Patuli towards Howrah Junction	Eastern Line Bandel–Katwa line	Sahebtala towards Katwa Junction
Route map
Location
- Location within West Bengal Location within India

Agradwip railway station is a railway station on Bandel–Katwa line connecting from Bandel to Katwa, and under the jurisdiction of Howrah railway division of Eastern Railway zone. It is situated beside State Highway 6 at Gazipur, Agradwip of Purba Bardhaman district in the Indian state of West Bengal. Few EMUs and passengers trains stop at Agradwip railway station.

== History ==
The Hooghly–Katwa Railway constructed a line from Bandel to Katwa in 1913. This line including Agradwip railway station was electrified in 1994–96 with 25 kV overhead line.Nearby Village name Choto Meigachi.
