= Khamargachi railway station =

Railway Station in West Bengal, India

Khamargachi
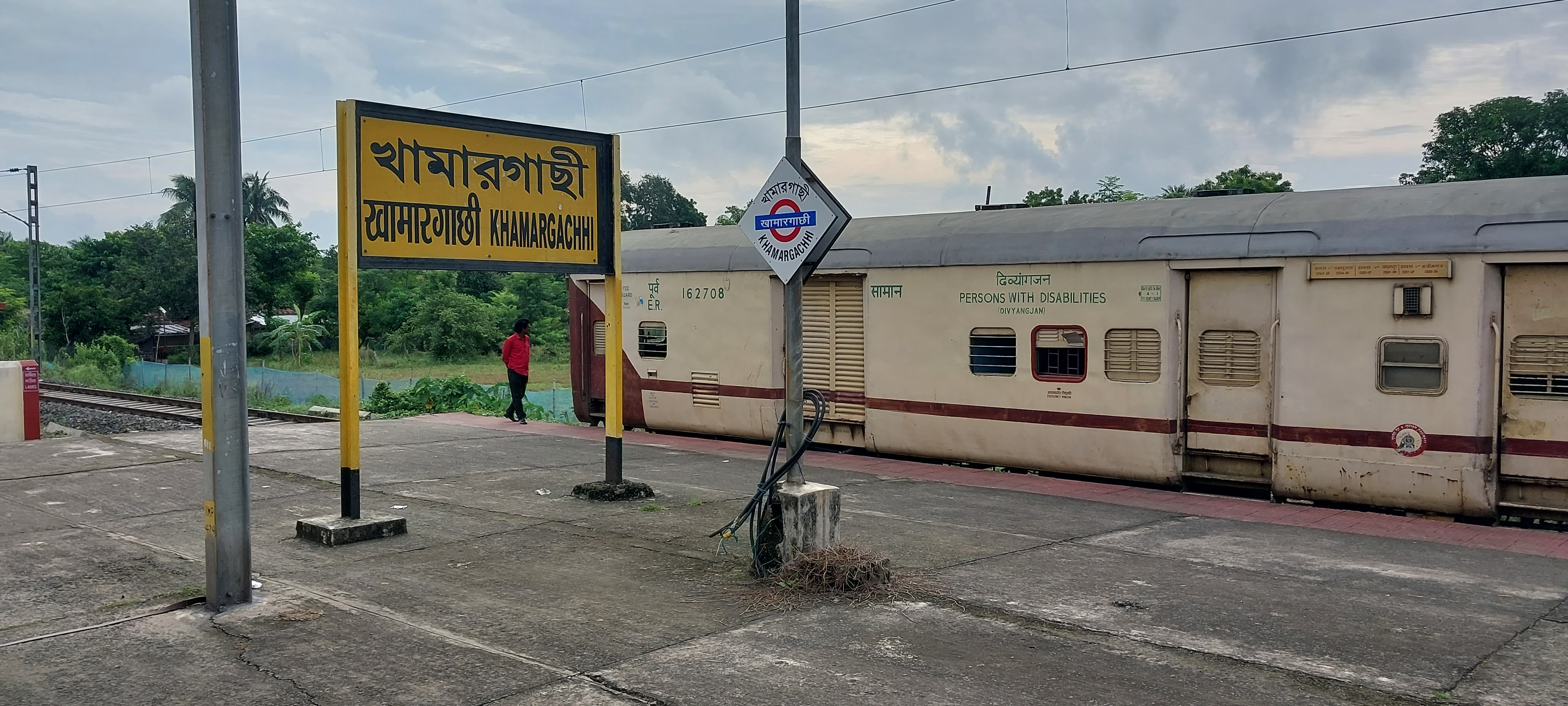
- Khamargachhi railway station

General information
- Location: Sija, Khamargachi, Hooghly district, West Bengal; India
- Coordinates: 23.053988°N 88.444013°E
- Elevation: 14 m (46 ft)
- System: Indian Railways station and Kolkata Suburban Railway station
- Owner: Indian Railways
- Operator: Eastern Railway
- Platforms: 4
- Tracks: 2

Construction
- Structure type: Standard (on ground station)
- Parking: No
- Cycle facilities: No

Other information
- Status: Functioning
- Station code: KMAE
- Zone(s): Eastern Railway
- Division(s): Howrah

Services
Preceding station	Kolkata Suburban Railway	Following station
Dumurdaha towards Howrah Junction	Eastern Line Bandel–Katwa line	Jirat towards Katwa Junction
Route map
Location
- Location within West Bengal Location within India

Khamargachi railway station is a railway station on Bandel–Katwa line connecting from Bandel to Katwa, and under the jurisdiction of Howrah railway division of Eastern Railway zone. It is situated at Khamargachi, Hooghly district in the Indian state of West Bengal. Number of EMU local and passenger trains stop at Khamargachi railway station.

== History ==
The Hooghly–Katwa Railway constructed a line from Bandel to Katwa in 1913. This line including Khamargachi railway station was electrified in 1994–96 with 25 kV overhead line.
