= Baghnapara railway station =

Railway station in West Bengal, India

Baghnapara
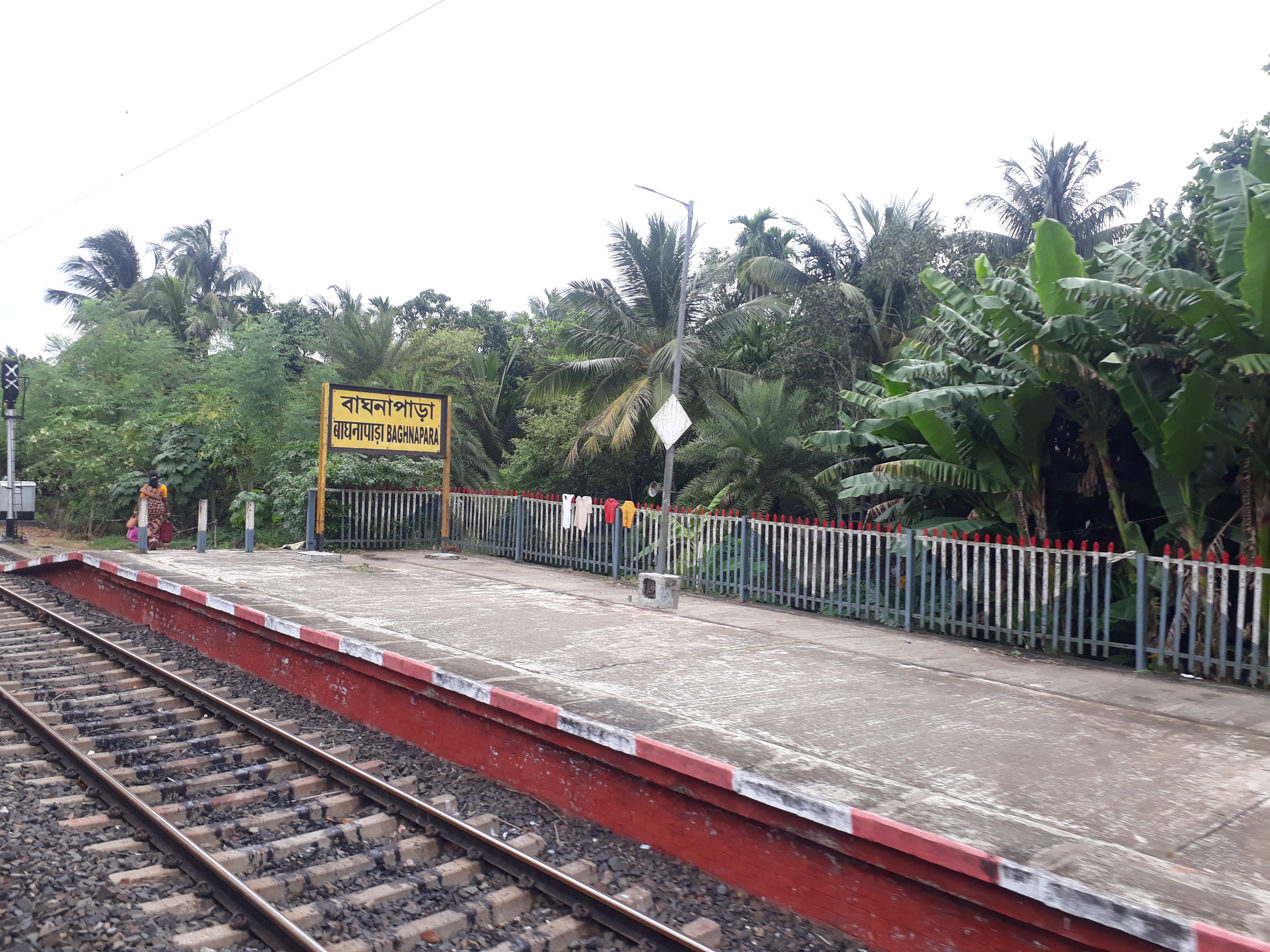
- Baghnapara railway station

General information
- Location: Krishnadebpur, Baghnapara, Purba Bardhaman district, West Bengal; India
- Coordinates: 23.241464°N 88.329471°E
- Elevation: 15 m (49 ft)
- System: Kolkata Suburban Railway
- Owner: Indian Railways
- Operator: Eastern Railway
- Platforms: 2
- Tracks: 2

Construction
- Structure type: Standard (on ground station)
- Parking: No
- Cycle facilities: No

Other information
- Status: Functioning
- Station code: BGRA
- Zone(s): Eastern Railway
- Division(s): Howrah

Services
Preceding station	Kolkata Suburban Railway	Following station
Ambika Kalna towards Howrah Junction	Eastern Line Bandel–Katwa line	Dhatrigram towards Katwa Junction
Route map
Location
- Location within West Bengal Location within India

Baghnapara railway station is a railway station on Bandel–Katwa line connecting from Bandel to Katwa, and under the jurisdiction of Howrah railway division of Eastern Railway zone. It is situated at Krishnadebpur, Baghnapara, Purba Bardhaman district in the Indian state of West Bengal. Number of EMU and few Passenger trains stop at Baghnapara railway station.

== History ==
The Hooghly–Katwa Railway constructed a line from Bandel to Katwa in 1913. This line including Baghnapara railway station was electrified in 1994–96 with 25 kV overhead line.
