= Dhatrigram railway station =

Railway station in West Bengal, India

Dhatrigram
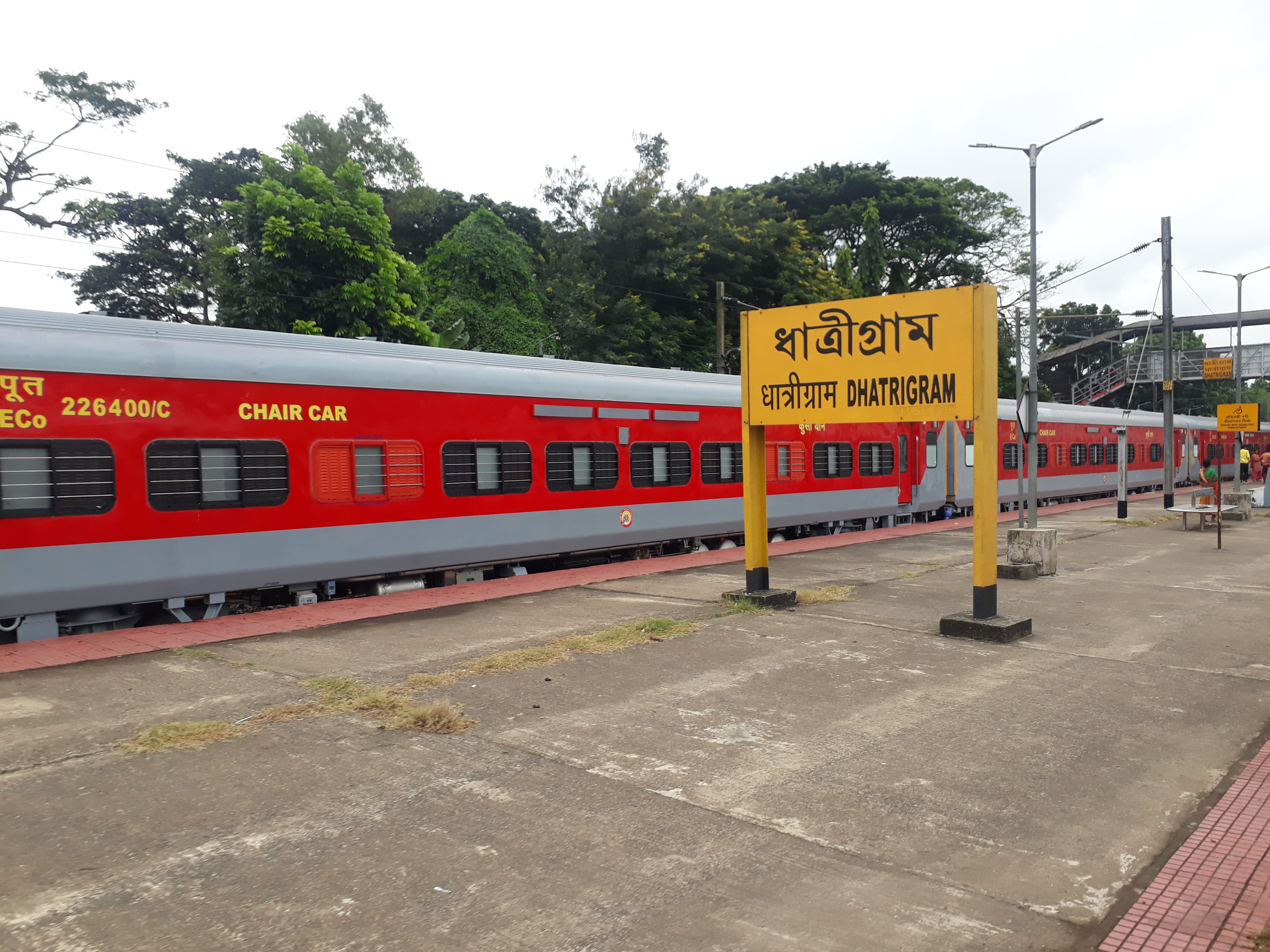

General information
- Location: Niralgachhi, Dhatrigram, Purba Bardhaman district, West Bengal; India
- Coordinates: 23.277974°N 88.311875°E
- Elevation: 16 m (52 ft)
- System: Indian Railways station and Kolkata Suburban Railway station
- Owner: Indian Railways
- Operator: Eastern Railway
- Platforms: 4
- Tracks: 4

Construction
- Structure type: Standard (on ground station)
- Parking: No
- Cycle facilities: No

Other information
- Status: Functioning
- Station code: DTAE
- Zone(s): Eastern Railway
- Division(s): Howrah

Services
Preceding station	Kolkata Suburban Railway	Following station
Baghnapara towards Howrah Junction	Eastern Line Bandel–Katwa line	Nandaigram Halt towards Katwa Junction
Route map
Location
- Location within West Bengal Location within India

Dhatrigram railway station is a railway station on Bandel–Katwa line connecting from Bandel to Katwa, and under the jurisdiction of Howrah railway division of Eastern Railway zone. It is situated at Niralgachhi, Dhatrigram, Purba Bardhaman district in the Indian state of West Bengal. Number of EMU and few Passenger trains stop at Dhatrigram railway station.

== History ==
The Hooghly–Katwa Railway constructed a line from Bandel to Katwa in 1913. This line including Dhatrigram railway station was electrified in 1994–96 with 25 kV overhead line.
