= Bhandartikuri railway station =

Railway station in West Bengal, India

Bhandartikuri
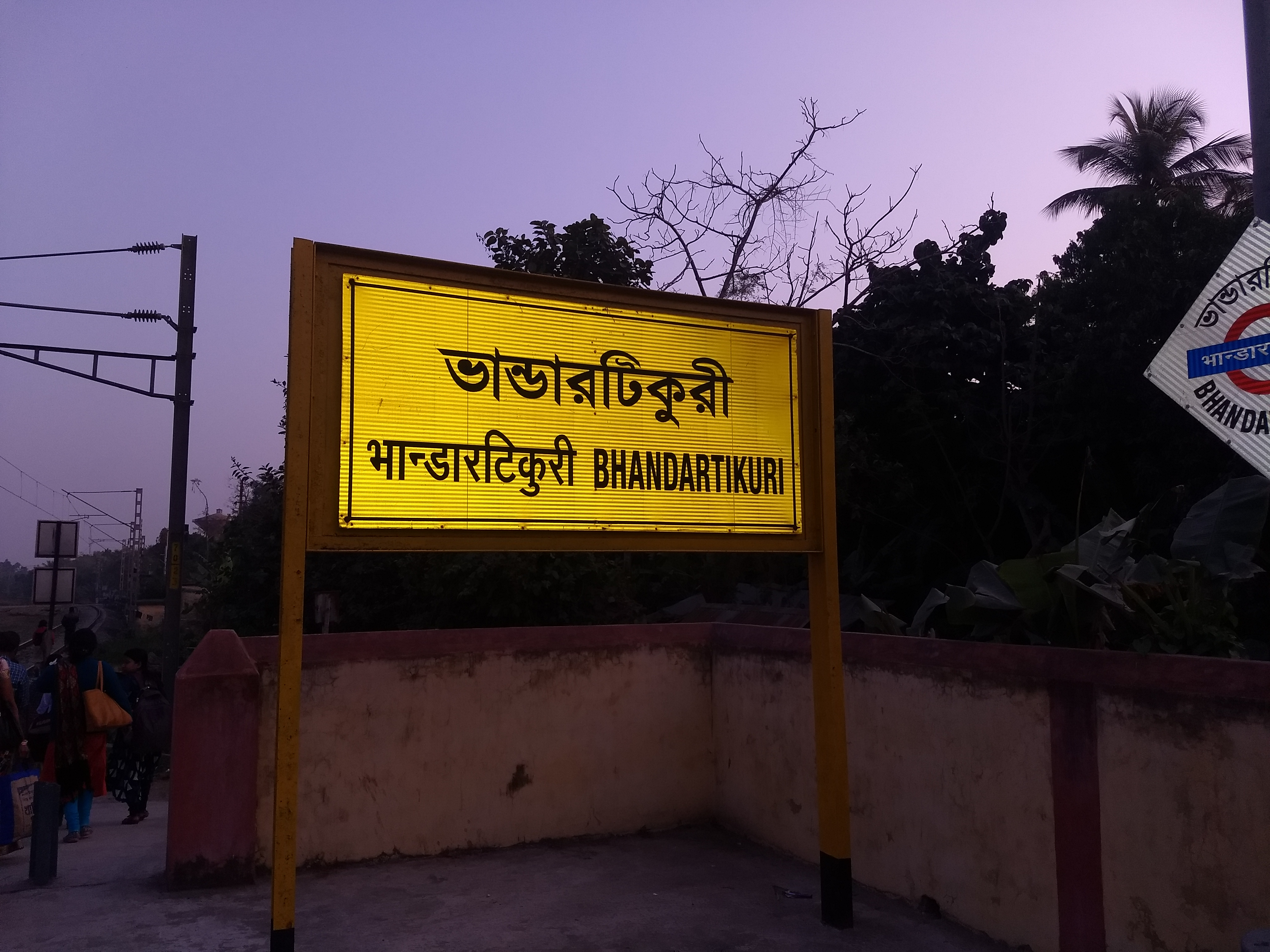
- Bhandartikuri railway station

General information
- Location: Bhandartikuri, Purba Bardhaman district, West Bengal; India
- Coordinates: 23.432950°N 88.329977°E
- Elevation: 21 m (69 ft)
- System: Indian Railways station and Kolkata Suburban Railway station
- Owner: Indian Railways
- Operator: Eastern Railway
- Platforms: 2
- Tracks: 2

Construction
- Structure type: Standard (on ground station)
- Parking: No
- Cycle facilities: No

Other information
- Status: Functioning
- Station code: BFZ
- Zone(s): Eastern Railway
- Division(s): Howrah

Services
Preceding station	Kolkata Suburban Railway	Following station
Bishnupriya towards Howrah Junction	Eastern Line Bandel–Katwa line	Purbasthali towards Katwa Junction
Route map
Location
- Location within West Bengal Location within India

Bhandartikuri railway station is a railway station on Bandel–Katwa line connecting from Bandel to Katwa, and under the jurisdiction of Howrah railway division of Eastern Railway zone. It is situated at Bhandartikuri village, Purba Bardhaman district in the Indian state of West Bengal. Few EMU and Passenger trains stop at Bhandartikuri railway station.

== History ==
The Hooghly–Katwa Railway constructed a line from Bandel to Katwa in 1913. This line including Bhandartikuri railway station was electrified in 1994–96 with 25 kV overhead line.
