= Majida =

- Village
- Location in West Bengal, India Majida (India)
- Coordinates: 23.5346°N 88.3214°E
- Country: India
- State: West Bengal
- District: Purba Bardhaman

Languages
  - Official: Bengali, English
- Time zone: UTC+5:30 (IST)
- PIN: 713512
- Website: bardhaman.gov.in

Majida is a village and Gram Panchayat in Purbasthali II CD block in Kalna subdivision of Purba Bardhaman district in West Bengal, India. Majida village is located approximately 14.2km from the sub-district headquarters of Purbasthali. Barddhaman is the district headquarter of Majida village.

== Geography ==
The nearest railway station located near the village is Belerhat railway station which is at distance of 82 kilometres from Bandel Junction. The nearest river located near the village is Bhagirathi which nearly forms the eastern boundary of the Purbasthali II community development block.

The nearest town located near the village is Patuli. Similarly, the town of Nabadwip is the closest location to Majida for significant economic activities, at a distance of around 22km.

== Demographics ==
As per the 2011 Census of India Majida had a total population of 9,267, of which 4,789 (52%) were males and 4,478 (48%) were females. Population below 6 years was 931. The total number of literates in Majida was 5,157 (61.86% of the population over 6 years), out of which 61.27% males and 49.64% females are literate. There are about 2,372 houses in majida village.

== Education ==
Majida Gana Bidya Bhaban. High School is a Bengali medium co-educational higher secondary school established in 1955.
