= Parulia (disambiguation) =

Parulia refers to a village in East Singhbum district in Jharkhand, India

Parulia may also refer to:

- Parulia, Bardhaman, a village in Purba Badhaman district, West Bengal, India
- Parulia, Diamond Harbour, a village in South 24 Parganas district, West Bengal, India

== See also ==
- Purulia, a city in West Bengal, India
  - Purulia district, covering the city
  - Purulia (Lok Sabha constituency), in the parliament of India
  - Purulia (Vidhan Sabha constituency), in the West Bengal Legislative Assembly
