= Belerhat railway station =

Railway station in West Bengal, India

Belerhat

General information
- Location: Jajneswarpur, Belerhat, Purba Bardhaman district, West Bengal; India
- Coordinates: 23.520985°N 88.283955°E
- Elevation: 19 m (62 ft)
- System: Kolkata Suburban Railway
- Owner: Indian Railways
- Operator: Eastern Railway
- Platforms: 2
- Tracks: 2

Construction
- Structure type: Standard (on ground station)
- Parking: No
- Cycle facilities: No

Other information
- Status: Functioning
- Station code: BQY
- Zone(s): Eastern Railway
- Division(s): Howrah

Services
Preceding station	Kolkata Suburban Railway	Following station
Lakshmipur towards Howrah Junction	Eastern Line Bandel–Katwa line	Patuli towards Katwa Junction
Route map
Location
- Location within West Bengal Location within India

Belerhat railway station is a railway station on Bandel–Katwa line connecting from Bandel to Katwa, and under the jurisdiction of Howrah railway division of Eastern Railway zone. It is situated at Jajneswarpur, Belerhat village of Purba Bardhaman district in the Indian state of West Bengal. It serves Majida and surrounding area. Few EMUs and passengers trains stop at Belerhat railway station. The station code for Belerhat railway station is BQY.

== History ==
The Hooghly–Katwa Railway constructed a line from Bandel to Katwa in 1913. This line including Belerhat railway station was electrified in 1994–96 with 25 kV overhead line.
