= Howrah–Malda Town Intercity Express (via Azimganj) =

Express train in India

Howrah Malda Town Intercity Express via Azimganj
Overview
- Service type: Express
- First service: 7 December 2007
- Current operator: Eastern Railways

Route
- Termini: Howrah Junction; Malda Town
- Stops: 13
- Distance travelled: 332 km (206 mi)
- Average journey time: 7 hours
- Service frequency: daily
- Train number: 13465 / 13466

On-board services
- Classes: AC Chair Car, Chair car, General
- Sleeping arrangements: Yes
- Catering facilities: No Pantry Car Coach attached

Technical
- Rolling stock: ICF coach
- Track gauge: 1,676 mm (5 ft 6 in)
- Operating speed: 140 km/h (87 mph) maximum,48 km/h (30 mph), including halts

Howrah Malda Town Intercity Express is an Express train belonging to Eastern Railway zone of Indian Railways that run between Howrah Junction and Malda Town in West Bengal state of India. This train comes under the Intercity Express category.

== Background ==
This train was inaugurated on 7 December 2007, flagged off by Lalu Prasad Yadav Former Minister of Railways for more connectivity between Kolkata and Malda Town.

== Service ==
This train covers the distance of 332 km with an average speed of 48 km/h on both sides.

== Routes ==
This train passes through Bandel Junction,Nabadwip Dham railway station,Katwa Junction, Azimganj Junction & New Farakka Junction on both sides.

== Traction ==
As the route of both side is fully electrified the end to end traction is now changed to AC traction that is ...The trains are now hauled by either WAP-4 or WAP-5 class loco of Indian Railway..
