= Dhatrigram =

Census town in West Bengal, India

- Census Town
- Location in West Bengal, India Dhatrigram (India)
- Coordinates: 23.2956°N 88.3134°E
- Country: India
- State: West Bengal
- District: Purba Bardhaman

Area
  - Total: 2.6 km^{2} (1.0 sq mi)

Population (2011)
  - Total: 9,951
  - Density: 3,800/km^{2} (9,900/sq mi)

Languages
  - Official: Bengali, English
- Time zone: UTC+5:30 (IST)
- PIN: 713405
- Vehicle registration: WB
- Website: purbabardhaman.gov.in

Dhatrigram is a census town in Kalna I CD Block in Kalna subdivision of Purba Bardhaman district in the state of West Bengal, India.

I have always known that usually some story of gods or kings is associated with it. However, it is now a prosperous village. In the past, it was connected to Kalna through the Bhagirathi Teer Waddel Road. In the village of Bhawanipur (Goswami Bari) adjacent to Dhatrigram, there was a Guru Bari of Raja Tej Chandra and this Guru family still resides there. In their family, the very ancient Radha Ballabh Thakur of that period is worshipped.[1]

Sri Sukumar Sen says that Dhaigaon (Dharya Gram) was the sub-capital of Lakshmana Sen ('Upkarika' - a Kachari house in the language of the present-day zamindari). On the other hand, according to Zakaria Saheb, Dharya Gram was a Jayaskandhabar. And this Jayaskandhabar means an army camp. Now if Upkarika is a sub-capital, then Upkarika and Jayaskandhabar have roughly the same meaning.

But the question arises here that is Dharyagram Dhatrigram (Dhaigaon)?

It is known from the Madhai Nagar copperplate inscription that on the 27th day of the month of Shravan (11 August 1203 AD), while staying near a place called Dharyagram, Maharaja Lakshana Sen donated land to a Brahmin named Govinda Devvarma on the occasion of the 'Aindri Mahashanti' ceremony at a place called 'Dharyagram' near 'Pundrabardhana Bhukti', 'Kantapur' within 'Barendra Bhoomi'. In this case, it is seen that he stayed near a place called 'Dharyagram', but not in Dharyagram.

Now it can be said that where Dharyagram is not Dhatrigram (Dhaigaon), “Dhatrigram has been transformed from Dhatrigram to Dhaigaon or a corruption of Dhatrigram” – this opinion of Dr. Sukumar Sen becomes baseless.

Now the question is, Goddess Jagaddhatri is established in this village, but is the village named Dhatrigram after her name?

Actually, it was a village of Dhatri-Dai. In this sense, the place was named Dhatrigram (Dhaigaon). This seems more reasonable. Again, a recent researcher has removed the meaning of the word ‘Dhatri’ from ‘Bahera=Boyara’ and found that the place was a forest of ‘Bahera’ trees, in this sense, the name of this place was Dhatrigram. He has tried to establish this opinion.

== History ==
Dhatrigram responded warmly to the movement against partition of Bengal in 1905. Many people in the town had close links with Kolkata and the liberal trend then affecting the metropolis flowed into this small town for many years.

== Geography ==
Cities and towns in the Kalna subdivision of Purba Bardhaman district
M: municipal city/ town, CT: census town, R: rural/ urban centre, H: historical/ religious centre, C: craft centre.
Owing to space constraints in the small map, the actual locations in a larger map may vary slightly

=== Location ===
Dhatrigram is located on the agriculturally rich alluvial plains between the Bhagirathi, Ajay and Damodar rivers. Temperatures in this region varies from 17 to 18 °C in winter to 30-42 °C in summer.

=== Urbanisation ===
87.00% of the population of Kalna subdivision live in the rural areas. Only 13.00% of the population live in the urban areas. The map alongside presents some of the notable locations in the subdivision. All places marked in the map are linked in the larger full screen map.

== Demographics ==
As per the 2011 Census of India Dhatrigram had a total population of 9,951, of which 5,137 (52%) were males and 4,814 (48%) were females. Population below 6 years was 826. The total number of literates in Dhatrigram was 7,704 (84.43% of the population over 6 years).

As of 2001 India census, Dhatrigram had a population of 9,609. Males constitute 52% of the population and females 48%. Dhatrigram has an average literacy rate of 68%, higher than the national average of 59.5%: male literacy is 76% and, female literacy is 60%. In Dhatrigram, 11% of the population is under 6 years of age.

== Economy ==
It is a weaving centre with a name for cotton and silk saris.

About 32,00,000 people commute daily from around the city to Kolkata. Thirty-eight trains transport commuters from 45 stations in the Howrah-Katwa section.

== Infrastructure ==
As per the District Census Handbook 2011, Dhatrigram covered an area of 2.6 km^{2}. It had 1.2 km roads. Amongst the medical facilities, the nearest nursing home was 7 km away and the nearest veterinary hospital was 7 km away. It had 2 primary schools. The nearest secondary school was 1.5 km away at Gram Kalna and the nearest senior secondary school was 13 km away at Kalna.

== Transport ==
Dhatrigram railway station is 91 km from Howrah and situated on the Bandel-Katwa Branch Line.

== Education ==
Dhatrigram has many primary and two higher secondary schools

1. Dhatrigram High School
2. Dhatrigram Balika Vidyalaya
3. Gramkalna High School.

== Culture ==
Saraswati & Jagatdhatri Puja is celebrated in Dhatigram and many cultural programmes are held during this occasion.
