= Kuntighat =

Kuntighat Nityanandapur
- village
- Country: India
- State: West Bengal
- District: Hooghly

Languages
  - Official: Bengali, English
- Time zone: UTC+5:30 (IST)
- PIN: 712513
- Telephone code: 033-2684, 03213-229
- Vehicle registration: WB-16-18
- Nearest city: Chinsurah
- Literacy: 80%
- Lok Sabha constituency: Hooghly
- Climate: Moderate (Köppen)

Kuntighat is a village in Hooghly district, West Bengal, India located on the banks of river Kunti.

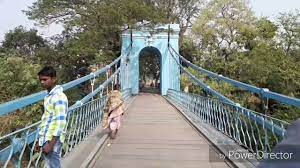

The main means of communication in this village is Sarak Path (Assam Road) and Rail Path (Kuntighat Railway). The village is situated on the banks of the river Ganga and 5 km away from the city of Tribeni. It is an old sacred place for Hindus, whose sanctity has been recognized for many centuries and a Sanskrit part of the last quarter of the 12th century is mentioned in Pavandut. Schools include Bishpara high school, Chandrahati Dilip kumar high school and Gopalpur high school It has also a few beautiful places to visit, like Kuntighat wooden hanging bridge, Birla Mandir, Gopalpur Lock Gate etc.
