= Lakshmipur railway station =

Railway Station in West Bengal, India

Lakshmipur লক্ষ্মীপুর

General information
- Location: Ukhra, Lakshmipur, Purba Bardhaman district, West Bengal; India
- Coordinates: 23.503257°N 88.302841°E
- Elevation: 14 m (46 ft)
- System: Indian Railways station and Kolkata Suburban Railway station
- Owner: Indian Railways
- Operator: Eastern Railway
- Platforms: 2
- Tracks: 2

Construction
- Structure type: Standard (on ground station)
- Parking: No
- Cycle facilities: No

Other information
- Status: Functioning
- Station code: LKX
- Zone(s): Eastern Railway
- Division(s): Howrah

Services
Preceding station	Kolkata Suburban Railway	Following station
Mertala Phaleya towards Howrah Junction	Eastern Line Bandel–Katwa line	Belerhat towards Katwa Junction
Route map
Location
- Location within West Bengal Location within India

Lakshmipur railway station is a railway station on Bandel–Katwa line connecting from Bandel to Katwa, and under the jurisdiction of Howrah railway division of Eastern Railway zone. It is situated at Ukhra, Lakshmipur village, Purba Bardhaman district in the Indian state of West Bengal. 38 EMU local train halt at this station, 19 each for UP and Down bound trains in the Bandel-Katwa line while 3 passenger/express trains halt at Lakshmipur railway station. Lakshmipur is located 117 km from Howrah while 25 km from Katwa Junction

== History ==
The Hooghly–Katwa Railway constructed a line from Bandel to Katwa in 1913. This line including Lakshmipur railway station was electrified in 1994–96 with 25 kV overhead line. The tracks were doubled with dedicated lines for up and down bound trains in 2014-15
