= Ambika Kalna railway station =

Railway station in West Bengal, India

Ambika Kalna
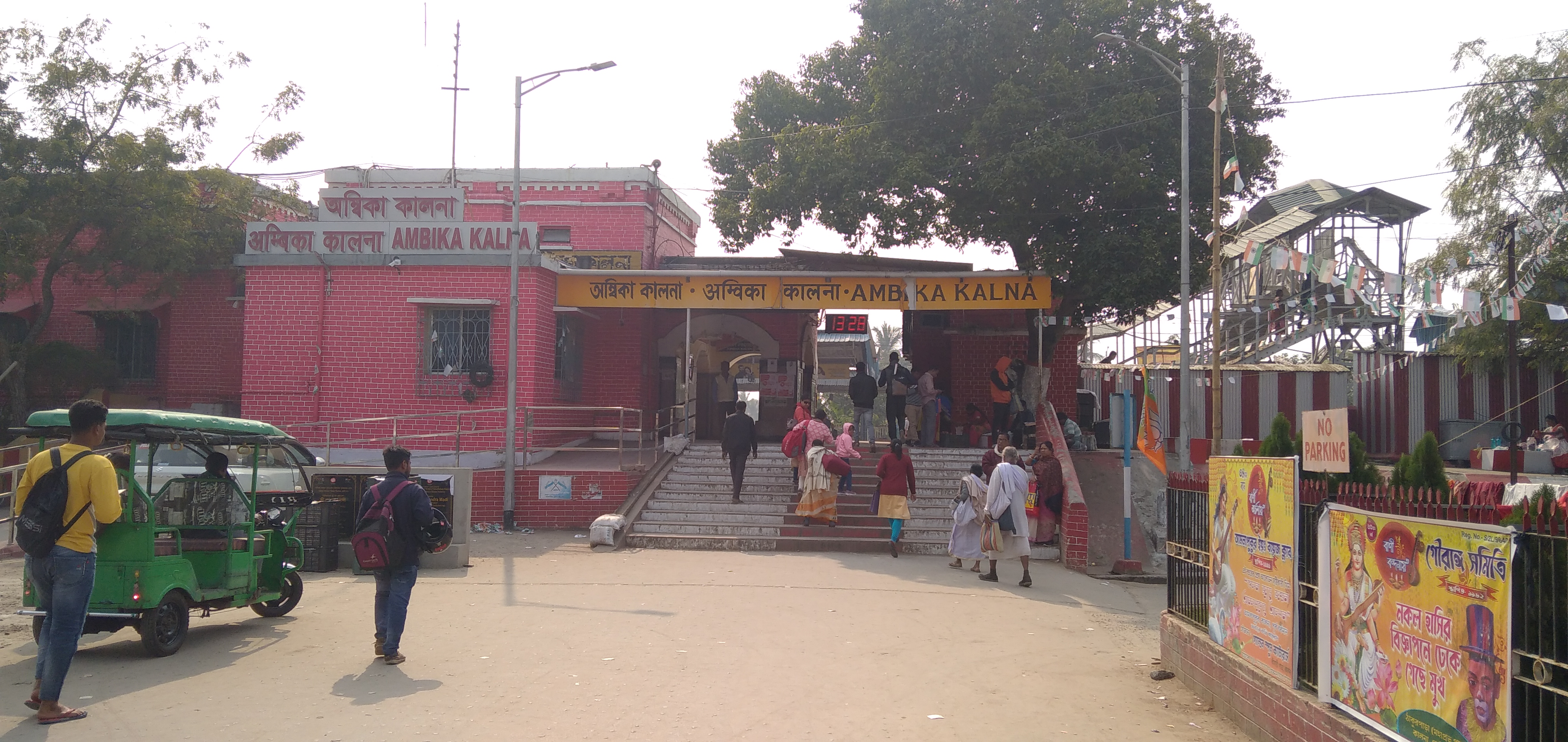
- Ambika Kalna railway station

General information
- Location: State Highway 6, Kalna, Purba Bardhaman district, West Bengal; India
- Coordinates: 23.213366°N 88.352994°E
- Elevation: 13 m (43 ft)
- System: Kolkata Suburban Railway
- Owner: Indian Railways
- Operator: Eastern Railway
- Platforms: 4
- Tracks: 2

Construction
- Structure type: At grade
- Parking: No
- Cycle facilities: No

Other information
- Status: Functioning
- Station code: ABKA
- Zone(s): Eastern Railway
- Division(s): Howrah

Services
Preceding station	Kolkata Suburban Railway	Following station
Guptipara towards Howrah Junction	Eastern Line Bandel–Katwa line	Baghnapara towards Katwa Junction
Route map
Location
- Location within West Bengal Location within India

Ambika Kalna railway station is a railway station on Bandel–Katwa line connecting from Bandel to Katwa, and under the jurisdiction of Howrah railway division of Eastern Railway zone. It is situated beside State Highway 6 at Kalna, Purba Bardhaman district in the Indian state of West Bengal. Total 56 trains including EMU, Express and Passenger trains stop at Ambika kalna railway station.

== History ==
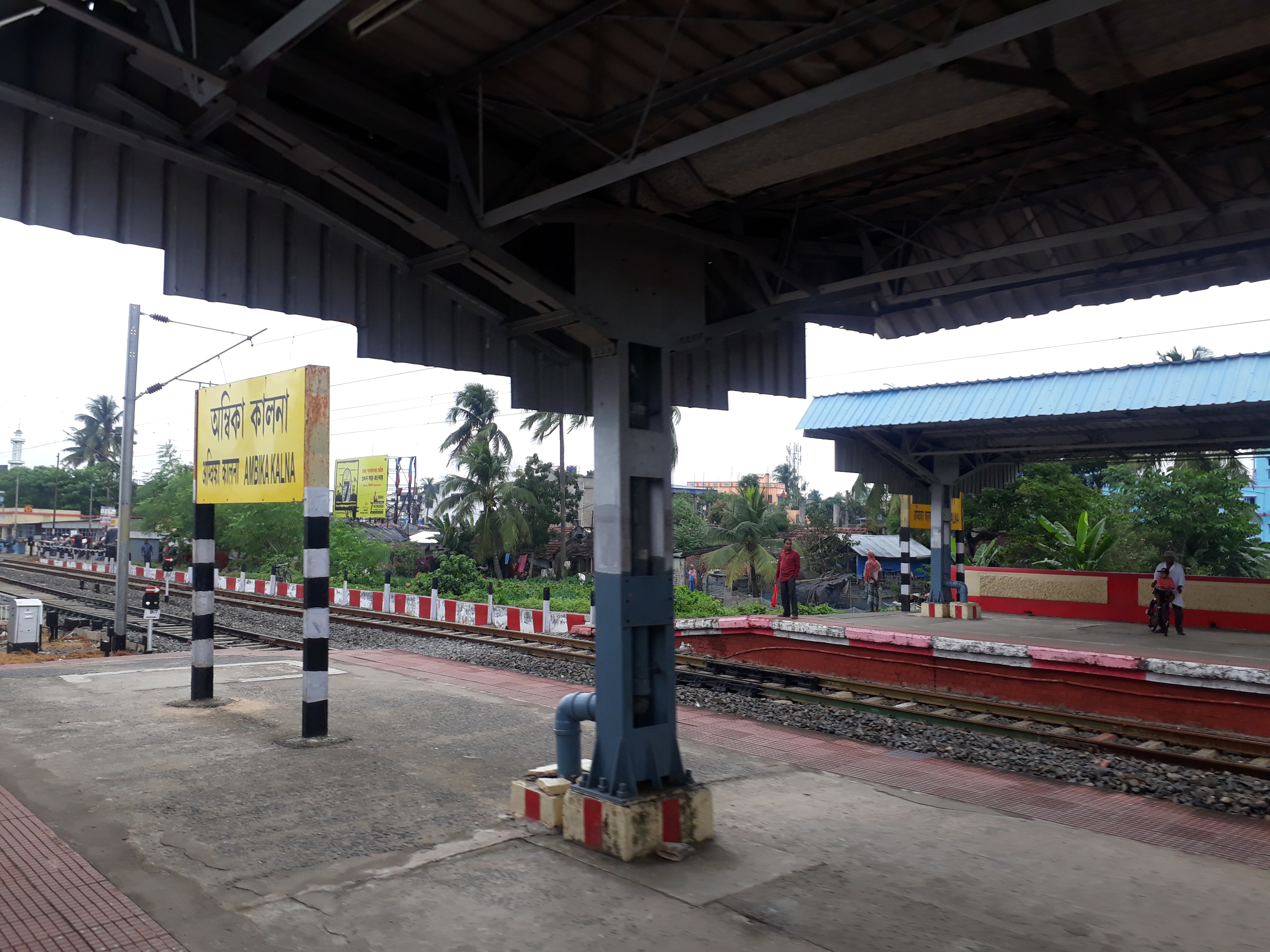
Ambika Kalna railway station at Kalna

The Hooghly–Katwa Railway constructed a line from Bandel to Katwa in 1913. This line including Ambika Kalna railway station was electrified in 1994–96 with 25 kV overhead line.
