= Nabadwip Ghat =

Nabadwip Ghat (popularly known as Swarupganj) is a village and former narrow gauge railway station in Nadia district in the Indian state of West Bengal. It is located 14 kilometres (8.7 mi) from Krishnanagar, District headquarters. The village situated on the banks of the Bhagirathi River and just on the opposite side of the river is Nabadwip town.

== Transport ==
This was the terminal railway station of Shantipur-Nabadwip Ghat route Narrow-gauge railway tracks. At present the Narrow Gauge route is abandoned and Broad Gauge Tracks are laid till amghata railway station and not beyond it. Bus services are available towards Krishnanagar from the locality. Nabadwip is connected through ferry service to Nabadwip ghat or Maheshganj.
