= Patuli =

- Village
- Location in West Bengal, India Patuli (India)
- Coordinates: 23.5686°N 88.2877°E
- Country: India
- State: West Bengal
- District: Purba Bardhaman
- Elevation: 18 m (59 ft)

Population (2011)
  - Total: 4,681

Languages
  - Official: Bengali, English
- Time zone: UTC+5:30 (IST)
- PIN: 713512
- Vehicle registration: WB
- Website: purbabardhaman.gov.in

Patuli is a village under Purbasthali police station of Kalna subdivision in Purba Bardhaman district in the Indian state of West Bengal.

== History ==
Patuli was the centre of an old Hindu kingdom, which fell to the advancing Turkish forces. Subsequently, Lord Clive passed through Patuli and Katwa with his forces on his way to Palashi in 1757.

== Geography ==
Cities and towns in the Kalna subdivision of Purba Bardhaman district
M: municipal city/ town, CT: census town, R: rural/ urban centre, H: historical/ religious centre, C: craft centre.
Owing to space constraints in the small map, the actual locations in a larger map may vary slightly

=== Location ===
Patuli is located at 23.5686°N 88.2877°E. It has an average elevation of 18 metres (59 feet).

Patuli is located between the Bhagirathi, Ajay and Damodar rivers. Temperatures in this region vary from 17-18 °C in winter to 30-32 °C in summer.

=== CD block HQ ===
The headquarters of Purbasthali II CD block are located at Patuli.

=== Urbanisation ===
87.00% of the population of Kalna subdivision live in the rural areas. Only 13.00% of the population live in the urban areas. The map alongside presents some of the notable locations in the subdivision. All places marked in the map are linked in the larger full screen map.

== Demographics ==
As per the 2011 Census of India, Patuli had a total population of 4,681 of which 2,391 (51%) were males and 2,290 (49%) were females. Population below 6 years was 389. The total number of literates in Patuli was 3,235 (75.37% of the population over 6 years).

As of 2001 India census, Patuli had a population of 4,451. Males constitute 51% of the population and females 49%. Patuli has an average literacy rate of 64%, higher than the national average of 59.5%: male literacy is 69%, and female literacy is 60%. In Patuli, 10% of the population is under 6 years of age.

== Economy ==
About 32,00,000 people commute daily from around the city to Kolkata. Thirty-eight trains transport commuters from 45 stations in the Howrah-Katwa section.

== Transport ==
Patuli railway station is 127 km from Howrah on the Bandel-Katwa Branch Line.

== Education ==
In olden days Patuli had traditional Sanskrit tol. The name of Patuli High School is present in the survey of schools made in 1909-10. This was established by Gour Mohon Bhattacharjee, a graduate from the then Duff College (later Scottish Church College). Gour Mohan Bhattacharjee, the founder-headmaster of Patuli High School was a student of M.A.(Botany) at the University of Calcutta. He could however, not complete the course due to a conflict with an English professor. During his time, M.Sc. courses had not been introduced by the university, and all subjects were grouped under the arts.

Patuli has two primary, one secondary and one higher secondary schools.

== Healthcare ==
There is a primary health centre at Patuli (with 10 beds).
