= Link Air Express =

Italian-based cargo airline

IATA	ICAO	Call sign
6M	LKX	MUTTLEY
- Founded: 2006
- Ceased operations: 2008
- Hubs: Linate Airport
- Headquarters: Milan, Italy

Link Air Express was a cargo airline based in Peschiera Borromeo, Milan, Italy. It is an all-cargo airline operating domestic scheduled services. Its main base is Linate Airport, Milan.

== History ==
The airline started operations in April 2006 and has 10 employees (at March 2007).

== Destinations ==
Link Air Express operates services to the following destinations (at June 2007):

- Milan
- Cagliari
- Catania
- Baden, Germany

== Fleet ==
The Link Air Express included the following aircraft at March 2007:

- 2 − ATR 42-300F

The first two ATR 42 aircraft were with the airline from 3 April 2006 and a third ATR 42 was expected in June 2006.

== See also ==
- List of defunct airlines of Italy
