= Purbasthali II =

- Community development block
- Location in West Bengal
- Coordinates: 23°33′N 88°15′E
- Country: India
- State: West Bengal
- District: Purba Bardhaman
- Parliamentary constituency: Bardhaman Purba
- Assembly constituency: Purbasthali Uttar

Area
  - Total: 74.31 sq mi (192.47 km^{2})

Population (2011)
  - Total: 212,355
  - Density: 2,857.6/sq mi (1,103.3/km^{2})
- Time zone: UTC+5.30 (IST)
- PIN: 713512 (Patuli)
- Telephone/STD code: 03474
- Vehicle registration: WB-37,WB-38,WB-41,WB-42,WB-44
- Literacy Rate: 70.35 per cent
- Website: http://purbabardhaman.gov.in/

Purbasthali II is a community development block that forms an administrative division in Kalna subdivision of Purba Bardhaman district in the Indian state of West Bengal.

== Geography ==
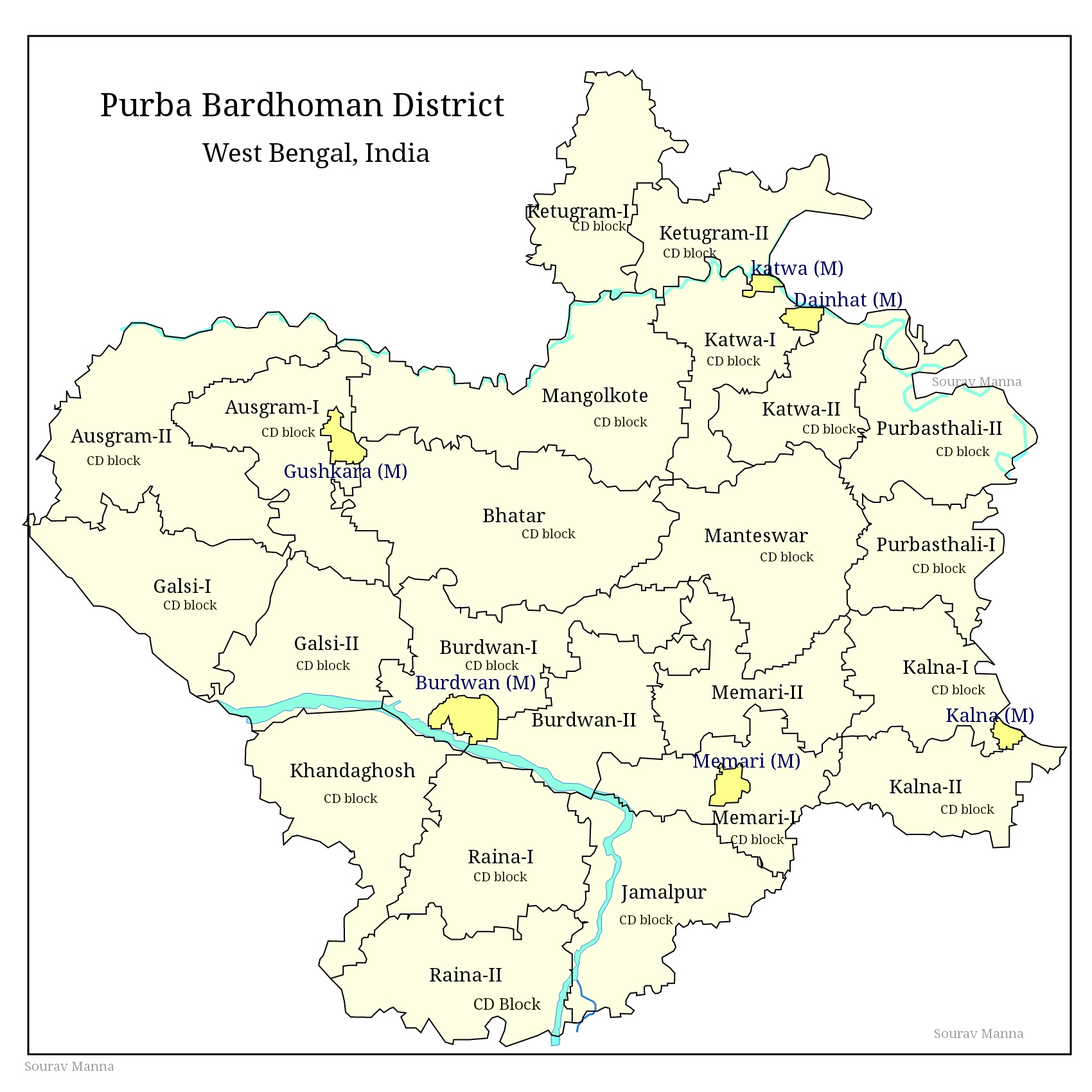
CD blocks of Purba Bardhaman district

Patuli, a constituent gram panchayat of Purbasthali II CD Block, is located at 23°33′N 88°15′E.

Purbasthali II CD Block is part of the Bhagirathi basin. The Bhagirathi forms the eastern boundary of the CD Block. The region has many swamps and water-logged areas. The soil is fertile, as it consists mainly of silt deposits.

Purbasthali II CD Block is bounded by Nakashipara CD Block, in Nadia district across the Bhagirathi, on the north, Krishnanagar II and Nabadwip CD Blocks, in Nadia district across the Bhagirathi, on the east, Purbasthali I CD Block on the south and Katwa II and Manteswar CD Blocks on the west.

Purbasthali II CD Block has an area of 192.47 km^{2}. It has 1 panchayat samity, 10 gram panchayats, 156 gram sansads (village councils), 89 mouzas and 88 inhabited villages. Nadanghat and Purbasthali police stations serve this block. Headquarters of this CD Block is at Patuli.

Gram panchayats of Purbasthali II block/panchayat samiti are: Jhawdanga, Kalekhantola I, Kalekhantola II, Majida, Mertala, Mukshimpara, Nimdaha, Patuli, Pilla and Purbasthali.

== Demographics ==
=== Population ===
As per the 2011 Census of India Purbasthali II CD Block had a total population of 212,355, all of which were rural. There were 109,442 (52%) males and 102,913 (48%) females. Population below 6 years was 23,091. Scheduled Castes numbered 55,456 (26.11%) and Scheduled Tribes numbered 7,920 (3.73%).

As per 2001 census, Purbasthali II block had a total population of 188,149, out of which 97,024 were males and 91,125 were females. Purbasthali II block registered a population growth of 18.89 per cent during the 1991-2001 decade. Decadal growth for Bardhaman district was 14.36 per cent. Decadal growth in West Bengal was 17.84 per cent. Scheduled castes at 55,528 formed around one-fourth the population. Scheduled tribes numbered 6,459.

Large villages (with 4,000+ population) in Purbasthali II CD Block are (2011 census figures in brackets): Purbasthali (4,207), Krishnabati (4,186), Chhatni (4,415), Uttar Shrirampur (4,187), Patuli (4,681), Majida (9,267), Uttar Lakshmipur (4,697), Sinhari (6,911), Ukhra (5,011), Nimdaha (6,873), Biswarambha (6,169), Hrishi (4,967), Falea (6,944), Kashthasali (4,343), Chupi (7,159), Palaspuli (4,642) and Parulia (6,447).

Other villages in Purbasthali II CD Block include (2011 census figures in brackets): Muksimpara (823), Mertala (3,046) and Jhauadanga (2,842).

=== Literacy ===
As per the 2011 census the total number of literates in Purbasthali II CD Block was 133,138 (70.35% of the population over 6 years) out of which males numbered 73,913 (75.64% of the male population over 6 years) and females numbered 59,225 (64.70% of the female population over 6 years). The gender disparity (the difference between female and male literacy rates) was 10.94%.

As per 2001 census, Purbasthali II block had a total literacy of 64.50 per cent for the 6+ age group. While male literacy was 72.38 per cent female literacy was 56.07 per cent. Bardhaman district had a total literacy of 70.18 per cent, male literacy being 78.63 per cent and female literacy being 60.95 per cent.

See also – List of West Bengal districts ranked by literacy rate

Literacy in CD blocks of
Bardhaman district
Bardhaman Sadar North subdivision
Ausgram I – 69.39%
Ausgram II – 68.00%
Bhatar – 71.56%
Burdwan I – 76.07%
Burdwan II – 74.12%
Galsi II – 70.05%
Bardhaman Sadar South subdivision
Khandaghosh – 77.28%
Raina I – 80.20%
Raina II – 81.48%
Jamalpur – 74.08%
Memari I – 74.10%
Memari II – 74.59%
Kalna subdivision
Kalna I – 75.81%
Kalna II – 76.25%
Manteswar – 73.08%
Purbasthali I – 77.59%
Purbasthali II – 70.35%
Katwa subdivision
Katwa I – 70.36%
Katwa II – 69.16%
Ketugram I – 68.00%
Ketugram II – 65.96%
Mongalkote – 67.97%
Durgapur subdivision
Andal – 77.25%
Faridpur Durgapur – 74.14%
Galsi I – 72.81%
Kanksa – 76.34%
Pandabeswar – 73.01%
Asansol subdivision
Barabani – 69.58%
Jamuria – 69.42%
Raniganj – 73.86%
Salanpur – 78.76%
2011 Census: CD Block Wise

Primary Census Abstract Data

=== Languages and religion ===
Religion in Purbasthali II CD block (2011)
Hinduism	68.06%
Islam	31.60%
Other or not stated	0.34%

In the 2011 census Hindus numbered 145,531 and formed 68.06% of the population in Purbasthali II CD Block. Muslims numbered 67,110 and formed 31.60% of the population. Christians numbered 275 and formed 0.13% of the population. Others numbered 439 and formed 0.21% of the population.

In Bardhaman district the percentage of Hindu population has been declining from 84.3% in 1961 to 77.9% in 2011 and the percentage of Muslim population has increased from 15.2% in 1961 to 20.7% in 2011.

Languages of Purbasthali II CD block (2011)
1. Bengali (98.5%)
2. Santali (0.90%)
3. Others (0.57%)

At the time of the 2011 census, 98.53% of the population spoke Bengali and 0.90% Santali as their first language.

== Rural poverty ==
As per poverty estimates obtained from household survey for families living below poverty line in 2005, rural poverty in Purbasthali II CD Block was 42.76%.

== Economy ==
=== Livelihood ===
In Purbasthali II CD Block in 2011, amongst the class of total workers, cultivators formed 17.35%, agricultural labourers 44.48%, household industry workers 11.73% and other workers 26.44%.

Purbasthali II CD Block is part of the area where agriculture dominates the scenario but the secondary and tertiary sectors have shown an increasing trend.

=== Infrastructure ===
There are 88 inhabited villages in Purbasthali II CD block. All 88 villages (100%) have power supply. 87 villages (98.86%) have drinking water supply. 22 villages (25.00%) have post offices. 84 villages (94.45%) have telephones (including landlines, public call offices and mobile phones). 43 villages (48.86%) have a pucca (paved) approach road and 27 villages (30.68%) have transport communication (includes bus service, rail facility and navigable waterways). 21 villages (23.86%) have agricultural credit societies. 14 villages (15.91%) have banks.

In 2013-14, there were 92 fertiliser depots, 23 seed store and 51 fair price shops in the CD Block.

=== Agriculture ===
Persons engaged in agriculture
in Purbasthali II CD Block
1. Bargadars (3.95%)
2. Patta holders (13.7%)
3. Small farmers (5.73%)
4. Marginal farmers (19.1%)
5. Agricultural labourers (57.5%)

Although the Bargadari Act of 1950 recognised the rights of bargadars to a higher share of crops from the land that they tilled, it was not implemented fully. Large tracts, beyond the prescribed limit of land ceiling, remained with the rich landlords. From 1977 onwards major land reforms took place in West Bengal. Land in excess of land ceiling was acquired and distributed amongst the peasants. Following land reforms land ownership pattern has undergone transformation. In 2013-14, persons engaged in agriculture in Purbasthali II CD Block could be classified as follows: bargadars 3.95%, patta (document) holders 13.67%, small farmers (possessing land between 1 and 2 hectares) 5.73%, marginal farmers (possessing land up to 1 hectare) 19.12% and agricultural labourers 57.53%.

In 2003-04 net cropped area in Purbasthali II CD Block was 15,558 hectares and the area in which more than one crop was grown was 10,890 hectares.

In 2013-14, Purbasthali II CD Block produced 25,887 tonnes of Aman paddy, the main winter crop from 8,353 hectares, 1,354 tonnes of Aus paddy (summer crop) from 485 hectares, 15,459 tonnes of Boro paddy (spring crop) from 4,507 hectares, 139 tonnes of wheat from 45 hectares, 104,835 tonnes of jute from 4,985 hectares and 2,774 tonnes of potatoes from 258 hectares. It also produced pulses and oilseeds.

In 2013-14, the total area irrigated in Purbasthali II CD Block was 1,859.55 hectares, out of which 925.60 hectares were irrigated by river lift irrigation and 933.95 hectares by deep tube wells.

=== Banking ===
In 2013-14, Purbasthali II CD Block had offices of 6 commercial banks and 2 gramin banks.

== Transport ==
Purbasthali II CD Block has 7 ferry services and 8 originating/ terminating bus routes.

The Bandel-Katwa branch line passes through this CD Block and there is the Purbasthali railway station at Purbasthali.

State Highway 6 (West Bengal) running from Rajnagar (in Birbhum district) to Alampur (in Howrah district) passes through this block.

== Education ==
In 2013-14, Purbasthali II CD Block had 121 primary schools with 11,084 students, 10 middle schools with 9,698 students, 11 high school with 8,132 students and 9 higher secondary schools with 12,214 students. Purbasthali II CD Block had 1 general college with 1,343 and 323 institutions for special and non-formal education with 14,057 students

As per the 2011 census, in Purbasthali II CD block, amongst the 88 inhabited villages, all villages had schools, 25 villages had two or more primary schools, 21 villages had at least 1 primary and 1 middle school and 15 villages had at least 1 middle and 1 secondary school.

More than 6,000 schools (in erstwhile Bardhaman district) serve cooked midday meal to more than 900,000 students.

Purbasthali College was established at Parulia in 2009.

== Healthcare ==
In 2014, Purbasthali II CD Block had 1 block primary health centre and 4 primary health centres with total 37 beds and 5 doctors (excluding private bodies). It had 26 family welfare subcentres. 3,665 patients were treated indoor and 265,684 patients were treated outdoor in the hospitals, health centres and subcentres of the CD Block.

Purbasthali Rural Hospital at Purbasthali (with 30 beds) is the main medical facility in Purbasthali II CD block. There are primary health centres at Kubajpur, PO Rai Dogachhia (with 4 beds), Nimdah, PO Belerhat (with 6 beds), Patuli (with 10 beds) and Singari, PO Laxmipur (with 10 beds).

Purbasthali II CD Block is one of the areas of Bardhaman district which is affected by high levels of arsenic contamination of ground water.
