= Parulia, Bardhaman =

Parulia
- Village
- Location in West Bengal, India Parulia (India)
- Coordinates: 23.4493°N 88.3137°E
- Country: India
- State: West Bengal
- District: Purba Bardhaman

Population (2011)
  - Total: 6,447

Languages
  - Official: Bengali, English
- Time zone: UTC+5:30 (IST)
- Telephone/STD code: 03474
- Lok Sabha constituency: Bardhaman Purba
- Vidhan Sabha constituency: Purbasthali Uttar
- Website: bardhaman.gov.in

Parulia is a village in Purbasthali II CD block in Kalna subdivision of Purba Bardhaman district in the state of West Bengal, India.

== Geography ==
Cities and towns in the Kalna subdivision of Purba Bardhaman district
M: municipal city/ town, CT: census town, R: rural/ urban centre, H: historical/ religious centre.
Owing to space constraints in the small map, the actual locations in a larger map may vary slightly

=== Location ===
Parulia is located at 23.4493°N 88.3137°E.

=== Urbanisation ===
87.00% of the population of Kalna subdivision live in the rural areas. Only 13.00% of the population live in the urban areas. The map alongside presents some of the notable locations in the subdivision. All places marked in the map are linked in the larger full screen map.

== Demographics ==
As per the 2011 Census of India Parulia had a total population of 6,447 of which 3,328 (52%) were males and 3,118 (48%) were females. Population below 6 years was 585. The total number of literates in Parulia was 4,940 (84.27% of the population over 6 years).

== Transport ==
The State Highway 6 (West Bengal), running from Rajnagar (in Birbhum district) to Alampur (in Howrah district), passes through Parulia.

== Education ==
Purbasthali College was established at Parulia in 2009. It offers honours courses in Bengali, Sanskrit, education, history and philosophy.
