= Nabadwip Dham railway station =

Railway station in West Bengal, India

Nabadwip Dham
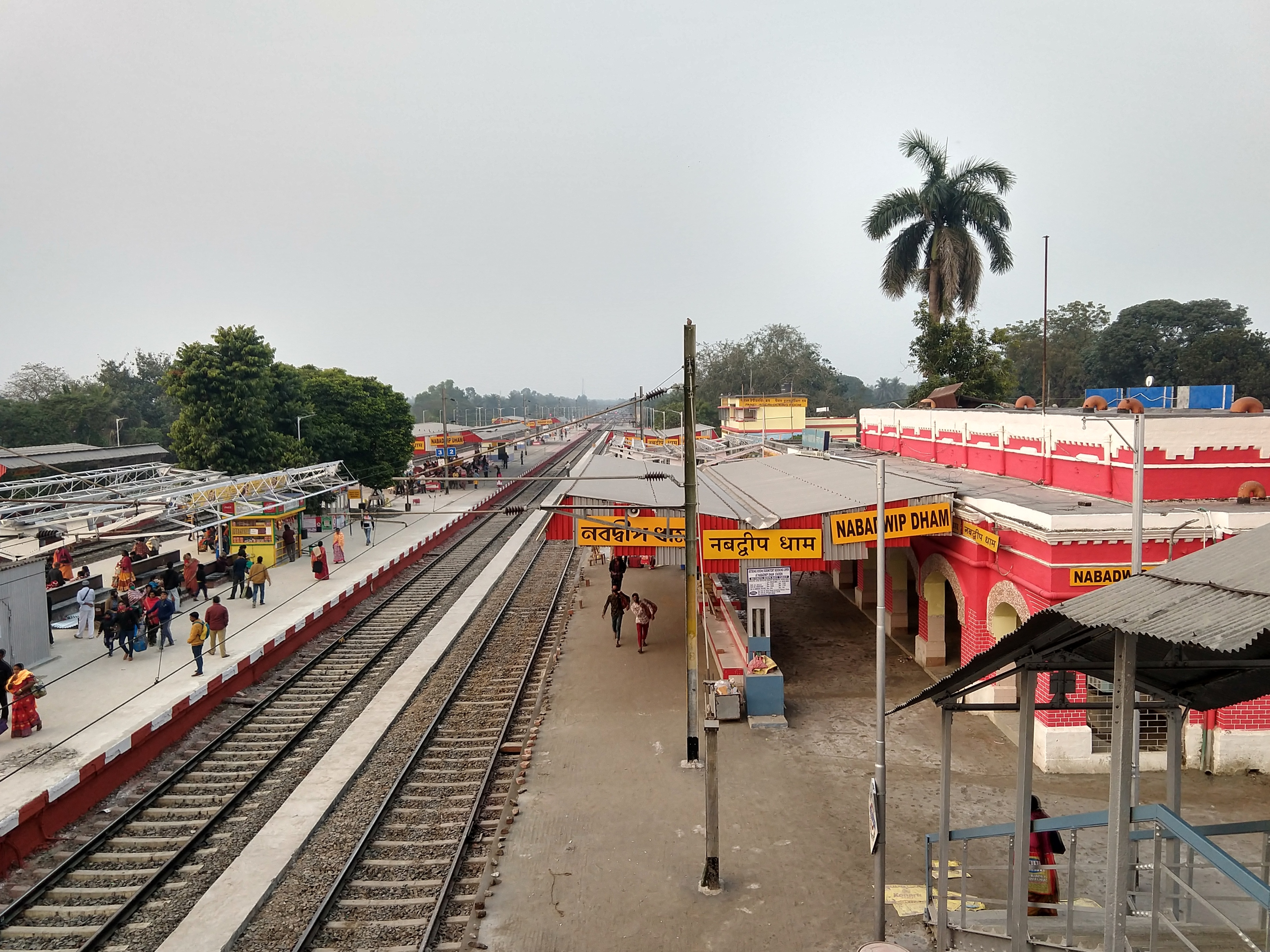
- Nabadwip Dham station

General information
- Location: Station Road, Nabadwip, West Bengal; India
- Coordinates: 23.397920°N 88.356702°E
- Elevation: 16 metres (52 ft)
- System: Kolkata Suburban Railway station
- Owner: Indian Railways
- Operator: Eastern Railway
- Lines: Howrah-NJP Loop Line; Bandel–Katwa line; Proposed & planned connection to Krishnanagar via Nabadwip Ghat
- Platforms: 4
- Tracks: 2
- Connections: Nabadwip Bus Stand; Nabadwip Ferry Ghat

Construction
- Structure type: At grade
- Parking: Available
- Cycle facilities: Yes

Other information
- Status: Functioning
- Station code: NDAE
- Zone(s): Eastern Railway
- Division(s): Howrah

History
- Opened: 1913
- Electrified: 31 March 1996; 30 years ago
- Former names: East Indian Railway Company

Services
Preceding station	Kolkata Suburban Railway	Following station
Kalinagar towards Howrah Junction	Eastern Line Bandel–Katwa line	Bishnupriya towards Katwa Junction
Route map
Location
- Location within West Bengal Location within India

Nabadwip Dham railway station is a railway station on Bandel–Nabadwip–Katwa line connecting from Bandel to Katwa, and under the jurisdiction of Howrah railway division of Eastern Railway zone. This is the main railway station of Nabadwip city of Nadia district in the state of West Bengal. It is situated beside State Highway 8, connecting Nabadwip and Krishnanagar through Gouranga Bridge. It serves Nabadwip and the surrounding areas. Almost all EMU and Passenger trains stop at Nabadwip railway station. The distance between Howrah and Nabadwip railway station is approximately 103 km. It has 16th longest railway platform in world 720 m (2,362 ft).

== History ==
In 1913, the Hooghly–Katwa Railway constructed a line from Bandel to Katwa. This line was electrified in 1996 with 25 kV overhead line. A project involves doubling the line of length 22 km between Nabadwip Dham-Patuli DL Railway Line was under construction. 170 Crore has been sanctioned by the Government of India. It has 16th longest railway platform in world 720 m (2,362 ft).

== Railway Connection to Krishnanagar City Junction ==
During 2009/10 Railway Budget, the then Railway Minister announced Gauge conversion of Shantipur - Krishnanagar - Nabadwip Ghat section from Narrow Gauge to Broad Gauge. The 27.5 kilometres (17.1 mi) long line is slated to be extended further 9.6 kilometres (6.0 mi) to connect Nabadwip Dham. As of today Shantipur - Krishnanagar - Amghata stretch of 24.7 kilometres (15.3 mi) has been converted to Broad Gauge. A massive 992.25 metres (3,255.4 ft) long bridge on River Bhagirathi has been constructed by 2018. But since then, Land hurdle, political warfare & political violence has derailed the project. This project once completed will lessen load on Naihati Junction - Bandel Junction via Sampreeti Bridge & will open another route to Darjeeling via Nabadwip Dham - Katwa Junction - Azimganj Junction.Indian Railway & both Howrah railway division & Sealdah railway division of Eastern Railway zone is trying to complete these projects by 2030.
