= Bandel–Katwa line =

Railway Route in West Bengal, India

Bandel–Katwa Line
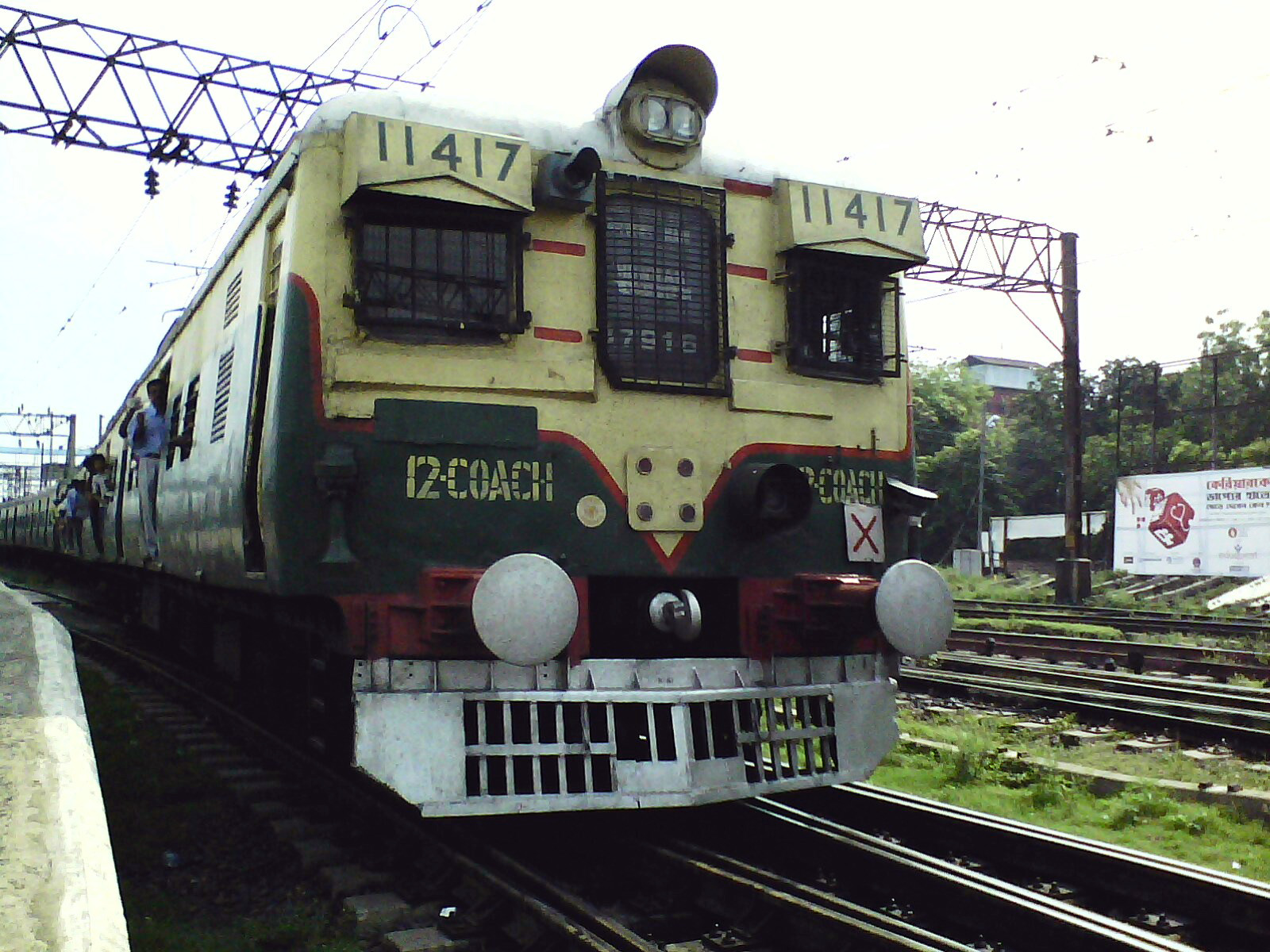
- A Howrah-bound EMU train leaving Bandel Jn.

Overview
- Status: Operational
- Owner: Eastern Railway of Indian Railways
- Locale: Hooghly district, Purba Bardhaman district and Nadia district
- Termini: Bandel Junction; Katwa
- Stations: 28

Service
- Type: Double electrified track
- System: Electrified
- Services: Bandel– Ambika Kalna – Nabadwip Dham – Katwa
- Operator(s): Eastern railway
- Depot(s): Bandel Jn.; Katwa Jn.
- Rolling stock: Local train 19; Passenger train 1; Express train 13; Total 33

History
- Opened: 1913; 113 years ago

Technical
- Line length: 104 km (65 mi)
- Number of tracks: 2
- Track gauge: 1,676 mm (5 ft 6 in) broad gauge
- Electrification: 1994-1996
- Operating speed: Max 100 kmph
- Highest elevation: Avg 14 m

The Bandel–Katwa line is a 104 kilometres (65 mi) long railway line connecting Bandel in Hooghly district and Katwa in Purba Bardhaman district of West Bengal, India. It is a major route for North bound trains from Howrah and forms a part of the Kolkata Suburban Railway system.

== History ==
In 1913, the Hooghly–Katwa Railway constructed a line from Bandel to Katwa. This was further extended by the Barharwa-Azimganj-Katwa railway to Barharwa on the Sahibganj loop line. The Burdwan Katwa Railway was constructed by McLeod's Light Railways in 1915.

A project 22 km in length, Nabadwip Dham–Patuli DL Railway Line is under construction. 170 Crore has been sanctioned by the Government of India. The track was doubled in 2014–15.

== Electrification ==
This line was electrified in 1994–96 with 25 kV overhead line.
