= JPQ =

JPQ or Jpq can refer to:

- Jhapandanga railway station, a train station in Purba Bardhaman district, West Bengal, India
- Jinping District, the central business district of Shantou, Guangdong province, China; see List of administrative divisions of Guangdong
- Jett Paqueteria, an airline from Mexico; see List of airline codes
- Jpq, an alternate notation for a XOR gate
- Jianshan (Chinese: 尖山), a station in Changsha, Hunan province, China, on the Changsha–Zhuzhou–Xiangtan intercity railway
