= Jaugram railway station =

Railway station in West Bengal, India

Jaugram
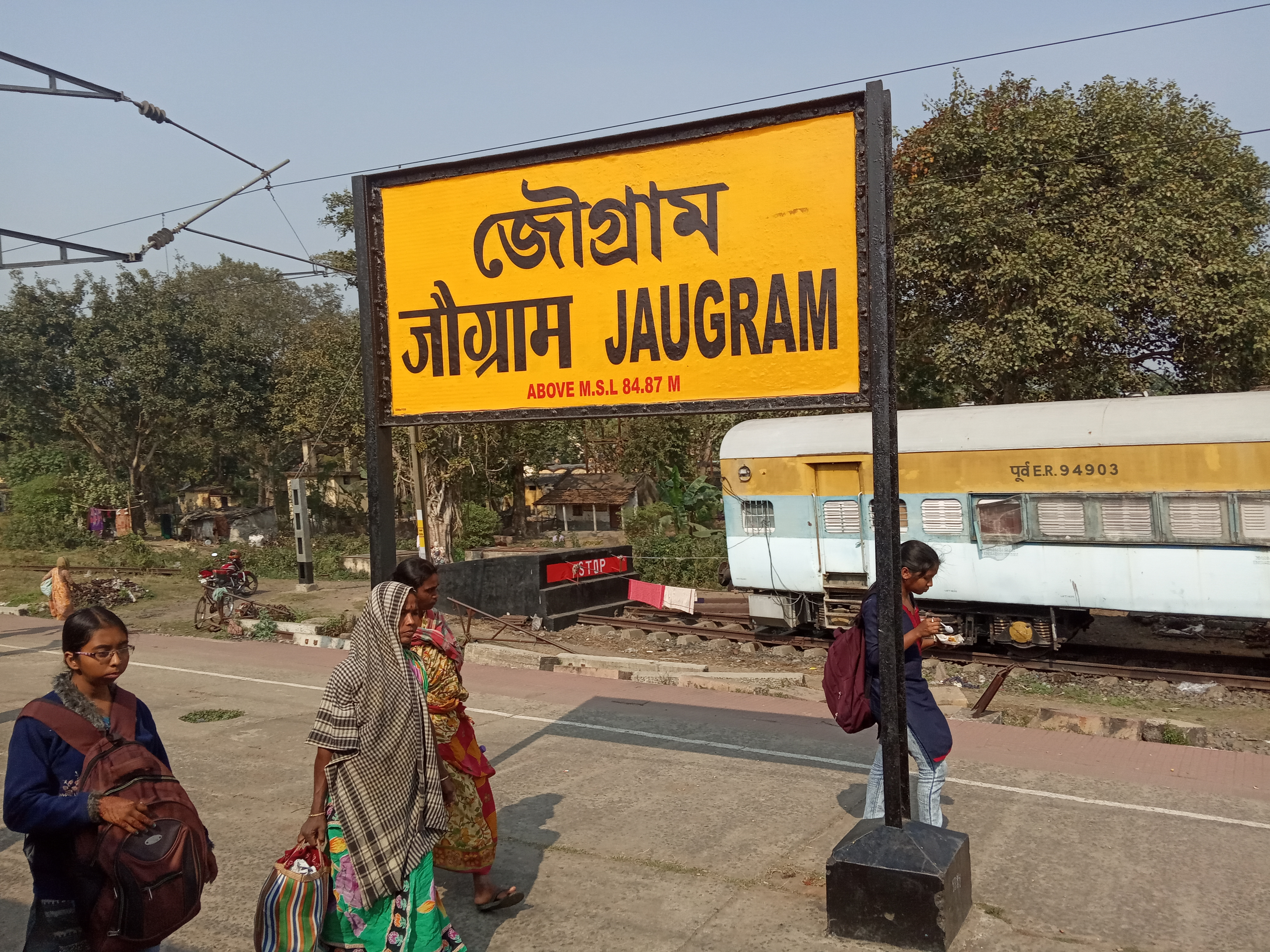
- Jaugram railway station

General information
- Location: Jaugram Main Road, Astai, Purba Bardhaman district, West Bengal; India
- Coordinates: 23°04′47″N 88°04′48″E
- Elevation: 23 metres (75 ft)
- System: Kolkata Suburban Railway
- Owner: Indian Railways
- Operator: Eastern Railway
- Line: Howrah–Bardhaman chord
- Platforms: 3
- Tracks: 3

Construction
- Structure type: Standard (on ground station)
- Parking: No

Other information
- Status: Functioning
- Station code: JRAE
- Division(s): Howrah

History
- Opened: 1917
- Electrified: 1964
- Former names: East Indian Railway Company

Services
Preceding station	Kolkata Suburban Railway	Following station
Jhapandanga towards Howrah Junction	Eastern Line Howrah–Bardhaman chord	Nabagram towards Barddhaman Junction
Route map
Location
- Location within West Bengal Location within India

Jaugram railway station is a Kolkata Suburban Railway station on the Howrah–Bardhaman chord line operated by Eastern Railway zone of Indian Railways. It is situated beside Jaugram Main Road, Astai in Purba Bardhaman district in the Indian state of West Bengal. Number of EMU trains stop at Jaugram railway station.

== History ==
The Howrah–Bardhaman chord, the 95 kilometers railway line was constructed in 1917. It was connected with Sealdah through Dankuni after construction of Vivekananda Setu in 1932. Howrah to Bardhaman chord line including Jaugram railway station was electrified in 1964–66.
