= Hajigarh railway station =

Railway station in West Bengal, India

Hajigarh
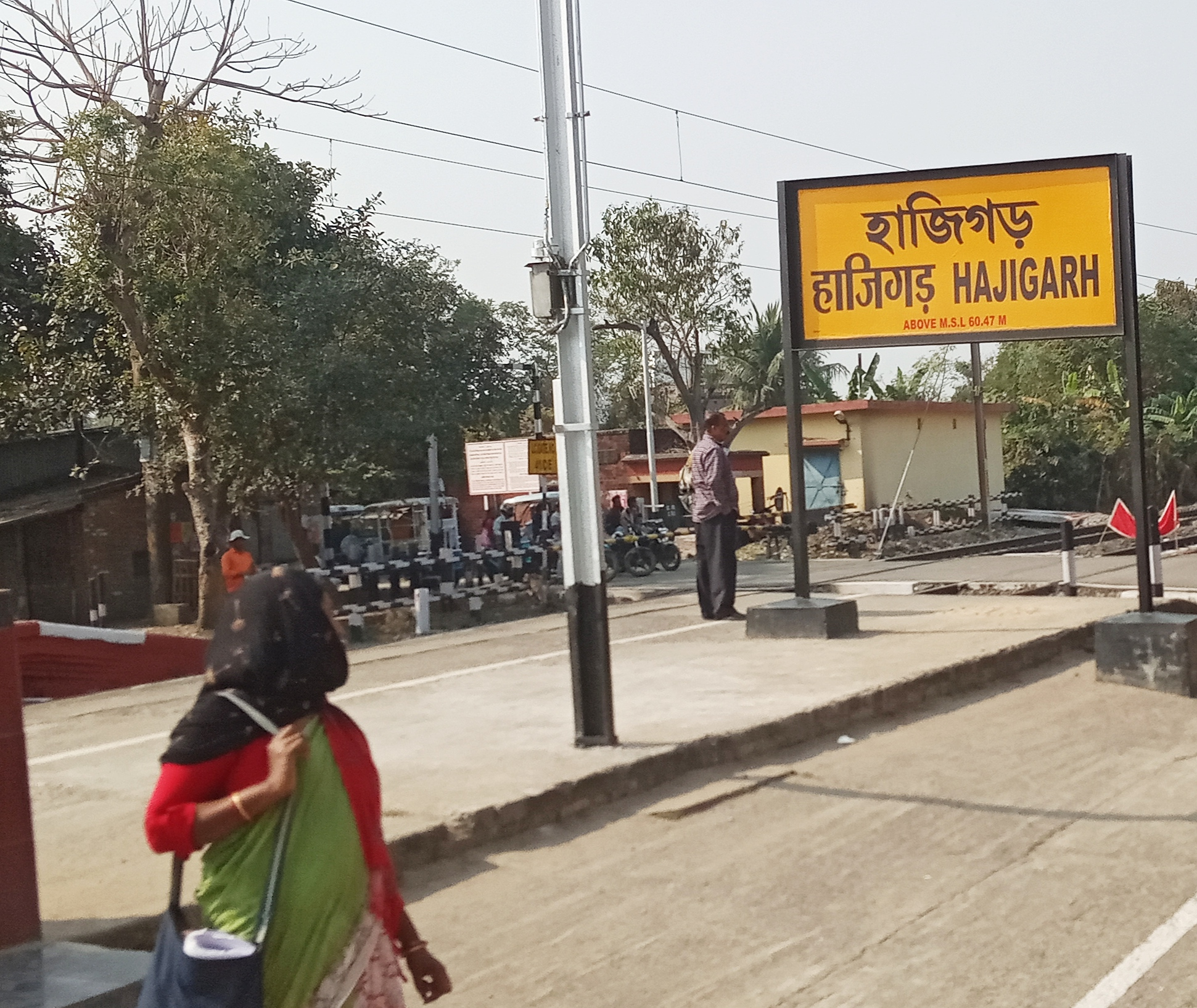
- Hajigarh railway station

General information
- Location: Durgapur Expressway, Cheragram, Hajigarh, Hooghly district, West Bengal; India
- Coordinates: 23°00′25″N 88°07′17″E
- Elevation: 20 metres (66 ft)
- System: Kolkata Suburban Railway
- Owner: Indian Railways
- Operator: Eastern Railway
- Line: Howrah–Bardhaman chord
- Platforms: 3
- Tracks: 3

Construction
- Structure type: Standard (on ground station)
- Parking: No

Other information
- Status: Functioning
- Station code: HIH
- Division(s): Howrah

History
- Opened: 1917
- Electrified: 1964
- Former names: East Indian Railway Company

Services
Preceding station	Kolkata Suburban Railway	Following station
Cheragram towards Howrah Junction	Eastern Line Howrah–Bardhaman chord	Gurap towards Barddhaman Junction
Route map
Location
- Location within West Bengal Location within India

Hajigarh railway station is a Kolkata Suburban Railway station on the Howrah–Bardhaman chord line operated by Eastern Railway zone of Indian Railways. It is situated beside Durgapur Expressway, Cheragram, Hajigarh in Hooghly district in the Indian state of West Bengal.

== History ==
The Howrah–Bardhaman chord, the 95 kilometers railway line was constructed in 1917. It was connected with Sealdah through Dankuni after construction of Vivekananda Setu in 1932. Howrah to Bardhaman chord line including Hajigarh railway station was electrified in 1964–66.
