= Bandel–Howrah Local =

Passenger train in India

Bandel–Howrah Local Howrah–Bandel Local
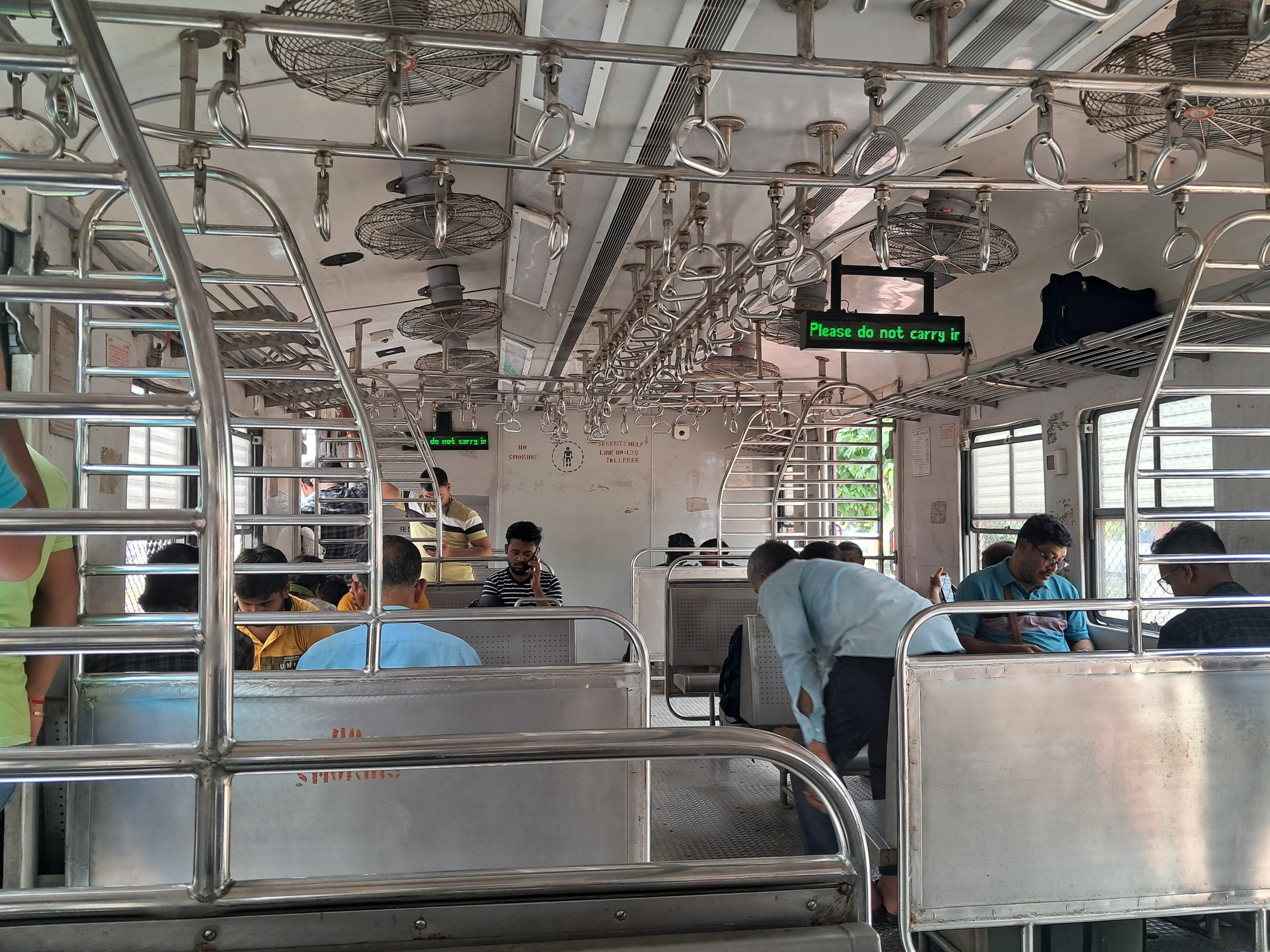
- Interior of a compartment in the train

Overview
- Service type: Kolkata Suburban Railway / Commuter
- Status: Operating
- Locale: Hooghly and Howrah district of West Bengal
- First service: 15 August 1854
- Current operator: Eastern Railway

Route
- Termini: Bandel Junction; Howrah
- Stops: 17
- Distance travelled: 39 km (24 mi)
- Average journey time: 1 hour 3 minutes
- Service frequency: Daily
- Train number: 37211 – 37291 (Note: Trains numbers 37201 and 37202 are also Bandel–Howrah Locals. But they are both Matribhumi special trains for ladies, and hence not included.)
- Line used: Howrah–Barddhaman main line

On-board services
- Class: General (Unreserved)
- Seating arrangements: Available
- Catering facilities: Unavailable
- Observation facilities: Openable windows available
- Baggage facilities: Overhead racks, Below the seats

Technical
- Rolling stock: ICF coach
- Track gauge: 1,676 mm (5 ft 6 in) (Note: 5 ft 6 in (1,676 mm) is the track gauge of Howrah–Barddhaman main line.)
- Electrification: 25 kV AC overhead line (Note: Eastern Railway as of October 2019 has 2118 km of rail electrified with 25 KV AC traction. This is also the electrification of Howrah-Barddhaman main line.) completed in 1957
- Operating speed: 39 km/h (24 mph) maximum, 38 km/h (24 mph) average including halts (Note: The average speed of Bandel–Howrah Local differs by train number. This speed is for 37212 BDC–HWH Local.)

Bandel–Howrah Local (/bændɛl hˈaʊrɑː/ bæn-del hau-rah) is a commuter passenger train of Kolkata Suburban Railway belonging to Eastern Railway Zone of Indian Railways. It runs between Bandel Junction and Howrah on a daily basis. It is usually the busiest and most crowded train operating from Bandel. The ticket for this train from Bandel Junction is 10 rupees.

It runs multiple times from Bandel and Howrah, usually 25 or more times in a day. It goes through 15 stations and stops at each one before reaching its destination. The train takes 1 hours and 3 minutes on average to get to Howrah. Bandel–Howrah Locals cross Hooghly District to reach Howrah in Howrah District. Bally is the first station in Howrah District in the Howrah–Barddhaman main line, Uttarpara is the last station to be in Hooghly District in the same line.

== History ==
The East India Railway Company was established in about the year 1845. Surveys were made at the time for construction of rail lines from Howrah to Delhi. One of the earliest portions built was a section between Howrah and Raniganj (or Raneegunge), a coal-producing district.

In late 1848, the financial condition of Great Britain began to improve and the political pressure orchestrated by Rowland Stephenson, John Chapman and their allies pushed the Court of Directors of the East India Company into negotiating contracts with the Great Indian Peninsular Railway and East India Railway. The two companies eventually got their guarantee–a five percent return on invested capital and other favourable conditions from an offer made in March 1849. And contractually formalised five months later after Acts of Parliament incorporated both with limited liability. Private companies could start to build their railways in India. This contract ended in 1879, lasting for 30 years when the state (West Bengal) purchased the entire railway system. The purchase was made for £32.75 million (2023) (equivalent to £34.07 million or US$43.54 million in 2024) which the state agreed to pay for in yearly instalments of £1.47 million (2023) (equivalent to £1.53 million or US$1.96 million in 2024) starting from 1 January 1880 and would terminate on 14 February 1953.

The initial contracts were small and designed to fund small stretches of railway line. In Eastern India the 121 miles (195 km) line from Howrah to Raniganj was explicitly labelled as an "Experimental" line designed to test whether the railways could be built and successfully operated in India. Nevertheless, the construction of the lines began. The GIPR's Bombay–Thane line was opened in 1853, where the first train in India ran. The 37 miles (60 km) Howrah to Pundooah line of EIR was completed in September 1854.

The first train of the East India Railway Company ran from Howrah to Hooghly on 15 August 1854, a 24 miles (39 km) stretch of rail line. From that day onwards, the company ran regular train services with stops at Bally, Shrirampur and Chandannagar. The main booking office was on the Calcutta bank of Hooghly river, the Armenian ghat today. Three thousand people applied for tickets for the first train, but only a small portion of such people were able to board. Howrah station at that time was simply a tin shed with a small booking office and a small narrow platform. This train was not named Bandel–Howrah Local, but it was the first to go from Howrah to Hooghly, one station from Bandel, resembling much of the modern local train that goes from Bandel to Howrah.

Latest 1897 model of the first train of the East India Railway Company that ran from Howrah to Hooghly

This first division of experimental line from Howrah to Hooghly, was opened for passenger traffic on 15 August 1854, an extension to Pundooah railway station was opened a fortnight later. During the first sixteen weeks, no less than 109,634 passengers boarded these regular trains, the gross earnings (including those for a few tons of merchandise) were 6,792 British pounds, 15 Shillings, and 9 British pennies (approx. £652,500 in 2025), which is an average of £424 10s. and 11$\tfrac{11}{13}$d. (£40,700 in 2025) per week.

Looking to the small portion of line opened, the traffic has far exceeded the most sanguine expectations ; and perhaps the most gratifying feature of all is in the fact that, contrary to a general belief in the indisposition and inability of the natives to avail themselves of railway communication, by far the largest number of passengers carried has been of the third class. The following is an analysis of the traffic:- First Class, 5,511 ; Second Class, 21,005 ; Third Class, 83,118.

— The Board

It was considered an extraordinary act that even the poorest of the inhabitants had been able to board the railway when it was directly opened. The third class fare in that time was $\tfrac{3}{8}$penny per mile of travel and there were only three classes, this proved that neither caste or money prejudice and neither other considerations would have prevented the natives from using the new means of transport, many people before, held a contrary opinion.

Travelling by the Rail very much resembles migrating in one vast colony, or setting out together in a whole moving town or caravan. Nothing under this enormous load is ever tagged to the back of a locomotive, and yet we were no sooner in motion than Calcutta, and the Hooghly, and Howrah all began to recede away like the scenes in a Dissolving View...

From Howrah to Bally the journey now-a-days is one of five minutes. In twice that time one reaches to Serampore. The next station is Chandernagore–thence to Chinsurah, and then on to Hooghly and Muggra. The Danes, the Dutch, the French, the Portuguese, and the English, all settling at these places in each other's neighbourhood, once presented the microcosm of Europe on the banks of the Hooghly. All along the road the villages still turn out to see the progress of the train and gaze in ignorant admiration at the little world borne upon its back.

— Bholanauth Chunder

It was only in 1854 that the route from Howrah to Delhi was actually considered, running through and stopping at Patna, Benaras, Mirzapur, Allahabad, and Agra railway stations. The merchandise carried in the train would be carried by boats and transferred to the other side of the Hooghly river, because the train's terminal was Howrah. It was not until 1867 that the first train service between Delhi and Howrah actually started, suffering setbacks and delays from the Sepoy Mutiny of 1857, direct communication with Bombay was also established because of the successful train movement.

== Service ==
The average speed of the train is 38 km/h. It stops at 15 stations (17 including Bandel and Howrah) and waits for more time in Bandel and Howrah Junction. The amount of time it waits at the other non-junction stations is the same, including Seoraphuli Junction, that is less than 1 minute.

This train is usually very crowded at all times, especially from Bandel Junction. This is because more people go to Howrah rather than Bandel.

== Halts ==
The train runs through Howrah–Barddhaman main line. It runs from Bandel and stops at the following stations in order:

Bandel–Howrah Local halts
Station	Dist. (km)	Station Code	Area served	Elevation
Hooghly	2	HGY	Hugli-Chuchura	14 metres (46 ft)
Chuchura	4	CNS	Hugli-Chuchura	15 metres (49 ft)
Chandan Nagar	7	CGR	Chandannagar	16 metres (52 ft)
Mankundu	9	MUU	Mankundu	13 metres (43 ft)
Bhadreshwar	11	BHR	Bhadreswar	14 metres (46 ft)
Baidyabati	15	BBAE	Baidyabati	17 metres (56 ft)
Seoraphuli Jn.	17	SHE	Sheoraphuli	13 metres (43 ft)
Shrirampur	19	SRP	Serampore	17 metres (56 ft)
Rishra	23	RIS	Rishra	17 metres (56 ft)
Konnagar	25	KOG	Konnagar	17 metres (56 ft)
Hind Motor	27	HMZ	Hindmotor	9 metres (30 ft)
Uttarpara	29	UPA	Uttarpara	9 metres (30 ft)
Bally	30	BLY	Bally	8 metres (26 ft)
Belur	32	BEQ	Belur	18 metres (59 ft)
Liluah	34	LLH	Liluah	10 metres (33 ft)

Before reaching Howrah Junction.

=== Bandel Junction (BDC) ===
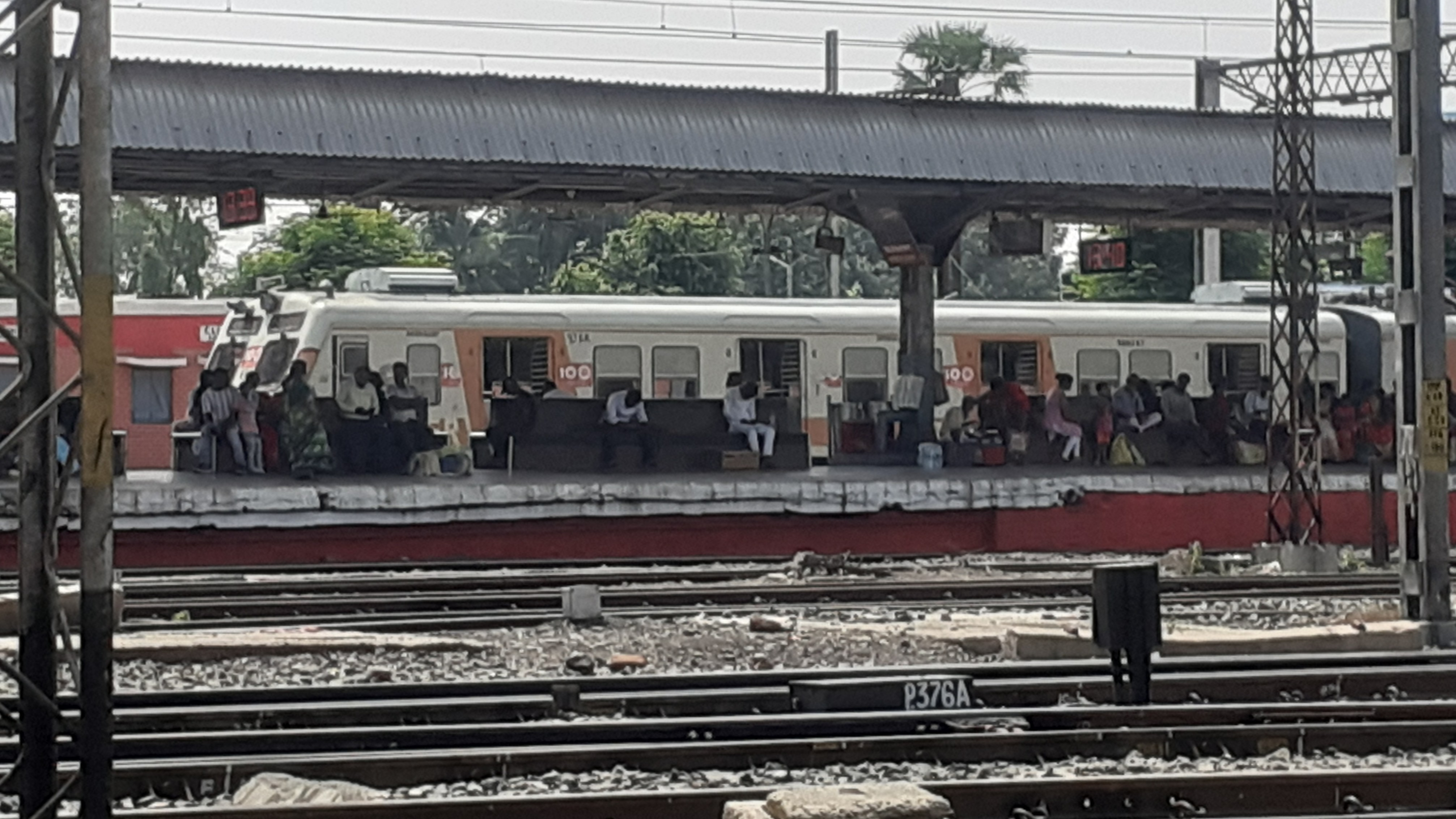
Bandel–Howrah Local from the side stalled in Bandel Junction

Bandel Junction is a major and one of the crucial railway stations in India serving the city of Bandel. It is often considered to be the busiest and a major transportation hub in Hooghly district. Bandel has many facilities for travelling passengers such as food stalls, waiting rooms, sanitized washrooms and restrooms, also featuring parking facilities. Its station code is BDC and a total of around 350 trains pass through it. Bandel also makes its way in the top hundred train ticket booking and train travelling stations of the Indian Railways. The station currently has seven platforms, namely 1A, 1B, 1, 2, 3, 4, and 5. But it is subject to change from 31 May 2022 due to the electrical interlocking work at Bandel, from which the station platforms will change: 1B would become 1, 1A → 2, 1 → 3, 2 → 4, 3 → 5, 4 → 7 and 5 → platform number 6, announced by the station master, Bidhan Sarkar. Bandel currently serves primarily for suburban customers or commuters, with local trains accounting to 80% of its footfall. Ashwini Vaishnaw, the Railway Minister of India has regulated reviewing and approval for the upgrades and redevelopment of various railway stations, including Bandel Jn, to transform it into a world-class railway station. This redevelopment aims for improving passenger experience and upgrading the station's infrastructure. The new, upgraded station is set to involve the construction of a concourse area and new platforms, improving the existing ones, high speed Wi-Fi and also feature amenities like modern waiting areas, restrooms, upgraded info system and security features such as CCTV cameras. Bandel's redesign was implemented when Eastern Railway's general manager, Arun Arora held a momentous meeting at the ER headquarters in Fairlie Place in Kolkata. All the principal heads of departments and DRMs of Howrah and Sealdah division were present, and a presentation about the matter was made by a Delhi-based architect, for the speedy execution of a ₹349 crore (equivalent to ₹381 crore or US$40 million in 2026) transformation project of Bandel Junction, to make it into a world class railway station. Bandel station was closed for three days because of the construction of Bandel–Mogra third rail line, a 6.99 km line and also for the electronic interlocking system works in the station. These works started from 27 May and were completed by 30 May, a Monday. This new Electronic Interlocking System of Bandel is considered to be largest electronic interlocking system in the world, consisting of 1002 interlocking routes, replacing the old system with only about 492 routes. Puneet Pathak, the managing director of Param Enterprise, the contractor of this project, said that they have submitted an application for the inclusion of Bandel Junction in the Guinness Book of World Records, the platforms numbers have also been changed because of this reason. Indian Railways has already recognized Bandel as the world's largest interlocking system. From Bandel Jn, lines also allow rail access to Naihati by crossing Jubilee Bridge (previously), spanning 1,200 feet (370 m) in length, a central double cantilever of 360 feet (110 m), and two main side spans each of 420 feet (130 m). It was opened by Viceroy Lord Dufferin in 1887.

=== Hooghly (HGY) ===
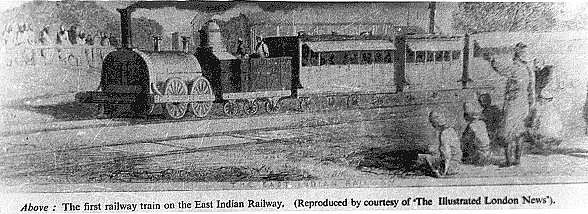
First train of East India Railway Company, from Howrah to Hooghly

Hooghly railway station is an important historical station of Eastern Railway. On 15 August 1854, the first train of East India Railway Company ran from Howrah to Hooghly, covering a distance of 24 miles (39 km). Regular services were also introduced from that day. The East India Railway Company was established by the British, or more specifically during the time of East India Company, to manage and develop railway operations and systems in Eastern and Northern parts of India. The company ran regular services from 15 August onwards with stops at Bally, Shrirampur and Chandannagar. The fare at the time ranged from ₹3 (equivalent to ₹2,200 or US$23 in 2026) for first class and 7 annas for third class. The main booking office was on the Calcutta bank of Hooghly River, currently the Armenian Ghat. Three thousand people applied for tickets on this first train, but only a small portion were actually able to be accommodated on the train. Thousands of people were present along the tracks to see the first train of Eastern Railway.

=== Chuchura (CNS) ===
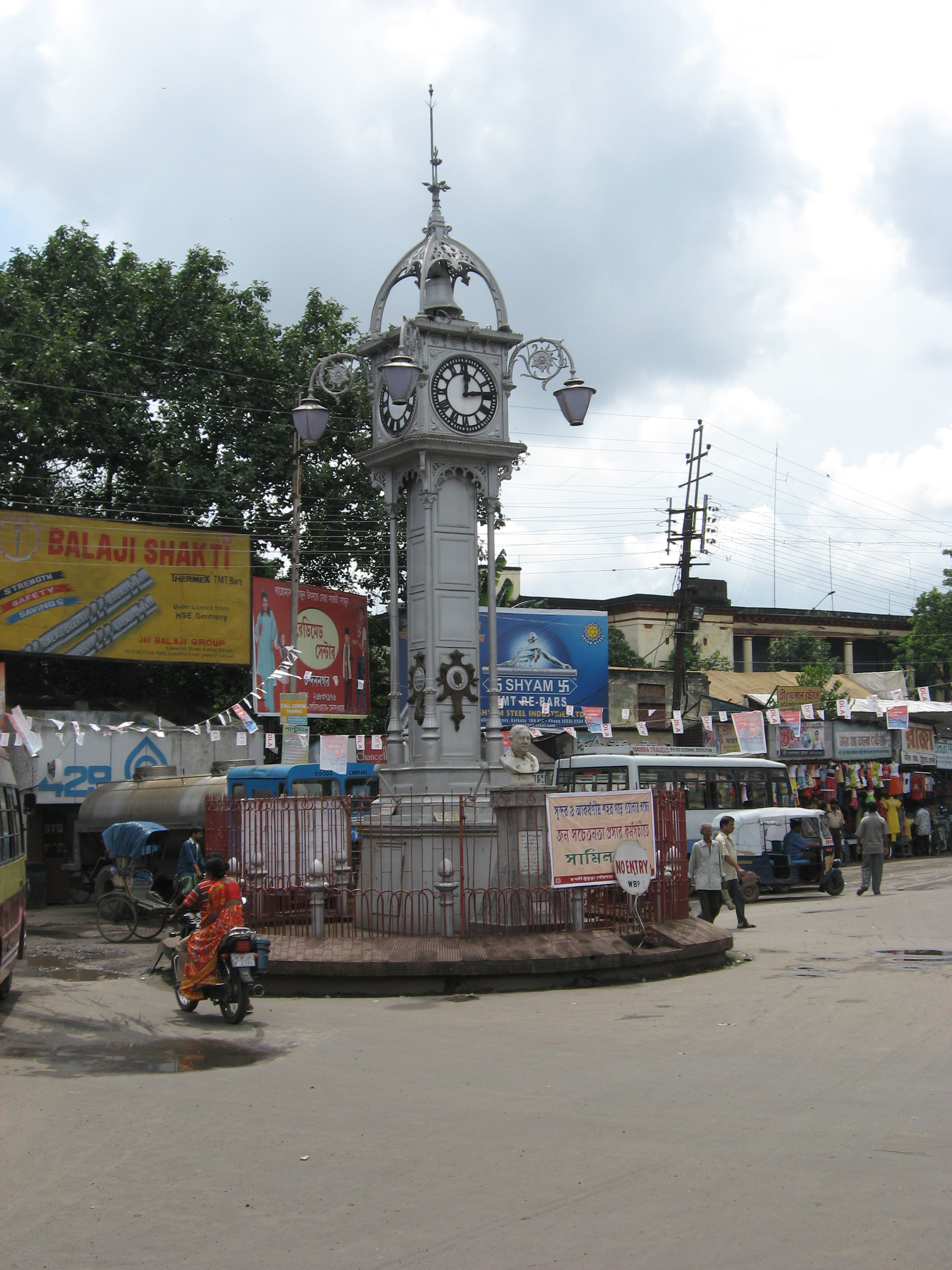
Ghorir More

Chuchura railway station is the second railway station serving Hooghly-Chinsurah after Hooghly. Chinsurah (Chuchura) is a municipality and the headquarters of Hooghly district, 35 kilometres (22 mi) from Kolkata. Chinsurah is well known for its historical monuments like Edwardian Clock Tower (locally, Ghorir More) and Hooghly Imambara. The Edwardian Clock Tower is present in the centre, overlooking a four-way intersection installed in memory of King Edward VII of United Kingdom 1914, who died in 1910; this tower has 4 clocks on its sides and 4 lamps on its upper vertices. The Hooghly Imambara is a Shia Muslim congregation hall, two-stories high, located just beside the Hooghly river. It is marked for its sizeable court yard, lengthy corridors, a concrete sun dial, fountains and a water tank in the centre, its large clock tower manufactured in London supported by two towers, a huge assembly hall and especially for its Muslim architecture. The construction of the mosque was started in 1841 and completed in 1861 by Haji Muhammad Mohsin.

=== Chandan Nagar (CGR) ===
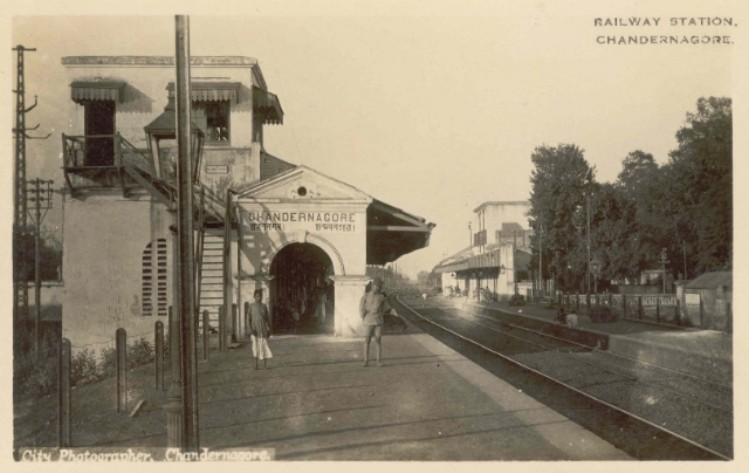
Chandan Nagar

Chandan Nagar railway station, serves the French town of Chandannagar. Chandannagar, previously called Chandernagore, is currently a city of 19 square kilometres, of French history, and the only municipal corporation in Hooghly district and one of the seven in West Bengal. One of the main stations, it was located just outside the French-territory near Hooghly river. It now serves EMU trains and express trains. After the French left Chandannagar, it was relinquished to Bengal in 1950, the buildings of French architecture built by them still remain. Prime Minister Narendra Modi proclaimed the redevelopment of 28 Eastern Railway stations including Chandan Nagar on 26 February 2024 as part of the Amrit Bharat Station Scheme. The total project cost for Howrah division is ₹78.14 crore (US$8.1 million), Chandan Nagar being apportioned ₹18.34 crore. Kolkata Metro Rail Corporation, operator of the Green Line of Kolkata Metro, (Note: Kolkata Metro Rail Corporation was formed in 2008, the Green Line of Kolkata Metro became operational in 2020, and the Kolkata Metro as a whole became operational in 1984.) had taken up a survey for extension of the metro network from Howrah Maidan to Chandannagar. Metro trains would reach this metro stations by routing through Shalimar, Santragachi and Dankuni, this proposal is awaiting approval.

== Cancellations and Incidents ==
=== Cancellations ===
21 December 2024: Starting from 21 December 2024, the Howrah Division of Eastern Railway announced the cancellation of at least 60 suburban local trains including Bandel–Howrah Local due to the construction of a bow string girder bridge, which is a new two-lane Benaras road over bridge, near Howrah station, as said by a senior ER manager. The Chandmari bridge in Howrah was also being repaired besides the Benaras road bridge in Salkia. At least 30 Bandel–Howrah Local trains and some other trains such as Howrah–Belur Math, Howrah–Shrirampur local would be cancelled, according to Divisional Railway Manager Sanjeev Kumar. Even express trains such as Gaya–Howrah express and Azimganj–Howrah passenger special had been delayed or rescheduled. These adjustments would start from 21 December 2024 and continue till 1 February 2025. The following trains have been cancelled.

- 37215, 37231, 37237, 37243, 37249, 37253, 37255 37257, 37263, 37267, 37271, 37275, 37277, 37285 (Howrah to Bandel)
- 37212, 37214, 37216, 37218, 37222, 37230 37232, 37236, 37244, 37250, 37254, 37278, 37288 (Bandel to Howrah)
- 37201 Howrah–Bandel Local, 37220, 37264 Bandel–Howrah Local (All run daily except Sundays)

The above are the 30 trains have been cancelled for about 33 days.

8 September 2022: Around a total of 189 trains had been cancelled on 8 September 2022 because of some operational or maintenance issues. As per the IRCTC website, the list includes trains running from several cities, but many of them are local trains running from important West Bengal cities like Howrah, Bardhaman, Naihati and Sealdah. This list includes a lot of local trains on the Kolkata suburban railway network such as Bardhhaman–Howrah Chord Local, Belur Math–Howrah Local and Naihati–Sealdah Local; but only 2 Bandel–Howrah Local or Howrah–Bandel Local trains had been cancelled.

- 37211 Howrah–Bandel Local (Howrah to Bandel Junction)
- 37216 Bandel–Howrah Local (Bandel to Howrah Junction)

14 December 2024: Indian Railways has cancelled the operations of many trains (more than 75), for reasons such as maintenance work. A lot of EMU trains such as Howrah–Bardhaman EMU, Sealdah–Baruipara EMU and Masagram–Howrah EMU have been cancelled. There any only 6 such Bandel–Howrah Local trains that have been cancelled.

- 37243, 37245, 37283 Howrah–Bandel Local (Howrah to Bandel Junction)
- 37216, 37222, 37240 Bandel–Howrah Local (Bandel to Howrah Junction)

27 October 2022: The Indian Railway cancelled around 94 trains that were scheduled to depart on this day. A large number of trains had been cancelled including mails, commuters and express. These trains were cancelled, according to the National Train Enquiry System (NTES), because of repairs and other reasons in different parts of the country. These cancellations, mostly in the commuters could have led to daily passengers facing trouble. The trains might also have been cancelled because of different reasons, such as storms, heavy rain or floods. 6 Bandel–Howrah Locals had been cancelled.

- 37211 (4:47 am), 37247 (1:15 pm), 37253 (2:40 pm) (Howrah to Bandel trains)
- 37216 (4:45 am), 37246 (12:30 pm), 37256 (3:10 pm) (Bandel to Howrah trains)

13 August 2022: The same above Bandel–Howrah Local trains had been cancelled on the day. Other than that, 17 trains had been rescheduled and 18 were diverted. The reasons include railway track maintenance, technical reasons, etc. But the main reason was heavy rainfall and storms that had been occurring recently in the country. The total trains cancelled on the day were 167.

=== Incidents and disruptions ===
27 February 2025: Train movement on the Howrah–Barddhaman main line was disrupted for almost three hours when the pantograph of a Bandel–Howrah EMU train got entangled with the overhead wire while the train was leaving Bandel Junction, said by an ER official. The movement of trains on the line was affected from 8:20 a.m. till 11:07 a.m. during morning rush hours. Trains on the Howrah–Barddhaman main line were restored after the necessary repairs were completed at 11:07 am. About 23 suburban trains were cancelled in the section because of the disruption, said by the official.

12 May 2022: Train services in the Bandel–Howrah line would remain shut for four hours each day for two weeks from May 13. This was notified by Eastern Railways. Trains services would remain closed from 11 a.m. to 2 p.m. everyday from May 13 to 26 in this section. 18 trains on the Bandel–Howrah line would be cancelled. Other lines include Bandel–Mogra, Howrah–Barddhaman main line, Bandel–Katwa and Bandel–Naihati.

4 August 2024: On Sunday, while 37248 Down Howrah–Bandel Local was reaching for Howrah, passengers saw flames coming out of the pantograph of the wire while it was entering Baidyabati station on the line. It took place at around 1:45 a.m. in the afternoon when the train was entering platform number 1 of Baidyabati. Because of the fire, many passengers on the train quickly got off at the station. The train was operating on the down (reverse) line and train movement on said line was shut down for more than half an hour, or roughly 35 minutes; the train itself was also stopped for that much time. Upon receiving the incident's news, Government Railway Police (GRP) of Seoraphuli, Railway Protection Force (RPF) and other railway staff and employees arrived at the scene. Later, the train which was then empty, was sent to Howrah station and train movement on the line was restored.

20 April 2024: On this Saturday, black smoke was seen coming out of a Howrah–Bandel Local that left Bandel at roughly 8:30 a.m. and entered Chuchura station platform 2 after some time, from the last coach (compartment). The driver stopped the train receiving this information and the passengers boarding rushed to get off the train. It is sourced that this smoke was coming out because of the train's brake binding. Railway workers arrived at the scene and were able to deal with the situation fairly quickly. The railways initially reported no damage, casualties or injuries. The train was stopped and removed and the Bandel–Howrah section's train route was temporarily disrupted for some time.

== Train Schedule ==
There are about 80 total services of Bandel–Howrah Local that are functional or used to be functional (mainly because of cancellations). Not all of them run daily. (Sources: India Rail Info, Etrain.info, trainspnrstatus.com) (Note: Odd train numbers exist but not shown.)

Train No.	From station	To station	Depart.	Arrival.	Pf.(HWH)	Pf.(BDC)	Avg. Speed	Travelling Time	Cancelled	Frequency
37211	Howrah	Bandel	4:47	5:45	3	1A	41 km/h (25 mph)	58 mins	24/10/2024	Daily
37212	Bandel	Howrah	3:07	4:10	1	1	38 km/h (24 mph)	1 hour 3 mins	No	Daily
37213	Howrah	Bandel	5:14	6:15	1	1A	39 km/h (24 mph)	1 hour 1 min	25/10/2024	Daily
37214	Bandel	Howrah	3:50	4:50	1	1	39 km/h (24 mph)	1 hour	25/10/2024	Daily
37215	Howrah	Bandel	6:26	7:27	2	2	40 km/h (25 mph)	1 hour 1 min	25/10/2024	Daily
37216	Bandel	Howrah	4:45	5:50	4	1	36 km/h (22 mph)	1 hour 5 mins	25/10/2024	Daily
37217	Howrah	Bandel	7:05	8:05	1	1	39 km/h (24 mph)	1 hour	25/10/2024	Daily except Sundays
37218	Bandel	Howrah	5:10	6:12	10	2	38 km/h (24 mph)	1 hour 2 min	No	Daily
37219	Howrah	Bandel	7:35	8:37	4	2	38 km/h (24 mph)	1 hour 2 min	No	Daily
37220	Bandel	Howrah	5:40	6:45	2	1	36 km/h (22 mph)	1 hour 5 mins	25/10/2024	Daily except Sundays
37221	Howrah	Bandel	8:20	9:20	4	1	39 km/h (24 mph)	1 hour	25/10/2024	Daily
37222	Bandel	Howrah	6:30	7:35	3	3	36 km/h (22 mph)	1 hour 5 mins	25/10/2024	Daily
37223	Howrah	Bandel	8:45	9:45	4	4	39 km/h (24 mph)	1 hour	No	Daily except Sundays
37224	Bandel	Howrah	6:48	7:54	3	2	37 km/h (23 mph)	1 hour 4 mins	No	Daily

== See also ==
- Bandel
- Howrah
- Black Diamond Express
- Doon Express
- Bagh Express
- Teesta Torsha Express
- Kolkata Suburban Railway
- Howrah–Barddhaman main line
- Howrah–Barddhaman chord line
- Sealdah railway station
- Kolkata railway station
- Kolkata
