= Howrah–Amritsar Express =

Defunct Indian express train

Overview
- Service type: Express
- First service: 1925
- Last service: 2021
- Current operator: Eastern Railway zone

Route
- Termini: Howrah Junction (HWH); Amritsar Junction (ASR)
- Stops: 104
- Distance travelled: 1,924 km (1,196 mi)
- Average journey time: 45 hrs (Average)
- Service frequency: Daily (Note: Runs seven days in a week for every direction.)
- Train number: 13049/13050

On-board services
- Classes: AC 3 Tier, Sleeper class, General Unreserved and a Military Reserved Compartment
- Seating arrangements: Yes
- Sleeping arrangements: Yes
- Catering facilities: No Pantry Car, however on-board and e-catering services were available
- Observation facilities: ICF Coaches
- Entertainment facilities: No

Technical
- Rolling stock: 2
- Track gauge: 1,676 mm (5 ft 6 in)
- Operating speed: 42 km/h (Average)

Howrah–Amritsar Express was an Express train of the Indian Railways connecting Howrah in West Bengal and Amritsar Junction of Punjab. It operated with 13049/13050 train numbers on daily basis. Owing to its popularity, it used to be known as the Duplicate Punjab Mail by the local population.

== Service ==
The 13049/Howrah–Amritsar Express had average speed of 43 km/h and covered 1924 km in 44h 30m. 13050/Amritsar–Howrah Express had average speed of 42 km/h and covered 1924 km in 45h 35m.

The train was permanently cancelled in 2021 after the rationalization of the train services in India after COVID-19 pandemic.

== Route and halts ==
The train has total 104 stoppages enroute. The important halts of the train were:

- Howrah Junction, Shrirampur, Seoraphuli, Chandannagar, Bandel Junction, Barddhaman Junction, Asansol Junction, Chittaranjan, Madhupur Junction, Jasidih Junction, Jhajha, Mokama Junction, Patna Junction, Ara Junction, Buxar, PT. Deen Dayal Upadhyaya Junction, Varanasi Junction, Lucknow, Moradabad, Najibabad, Laksar, Roorkee, Saharanpur Junction, Yamunanagar-Jagadhri, Ambala Cantonment Junction, Ludhiana Junction to Amritsar Junction

== Coach composition ==
The train had ICF coaches with max speed of 110 kmph. The train consisted of 19 coaches:

- Five - General Second Class coaches
- Seven - Sleeper Class coaches
- Three - AC Three Tier coaches
- Two - SLR Coaches
- One - Military Coach
- One - High Capacity Parcel Van

== Traction ==
Between Howrah Junction to Lucknow Junction, the train was generally hauled by Howrah Loco Shed based WAP-4 locomotive. From Lucknow Junction to Saharanpur Junction, it was hauled by Lucknow Loco Shed based WDM-3A locomotive. And for the rest of the journey between Saharanpur Junction and Amritsar Junction, it was hauled by Ghaziabad Locomotive Shed based WAP-7 locomotive.

== See also ==
- Howrah railway station
- Amritsar Junction railway station
- Durgiana Express
