= Bhadreshwar railway station =

Railway Station in West Bengal, India

Bhadreshwar
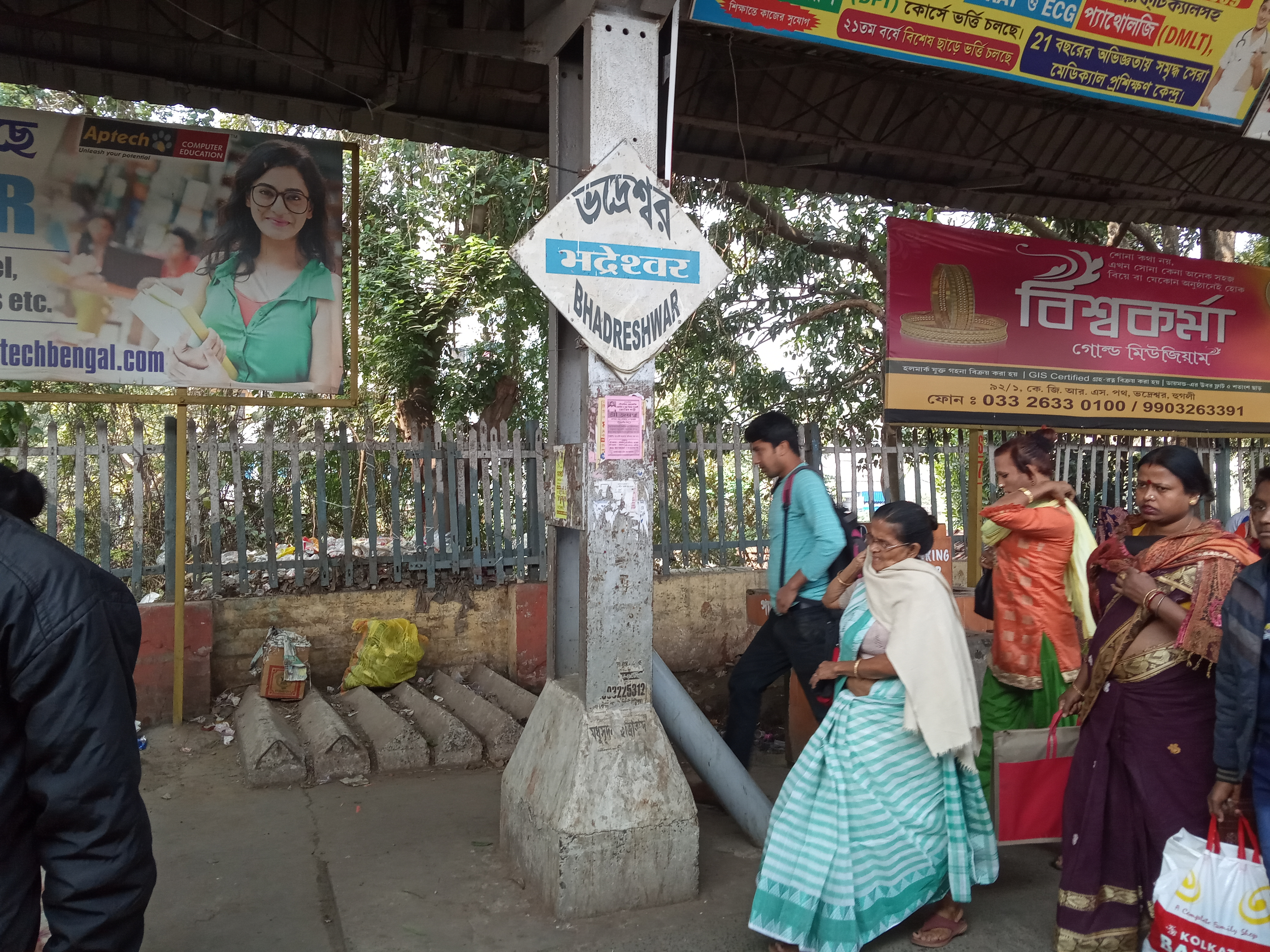
- Bhadreswar railway station

General information
- Location: Bhadreswar Station Road, Bhadreswar, Hooghly, West Bengal; India
- Coordinates: 22°49′41″N 88°20′29″E
- Elevation: 14 metres (46 ft)
- System: Kolkata Suburban Railway station
- Owner: Indian Railways
- Operator: Eastern Railway
- Line: Howrah–Bardhaman main line
- Platforms: 3
- Tracks: 3

Construction
- Structure type: Standard (on-ground station)
- Parking: No
- Cycle facilities: Yes

Other information
- Status: Functioning
- Station code: BHR
- Division(s): Howrah

History
- Opened: 1854
- Electrified: 1958
- Former names: East Indian Railway Company

Services
Preceding station	Kolkata Suburban Railway	Following station
Baidyabati towards Howrah Junction	Eastern Line Main line	Mankundu towards Bandel Junction
Route map
Location
- Location within West Bengal Location within India

Bhadreshwar railway station is a Kolkata Suburban Railway station on the Howrah–Bardhaman main line. It is located in Hooghly district in the Indian state of West Bengal. It is under the jurisdiction of Eastern Railway zone. Bhadreshwar railway station is a small railway stations of Howrah railway division. It serves Bhadreswar and surrounding areas. It is 28 km. from Howrah Station.

== History ==
East Indian Railway Company started construction of a line out of Howrah for the proposed link with Delhi via Rajmahal and Mirzapur in 1851.

The first passenger train in eastern India ran from Howrah to Hooghly on 15 August 1854. The track was extended to Raniganj by 1855.

== Electrification ==
Electrification of Howrah—Burdwan main line was completed with 25 kV AC overhead system in 1958.
