= Shrirampur railway station =

Railway station in West Bengal, India

Shrirampur
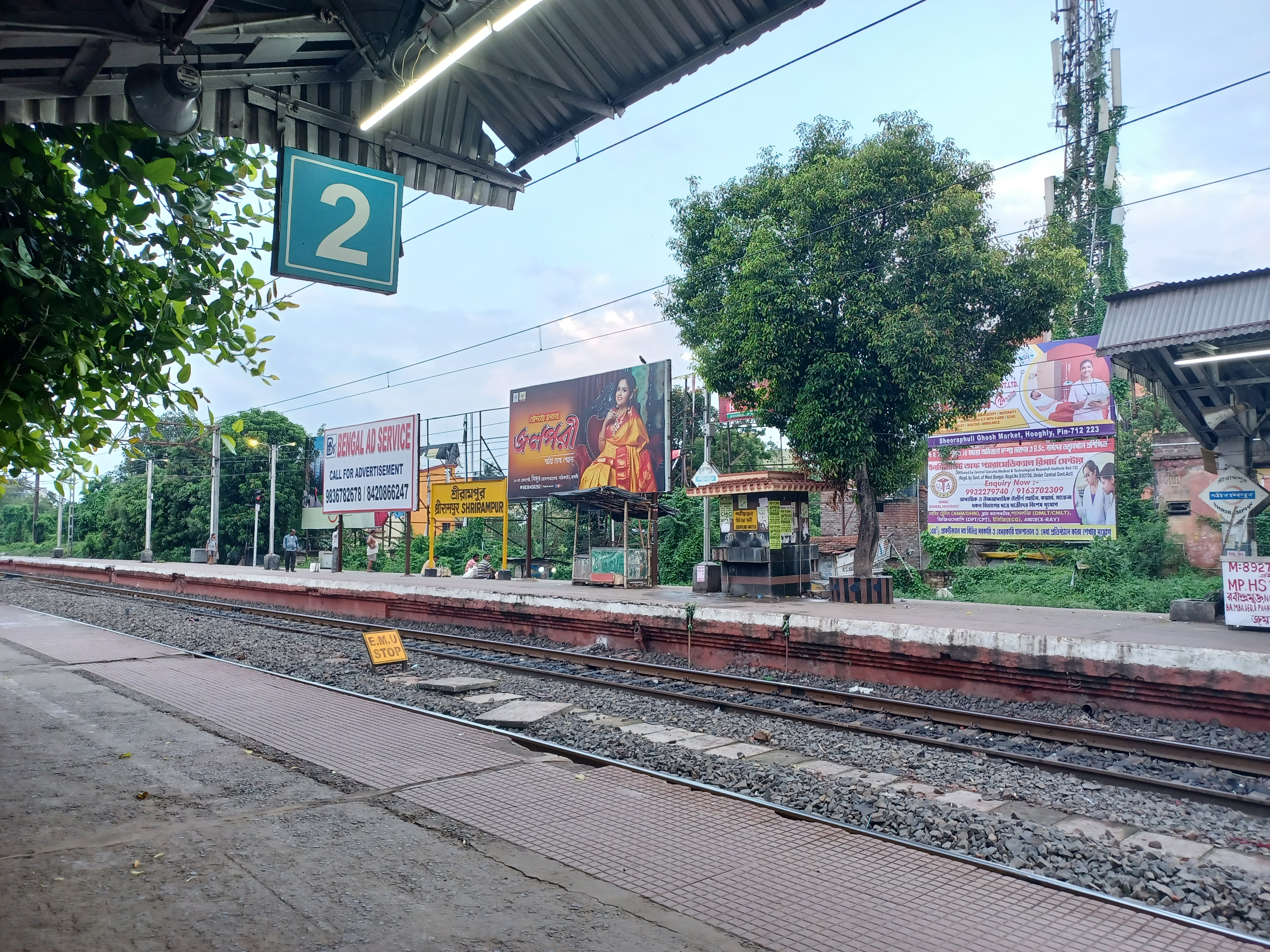
- Shrirampur station

General information
- Location: Roy M.C Lahiri Bahadur Street, Station Rd, Station Bazaar, Serampore, Hooghly district – 712201, West Bengal; India
- Coordinates: 22°45′15″N 88°20′19″E
- Elevation: 17 metres (56 ft)
- System: Kolkata Suburban Railway station
- Owner: Indian Railways
- Operator: Eastern Railway
- Line: Howrah–Bardhaman main line
- Platforms: 4
- Tracks: 4

Construction
- Structure type: At grade
- Parking: Yes
- Cycle facilities: Yes

Other information
- Status: Functioning
- Station code: SRP
- Zone(s): Eastern Railway
- Division(s): Howrah

History
- Opened: 1854
- Electrified: 1958
- Former names: East Indian Railway Company

Services
Preceding station	Kolkata Suburban Railway	Following station
Rishra towards Howrah Junction	Eastern Line Main line	Seoraphuli Junction towards Bandel Junction
Route map
Location
- Location within West Bengal Location within India

Shrirampur railway station (also known as Serampore railway station) is one of the busiest railway stations on the Howrah–Bardhaman main line located in the Hooghly district, of the Indian state of West Bengal. An at-grade station, it serves Serampore city.

== History ==
The first train of the Eastern Railway started its journey from Howrah to Hooghly on 15 August 1854. The train's first halt was Bally and its second was Serampore.

== Electrification ==
Electrification of Howrah–Burdwan main line was completed with a 25 kV AC overhead system in 1958.

== Trains ==
The following Express/Superfast trains halt at Serampore railway station (SRP) in both directions:

- 13009/10 Doon Express (YNRK - HWH)
- 13019/20 Bagh Express (KGM - HWH)
- 13021/22 Mithila Express (RXL - HWH)

== Gallery ==
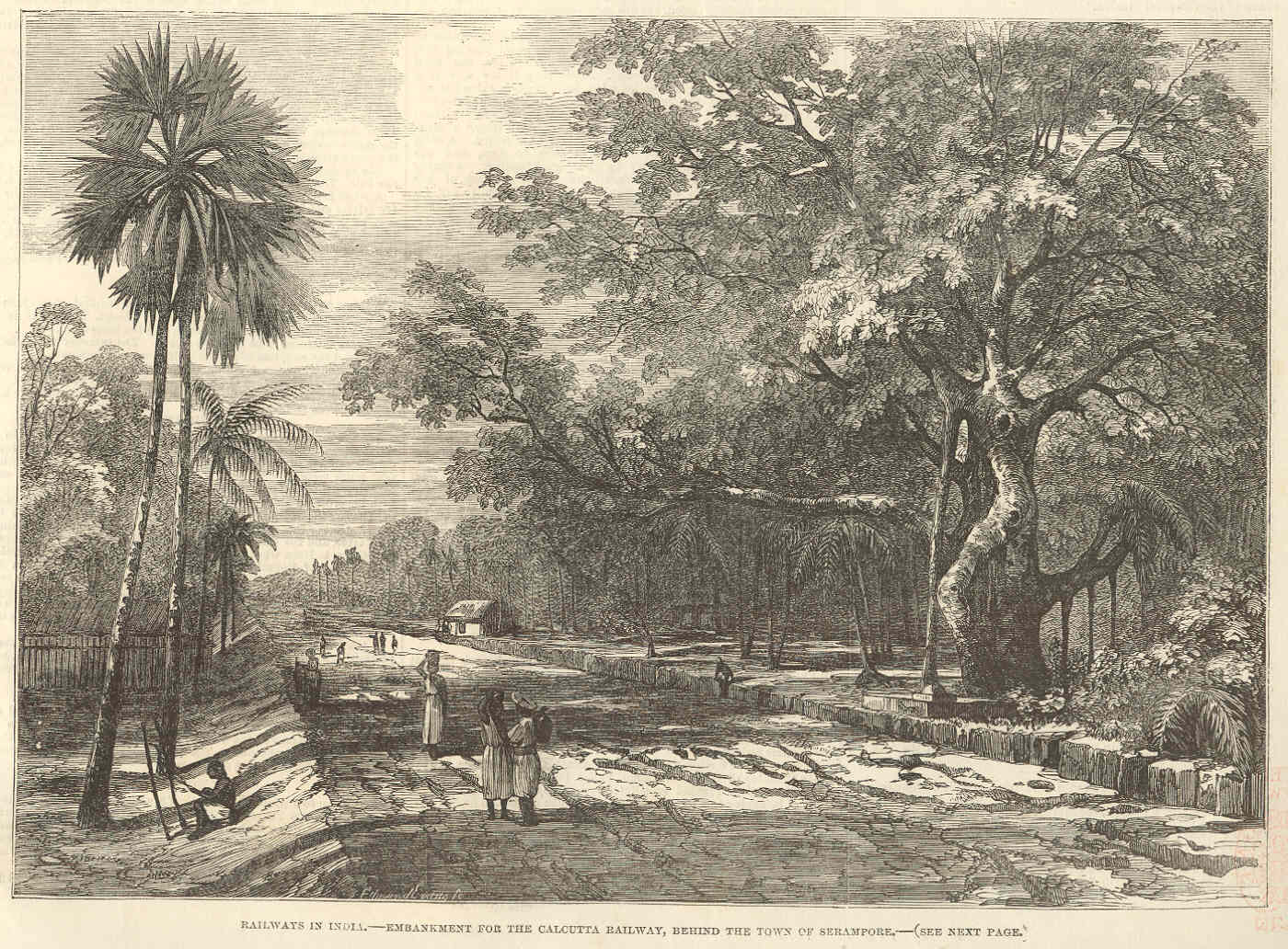
Embankment for the Calcutta Railway, behind the town of Serampore

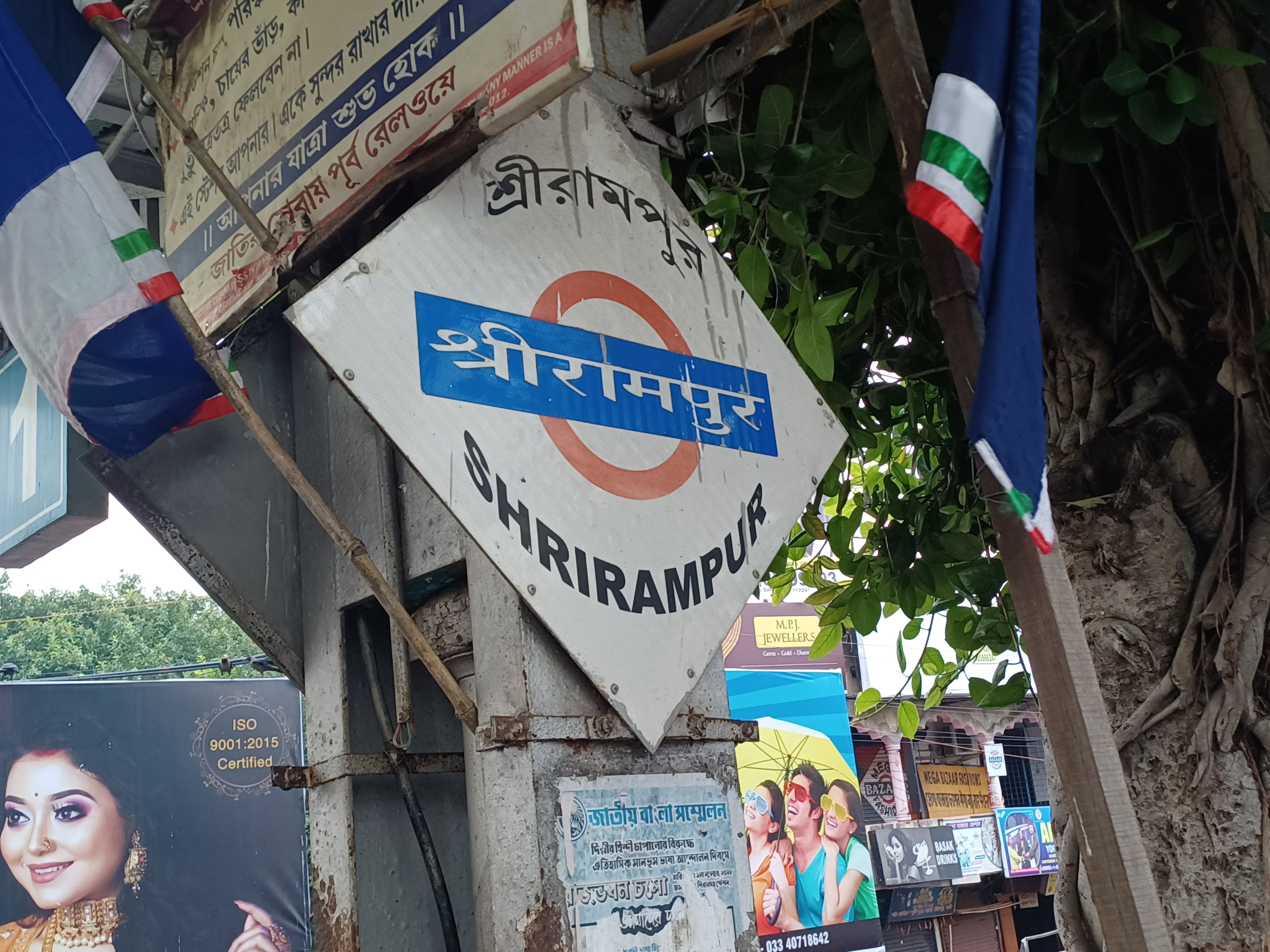
Shrirampur railway station board
