= Baidyabati railway station =

Railway station in West Bengal, India

Baidyabati
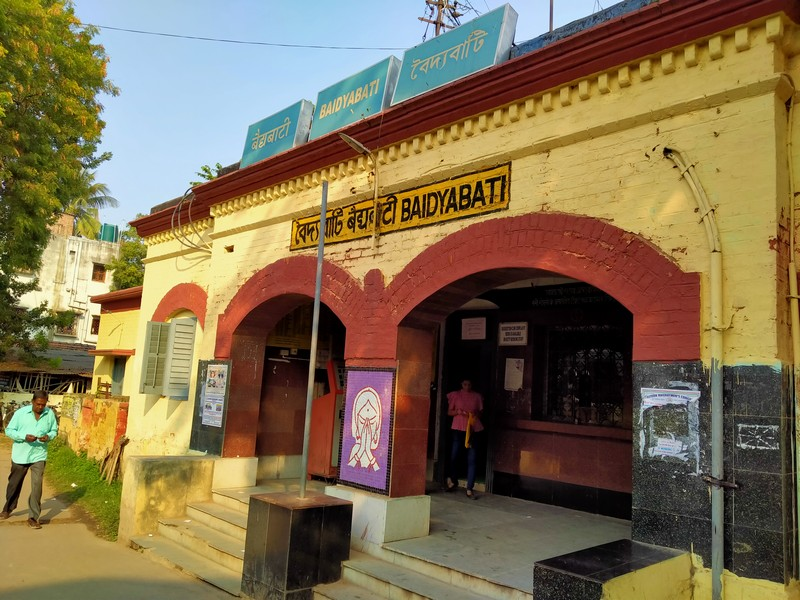

General information
- Location: Grand Trunk Road, Baidyabati, Hooghly district – 712222; Serampore, West Bengal; India
- Coordinates: 22°47′43″N 88°19′55″E
- Elevation: 17 metres (56 ft)
- System: Kolkata Suburban Railway
- Owner: Indian Railways
- Operator: Eastern Railway
- Line: Howrah–Bardhaman main line
- Platforms: 3

Construction
- Structure type: Standard (on-ground station)
- Parking: Yes
- Cycle facilities: Yes

Other information
- Status: Functioning
- Station code: BBAE
- Zone(s): Eastern
- Division(s): Howrah

History
- Opened: 1854
- Electrified: 1958
- Former names: East Indian Railway Company

Services
Preceding station	Kolkata Suburban Railway	Following station
Seoraphuli Junction towards Howrah Junction	Eastern Line Main line	Bhadreshwar towards Bandel Junction
Route map
Location
- Location within West Bengal Location within India

Baidyabati railway station is located on the Howrah–Bardhaman main line, in the Hooghly district of West Bengal, India. It is a standard, on-ground station, that serves the Baidyabati city.
