= Mankundu =

Neighbourhood in Hooghly, West Bengal, India

- Neighbourhood
- Location in West Bengal, India Mankundu (India)
- Coordinates: 22.84°N 88.34°E
- Country: India
- State: West Bengal
- Division: Burdwan
- District: Hooghly

Government
  - Type: Municipality
  - Body: Bhadreswar Municipality
- Elevation: 17 m (56 ft)

Languages
  - Official: Bengali, English
- Time zone: UTC+5:30 (IST)
- PIN: 712139
- Telephone code: +91 33
- Vehicle registration: WB
- Lok Sabha constituency: Hooghly
- Vidhan Sabha constituency: Chandannagar

Mankundu is a neighbourhood in Bhadreswar of Hooghly district in the Indian state of West Bengal. It is a part of the area covered by Kolkata Metropolitan Development Authority (KMDA).

== Etymology ==
The name Mankundu comes from a prehistoric era when King Man Singh sent a few soldiers to defeat the then mog dacoits in 17th era.

== Geography ==
Mankundu is situated in Latitude: 22°84'N & Longitude: 88°34'E.

== Education ==
Mankundu B.Ed. College, was established at Mankundu in 2011. Supreme Knowledge Foundation Group of Institutions, an engineering college, was established at Mankundu in 2009.

Pearl Rosary School, Techno India Group Public School, Mankundu Vivekananda Wisdom Mission School, was established at Mankundu in 2011.

== Transport ==
State Highway 6/ Grand Trunk Road passes through Mankundu. Private Bus number 2 (Chunchura Court - Dakshineswar) plies through here.

Mankundu railway station is on the Howrah-Bardhaman main line. It is part of Kolkata Suburban Railway system.
