= Mahrawa derailment =

2012 railway incident in Uttar Pradesh, India

Mihrawan derailment

Details
- Date: 31 May 2012; 13:13 IST (UTC+05:30)
- Location: Mihrawan, Uttar Pradesh
- Country: India
- Line: Varanasi–Jaunpur–Faizabad–Lucknow line
- Operator: Eastern Railway
- Incident type: Derailment
- Cause: Under Investigation

Statistics
- Trains: 1
- Deaths: 7
- Injured: 50+
- Damage: 5 coaches mangled, 2 more derailed

The Mihrawan derailment occurred on 31 May 2012, when seven coaches of the Dehradun bound Doon Express derailed near Mihrawan in the Jaunpur district of Uttar Pradesh, India. The accident took place at 1.13 PM killing four and injuring fifty more instantly. Reacting to the incident, Railway Ministry spokesman Anil Saxena told the press that "While four of the coaches got tilted, three of them derailed. So the coaches which are affected are the 11th onwards from the engine, up to the 17th coach". The region, where accident took place, does not have good road connectivity. Relief and rescue teams had to rush to the spot from Varanasi and Lucknow. On the possible cause for the accident, Railway Board member AP Mishra said that exact cause has to be ascertained. It could have been "due to excessive heat causing track expansion or some miscreant activity", he said, adding that the railway track could be cleared by the next morning. The train was heading towards Varanasi at the time of its derailment.

== Overview ==
=== Crash ===
On the evening after the crash, more detailed reports from various news agencies suggested that at least seven persons were killed and 24 others were injured in the accident. Reports said that the death and injury toll from the mishap could rise. According to the officials in Jaunpur district administration, seven coaches, which included seven sleepers and two general, had derailed. The officials said that the driver of the Doon Express had seen some distortion in the railway track and as a result, applied the brakes. Ten coaches along with the engine safely passed through the damaged track. However, seven coaches at the rear got derailed. The place where the accident took place is 35 km from Jaunpur railway station and 70 km from Varanasi. Officers of the district administration along with ambulances and medical care reached the spot in half an hour. Senior officials including the divisional railway manager from Lucknow also rushed to the spot. The railways dispatched three relief trains from Lucknow, Faizabad and Varanasi to the accident site in order to rescue stranded passengers and take them to either Lucknow or Varanasi. While around 200 passengers were rescued by the local villagers before arrival of the officials, over 500 were said to be still trapped in the damaged coaches.

=== Probing ===
Reacting to the incident, Union Railway Minister Mukul Roy has said that sabotage cannot be ruled out of the list of probabilities. Earlier, West Bengal Chief Minister Mamata Banerjee also demanded a probe into the incident pointing that it happened on a day when a nationwide bandh had been enforced by NDA and Left parties. "Since the accident has taken place during a country-wide bandh we want this to be probed. Who has caused this mishap? It has to be seen whether this is truly an accident or an incident", said Ms Banerjee who was Railways Minister herself till she was elected chief minister in 2011. Railways Minister Mukul Roy left for the accident site while he ordered a high-level probe into the accident. "I have ordered a high-level inquiry to find out why such repeated accidents are happening. We will take serious steps to prevent such accidents", he said. The minister also announced compensation of Rs.5 lakh for the families of each of those killed; Rs. 1 lakh for those injured and Rs. 25,000 for those who have sustained minor injuries. Eyewitnesses and villagers, who reached the accident site, said a loud sound was heard after the derailment, suggesting that the train was in high speed when the accident occurred. Of the five sleeper coaches that tilted, two were derailed. While villagers reached the site immediately after the accident to begin rescue operation, the district administration and railways could start the operation only after an hour.

== Recovery ==
Prima facie ruling out that the derailment of Doon Express was the handiwork of anti-social elements, the Railway Minister, Mr Mukul Roy, that night, said an inquiry into the incident would be conducted by the Commissioner of Railway Safety and stern action would be taken against the guilty. Mr Roy visited the district hospital in the wee hours and inquired about the well-being of the passengers injured in the accident. He said that expenses for the treatment of those seriously injured would be borne by the Railway Ministry. Finally, on 2 June, the movement of trains between Lucknow and Varanasi has been restored. More than 20 trains were either diverted, short-terminated or cancelled for two days, after the route got blocked due to derailment.
