= Chandannagar railway station =

Railway station in West Bengal, India

Chandannagar
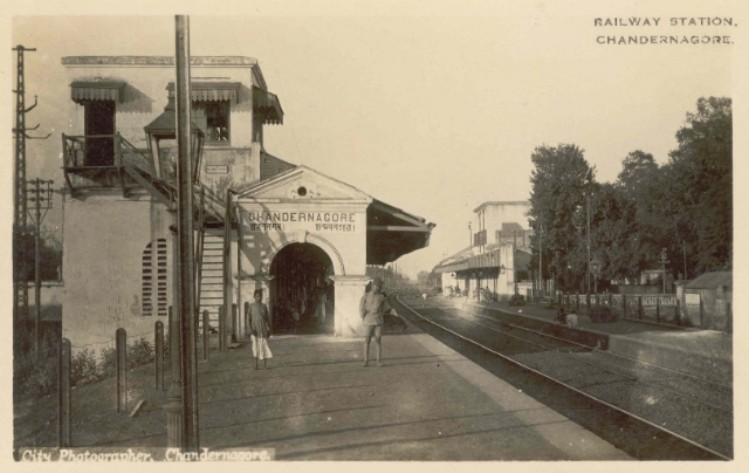
- Chandannagar Station

General information
- Location: Chandannagar Station Rd, Fatakgora, Hooghly, West Bengal; India
- Coordinates: 22°52′01″N 88°21′14″E
- Elevation: 16 metres (52 ft)
- System: Kolkata Suburban Railway station
- Owner: Indian Railways
- Operator: Eastern Railway
- Line: Howrah–Bardhaman main line
- Platforms: 3
- Tracks: 4 (one is loop line and three of them is main line)

Construction
- Structure type: Standard (on-ground station)
- Parking: Yes
- Cycle facilities: Yes
- Accessible: Yes

Other information
- Status: Functioning
- Station code: CGR
- Division(s): Howrah

History
- Opened: 1854
- Electrified: 1958
- Former names: East Indian Railway Company

Services
Preceding station	Kolkata Suburban Railway	Following station
Mankundu towards Howrah Junction	Eastern Line Main line	Chuchura towards Bandel Junction
Route map
Location
- Location within West Bengal Location within India

Chandannagar railway station is a Kolkata Suburban Railway station on the Howrah–Bardhaman main line. It is located in Hooghly district in the Indian state of West Bengal. It is under the jurisdiction of Eastern Railway zone. Chandannagar railway station is located on the Howrah - Bandel line stretch. It serves Chandannagar and surrounding areas. It is 33 km from Howrah Station. The length of Platform no. 1 is 352 metres and Platform No. 2 & 3 is 353 metres.The station has wifi connection provided by Google and Indian Railways in Platform No. 1. Most of the suburban trains, some passenger trains and few express trains halts here.

== History ==
This station is one of the oldest railway stations in West Bengal, along with Howrah.

It is one of the main stoppages of Howrah–Barddhaman main line and is greatly known for Jagadhatri Puja.

The first passenger train in eastern India ran from Howrah to Hooghly on 15 August 1854. The track was extended to Raniganj by 1855.

This station was first established by the French colony and named as "Chandannagore Railway Station". Although located in a French territory, the station and the land on which the tracks were laid was kept under British jurisdiction. After the French left in May 1950, the station renamed as Chandannagar Railway station.

East Indian Railway Company started construction of a line out of Howrah for the proposed link with Delhi via Rajmahal and Mirzapur in 1851.

== Long distance trains ==
These superfast or long distances trains are available in the station:-

1. 13021 Howrah Raxaul Mithila Express

2. 13009- 13010 Howrah Yog Nagari Rishikesh Doon Express

3. 53047 Viswabharati Fast Passenger

== Electrification ==
Electrification of Howrah—Burdwan main line was completed with 25 kV AC overhead system in 1958.
