= Seoraphuli Junction railway station =

Railway station in West Bengal, India

Seoraphuli Junction
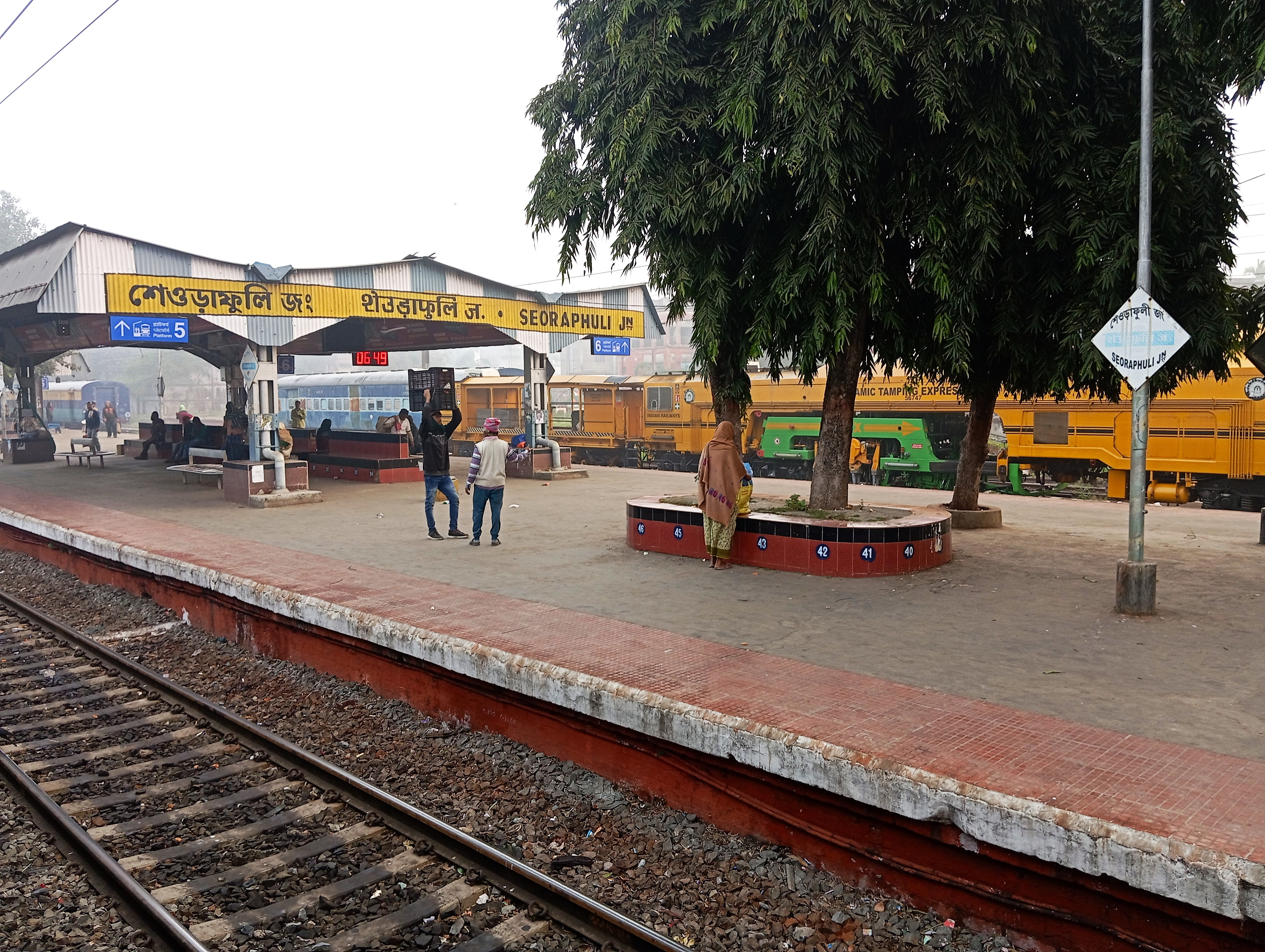
- Seoraphuli Junction railway station platform

General information
- Location: Grand Trunk Road, Sheoraphuli, Hooghly district – 712223, West Bengal; India
- Coordinates: 22°46′29″N 88°19′42″E
- Elevation: 13 metres (43 ft)
- System: Kolkata Suburban Railway junction station
- Owner: Indian Railways
- Operator: Eastern Railway
- Lines: Howrah–Bardhaman main line Sheoraphuli–Bishnupur branch line
- Platforms: 6
- Tracks: 9

Construction
- Structure type: At grade
- Parking: No
- Cycle facilities: Yes

Other information
- Status: Functioning
- Station code: SHE
- Zone(s): Eastern Railway
- Division(s): Howrah

History
- Opened: 1854
- Electrified: 1958
- Former names: East Indian Railway Company

Passengers
- Busy

Services
Preceding station	Kolkata Suburban Railway	Following station
Shrirampur towards Howrah Junction	Eastern Line Main line & Sheoraphuli–Tarakeswar branch line	Baidyabati towards Bandel Junction
Shrirampur towards Howrah Junction	Eastern Line Main line & Sheoraphuli–Tarakeswar branch line	Diara towards Goghat
Route map
Location
- Location within West Bengal Location within India

Seoraphuli Junction railway station is a Kolkata Suburban Railway station on the Howrah–Bardhaman main line in Hooghly district in the Indian state of West Bengal. It serves Sheoraphuli area & northern part of the Serampore City. The Sheoraphuli–Tarakeswar branch line meets Howrah–Bardhaman main line at Sheoraphuli.

== History ==
The first passenger train in eastern India ran from Howrah to Hooghly on 15 August 1854. The track was extended to Raniganj by 1855.

The broad-gauge Sheoraphuli–Tarakeswar branch line was opened by the Tarkessur Railway Company on 1 January 1885 and was worked by East Indian Railway Company. Testing of electric locomotives with some coaches on section Belur to Konnagar commenced on 10 November 1957. On four suburban trains, hauled by electric locomotives, introduced on the section Howrah to Sheoraphuli from 1 December 1957, a saving of 11 minutes per run compared to steam services was achieved.

== Electrification ==
Electrification of Howrah–Burdwan main line was completed with 3 kV DC overhead system in 1958. Howrah–Sheoraphuli–Tarakeswar line was electrified in 1957–58. It was converted to 25 kV AC in the 1970s

== Trains ==
The following Express/Superfast trains halt at Sheoraphuli railway station (SHE) in both directions:

- 13017/18 Ganadevata Express (HWH - AZ)
- 13021/22 Mithila Express (RXL - HWH)
- 13031/32 Howrah-Jaynagar Express (HWH - JYG)
- 13049/50 Howrah-Amritsar Express (HWH - ASR)
- 22387/88 Black Diamond Express (HWH - DHN)
