= Doon Express =

Train in India

Overview
- Service type: Express
- First service: 1 December 1901; 124 years ago
- Current operator: Eastern Railway

Route
- Termini: Howrah Junction (HWH); Yog Nagari Rishikesh (YNRK)
- Stops: 71 (Up); 74 (Down)
- Distance travelled: 1,533 km (953 mi)
- Average journey time: 34 hours 05 minutes
- Service frequency: Daily
- Train number: 13009 / 13010

On-board services
- Classes: AC First Class, AC 2 Tier, AC 3 Tier, Sleeper Class, General Unreserved
- Seating arrangements: Yes
- Sleeping arrangements: Yes
- Catering facilities: On-board catering, E-catering
- Observation facilities: Large windows
- Baggage facilities: Available
- Other facilities: Below the seats

Technical
- Rolling stock: LHB coach
- Track gauge: 1,676 mm (5 ft 6 in)
- Operating speed: 45 km/h (28 mph) average including halts.

The 13009 / 13010 Doon Express is an express train belonging to Indian Railways – Eastern Railway zone that runs between Howrah Junction & Yog Nagari Rishikesh railway station in India.

It operates as train number 13009 from Howrah Junction to Yog Nagari Rishikesh and as train number 13010 in the reverse direction, serving the states of West Bengal, Jharkhand, Bihar, Uttar Pradesh & Uttarakhand.

== Coaches ==
The 13009/13010 Doon Express presently has 1 AC First Class, 1 AC 2 tier, 5 AC 3 tier, 8 Sleeper class, 4 General Unreserved, 1 SLR (Seating cum Luggage Rake) coaches. It does not have a pantry car.

As is customary with most train services in India, coach composition may be amended at the discretion of Indian Railways depending on demand.

== Service ==
The 13009 Doon Express covers the distance of 1533 kilometres in 34 hours 45 minutes (46.48 km/h) and 34 hours 5 minutes as 13010 Doon Express (46.48 km/h).

As the average speed of the train is below 55 km/h, as per Indian Railways rules, its fare does not include a Superfast surcharge.

== Routing ==
The 13009/13010 Doon Express runs from Howrah Junction via Chandannagar, Bandel Junction, Barddhaman Junction, Asansol Junction, Dhanbad Junction, Gomoh Junction, Koderma Junction, Gaya Junction, Pt. Deen Dayal Upadhyaya Junction, Varanasi Junction, Jaunpur Junction, Akbarpur Junction, Ayodhya Junction, Lucknow Charbagh, Shahjahanpur Junction, Bareilly Junction, Moradabad Junction, Najibabad Junction, Laksar Junction, Haridwar to Yog Nagari Rishikesh.

== Traction ==
Earlier it was hauled by a Bhagat Ki Kothi-based WDP-4B. As the route is now fully electrified, it is hauled by a Howrah Loco Shed based WAP-5 / WAP-7 electric locomotive from Howrah to Yog Nagari Rishikesh and vice versa.

== Timings ==
- 13009 Doon Express leaves Howrah on a daily basis at 20:25 hrs IST and reaches Yog Nagari Rishikesh at 07:10 hrs IST on the 3rd day.
- 13010 Doon Express leaves Yog Nagari Rishikesh on a daily basis at 20:55 hrs IST and reaches Howrah at 07:00 hrs IST on the 3rd day.

== Accidents ==
On 31 May 2012, 5 people died and 50 were injured when the train derailed at Mahrawa station.

On 28 April 2014, the Doon Express derailed close to Zafarganj station near Ambedkar Nagar in Uttar Pradesh killing 3 and injuring 6 people.
