= Hooghly railway station =

Railway Station in West Bengal, India

Hooghly
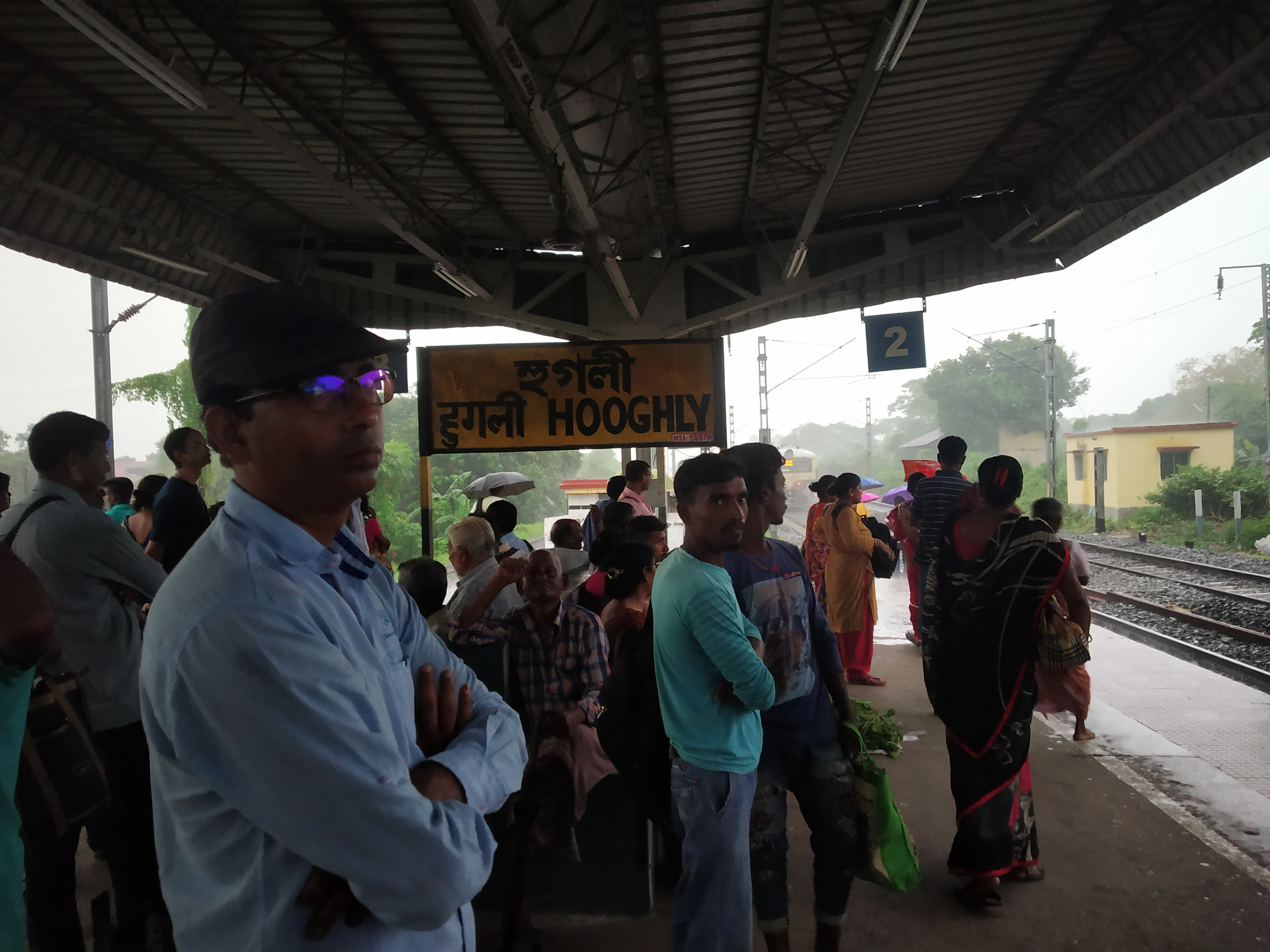
- Hooghly station

General information
- Location: Hooghly station road, Hooghly, West Bengal; India
- Coordinates: 22°54′21″N 88°22′34″E
- Elevation: 14 metres (46 ft)
- System: Kolkata Suburban Railway Station
- Owner: Indian Railways
- Operator: Eastern Railway
- Line: Howrah–Bardhaman main line
- Platforms: 3
- Tracks: 3

Construction
- Structure type: Standard (on ground station)
- Parking: No
- Cycle facilities: Yes

Other information
- Status: Functioning
- Station code: HGY
- Division(s): Howrah

History
- Opened: 1854
- Electrified: 1958
- Former names: East Indian Railway Company

Services
Preceding station	Kolkata Suburban Railway	Following station
Chuchura towards Howrah Junction	Eastern Line Main line	Bandel Junction Terminus
Route map
Location
- Location within West Bengal Location within India

Hooghly is a Kolkata Suburban Railway station on the Howrah–Bardhaman main line. It is located in Hooghly district in the Indian state of West Bengal. It serves Hugli-Chuchura and surrounding areas.

== History ==
East Indian Railway Company started construction of a line out of Howrah for the proposed link with Delhi via Rajmahal and Mirzapur in 1851.

The first passenger train in eastern India ran from Howrah to Hooghly on 15 August 1854. The track was extended to Raniganj by 1855.

Here is a short description of the first regular train in eastern India:

From 15 August 1854, the company ran a regular service, morning and evening, between Haora and Hugli with stops at Bali, Shrirampur and Chandannagar. The fare ranged from three rupees by first class to seven annas by third class. The service was extended in stages, reaching Raniganj on 3 February 1855... Three thousand people applied for tickets on the first train out of Haora in 1854: only a small portion could be accommodated. Thousands of men and women lined the whole stretch of track to see the fire-breathing iron horse.

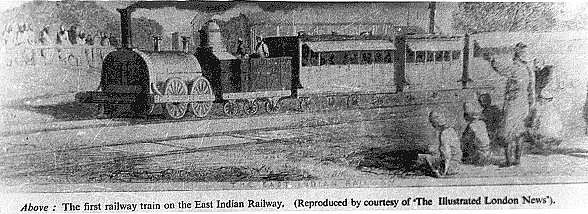
First train of the East Indian Railway, 1854

== Electrification ==
Electrification of Howrah–Burdwan main line was completed with 25 kV AC overhead system in 1958.
