= Bandel Junction railway station =

Railway Station in West Bengal, India

Bandel Junction
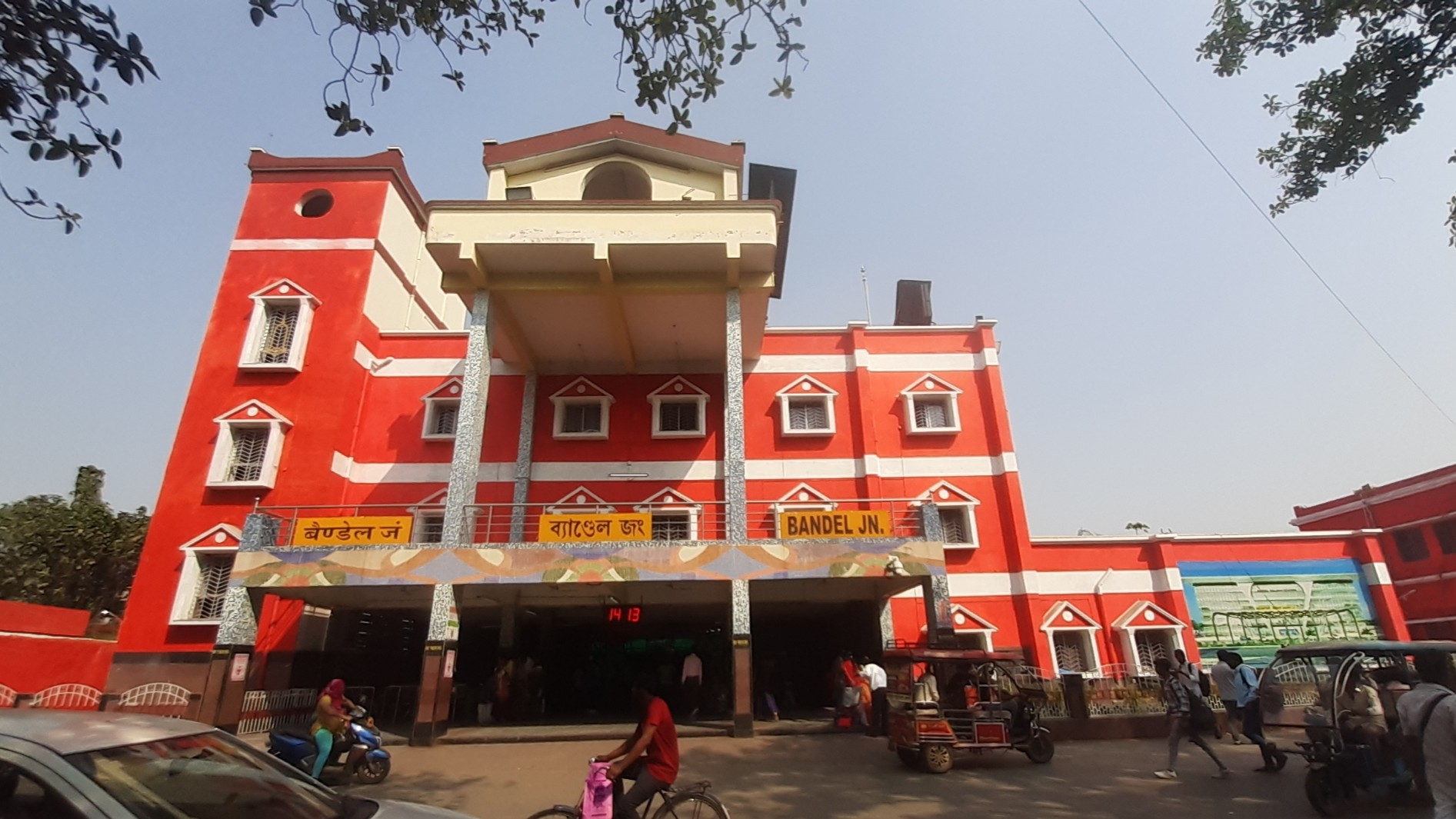
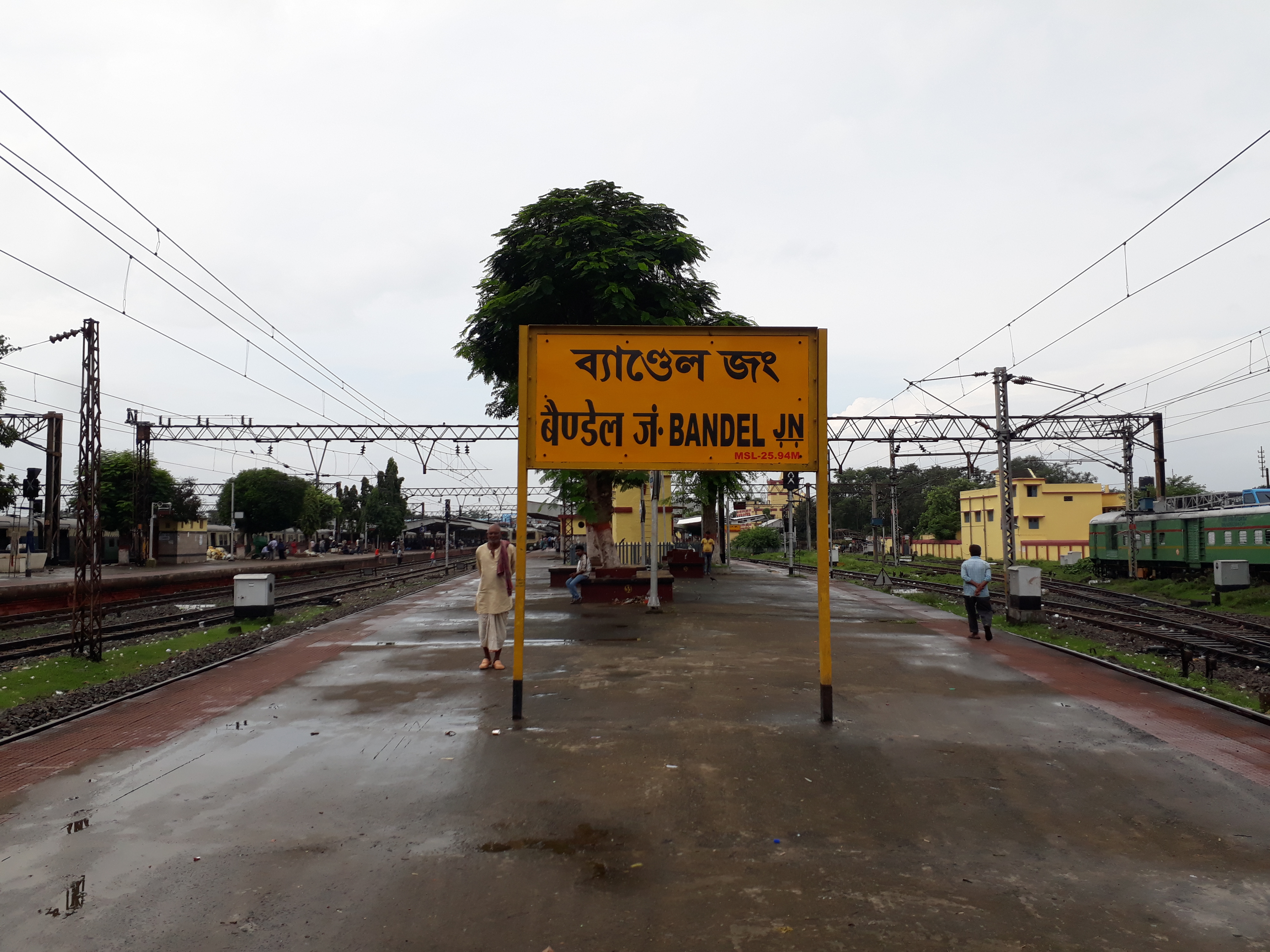
- Bandel Railway Station Front (top) and Bandel Junction Platform 2 (bottom)

General information
- Location: Bandel Station Road, Bandel, Hooghly, West Bengal; India
- Coordinates: 22.923200°N 88.378459°E
- Elevation: 14 metres (46 ft)
- System: Kolkata Suburban Railway
- Owner: Indian Railways
- Operator: Eastern Railway
- Lines: Howrah–Bardhaman main line; Bandel–Katwa line; Naihati–Bandel line (Hooghly Branch line) via the Sampreeti Bridge (previously via the Jubilee Bridge); Grand Chord; Sealdah–Ranaghat line (line completed, trains not started from Bandel); Howrah–New Jalpaiguri line
- Platforms: 7 (planned extension up to 16): Available for all trains: 1-5, 7; Available for certain trains: 6; Planned: 8-16
- Tracks: 43
- Connections: Bus; Auto-rickshaw & E-rickshaw; RRTS & Metro (planned)

Construction
- Structure type: At grade
- Parking: Available
- Cycle facilities: Available
- Accessible: Yes

Other information
- Status: Functioning on large scale
- Station code: BDC
- Zone(s): Eastern Railway
- Division(s): Howrah

History
- Opened: 1854; 172 years ago (oldest station along with Howrah)
- Electrified: 1957; 69 years ago
- Former names: East Indian Railway

Passengers
- 39M/Year: 105K/Day (▲ high)
Services
Preceding station	Kolkata Suburban Railway	Following station
Hooghly towards Howrah Junction	Eastern Line Main line	Adisaptagram towards Barddhaman Junction
Hooghly Ghat towards Sealdah	Eastern Line Bandel–Katwa line	Bans Beria towards Katwa Junction
Route map
Location
- Location within West Bengal Location within India

Bandel Junction railway station (abbreviated as Bandel Jn) is a major junction station of the Kolkata Suburban Railway network, India. It is situated on the Howrah–Bandel–Barddhaman main line in Hooghly district with an approximate 40 kilometres (25 mi) distance from Howrah railway station. The station is operated by the Howrah railway division. A 16-line Loco shed and 14-line freight yard is also present. There are seven platforms at Bandel Junction station. However, platform number 6 can accommodate only the 9-coach EMU trains so most of the 9-coach Bandel–Naihati locals depart from that platform. Bandel station is also connected to the Sealdah railway division by the Bandel-Naihati-Sealdah line. Only weekly express trains operate from the station. The number of daily halting trains at this station is about 100. Bandel Junction has about 6 originating local trains. The next junction towards Howrah is Seoraphuli Junction. The next junction towards Barddhaman is Katwa Junction. And the next junction towards Sealdah is Naihati Junction. The station is fully electrified.

Bandel Junction is the busiest and largest railway station in Hooghly district. The stations larger than it are Howrah, Sealdah, Kolkata, Barddhaman Junction, Kharagpur Junction and probably Asansol Junction. Bandel Jn is one of the busiest railway stations in Eastern Railway zone.

== Trains ==
This is a list of the important trains that halt at Bandel Junction. The trains can also be in their opposite stations (for example, Bandel-Howrah Local can also be written as Howrah-Bandel Local). 6 local trains originate from Bandel Junction. The trains operating on the lines are given below.

=== Local Trains ===
==== Howrah–Bardhaman main line ====
- Bally–Bandel Local
- Bandel–Howrah Local
- Bandel–Memari Local
- Bandel–Barddhaman Local
- Barddhaman–Howrah Local
- Howrah–Barddhaman Galloping Local

==== Bandel–Katwa line ====
- Bandel–Katwa Local
- Katwa–Sealdah Galloping Local
- Howrah–Katwa Galloping Local

==== Naihati–Bandel line (Hooghly Branch line) ====
- Naihati–Bandel Local

*The trains in italic above are the originating local trains from Bandel Junction.

=== Express Trains ===
==== Howrah–New Jalpaiguri line ====
- Azimganj Kavi Guru Express (Howrah–Azimganj)
- Azimganj–Howrah Passenger
- Ganadevta Express (Howrah–Azimganj)
- Howrah–Balurghat Express (Balurghat–Howrah)
- Sealdah–Jangipur Road Express (Sealdah–Jangipur Road)
- Kolkata–Radhikapur Express (Radhikapur–Kolkata)
- Howrah–Malda Town Intercity Express (Howrah–Malda Town)
- Paharia Express (Digha–New Jalpaiguri)
- Teesta Torsa Express (New Alipurduar–Sealdah)
- Kamakhya-Howrah Sleeper Vande Bharat Express

==== Grand Chord ====
- Bagh Express (Howrah–Kathgodam)
- Ballia–Sealdah Express
- Black Diamond Express (Howrah–Dhanbad)
- Doon Express (Yog Nagari Rishikesh–Howrah)
- Ganga Sagar Express (Jaynagar–Sealdah)
- Gaya–Howrah Express
- Hate Bazare Express (Sealdah–Saharsa)
- Howrah–Katihar Express
- Howrah–Mokama Express
- Kamrup Express (Dibrugarh–Howrah)
- Howrah–Katihar Weekly Express (Howrah–Katihar)
- Kolkata–Azamgarh Weekly Express (Kolkata–Azamgarh)
- Mithila Express (Raxaul–Howrah)
- Purvanchal Express (Gorakhpur–Kolkata)

=== Sources ===
- Where Is My Train
- India Rail Info

== Station Layout ==
=== Main Building ===
The station building is the main entrance to Bandel Junction. The platforms can also be accessed from outside. Streets and roads are located in front of the building. The platforms can be accessed by going through an underground passage. The platforms are located above the usual station elevation. The platforms can be accessed by using the stairs. The first stairs lead to platform 1 and 2. The second stairs lead to platform 3 and 4. The third and final stairs lead to platform 5, 6 and 7. Stalls and shops can be found on the platforms. Over bridges with escalators can be found on the platforms. Inside the main building, various artworks can be found. The main building also has multiple floors, but those can only be accessed by authorized personnel. The building also has waiting places and water facilities. A screen is also present in the station building that displays the incoming trains. A pay and use toilet is also present. The main station building used to be painted light yellow with stripes of dark red. But now the whole station building is painted red.

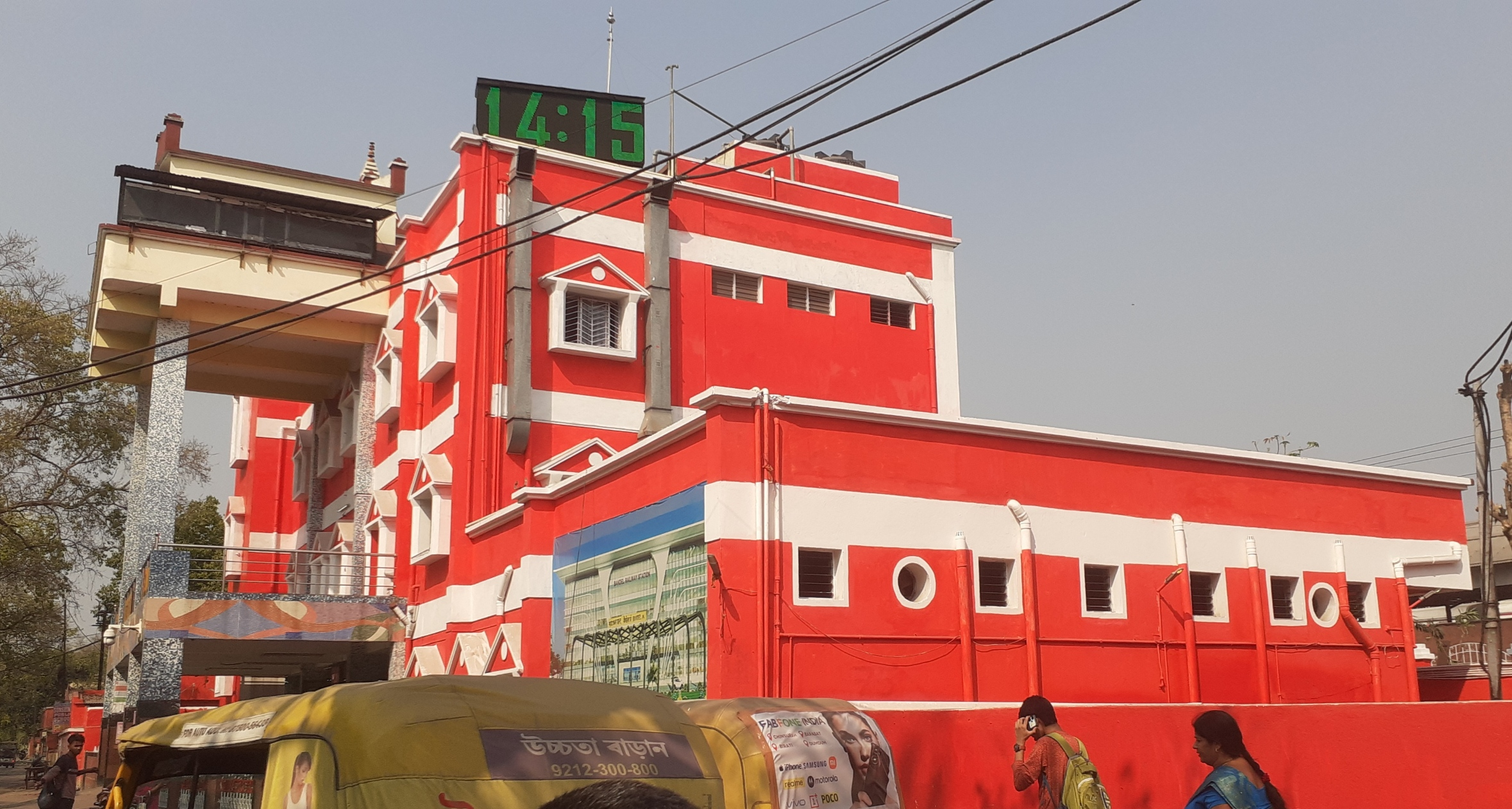
Bandel Junction main building, as seen from the side

=== Ticket Counter Building ===
The ticket counter building can be found just to the right of Bandel Junction. Tickets for the trains can be bought here by either going to the ticket counters or by using the available ticket machines. Previously, this building had 4 entrances. Now, it only has two entrances to the right, the two entrances on the left are covered. This building has two floors. Like the main building, this station also used to be painted light yellow with red, but it is now painted red.

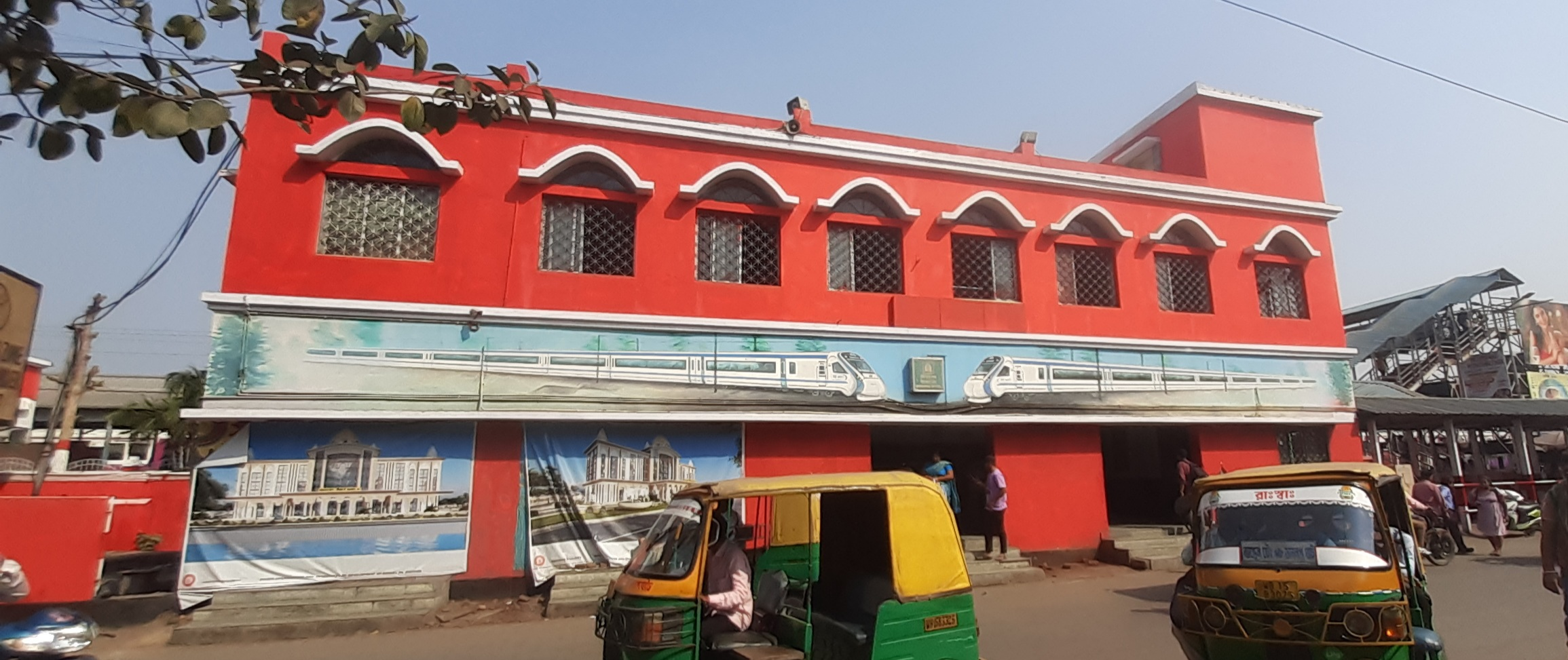
Bandel Junction Ticket Counter Building

=== Platforms ===
There are 7 platforms at Bandel Junction. They can be accessed via the main building or by the over bridge beside the ticket counter building. All the platforms expect platform 6 are located side-by-side, 2 at a time. All the platforms are of varying length. Platform 1 and 2 are about 420 metres, platform 3 and 4 are about 530 metres, platform 5 and 7 are about 600 metres and platform 6 is unknown but is approximately 320 metres. The over bridge located beside the ticket counter allows access to all the platforms.

Refreshment stalls and shops can be found on the platforms, some are active even at night. The good's shed and the Adani Food processing plants can be seen from the platforms and over bridges. Beside the platforms, especially platform 1 and 2, railway models and artworks can be found. Multiple cabins are found near the railway station.

=== Outside ===
Outside the buildings lay roads and streets which only auto-rickshaws, cars, bikes and people can go through. E-rickshaws are generally not allowed to go much further into the station roads. Beside the ticket building is a staircase leading to an over bridge which is another way of going into the platforms. The station can be accessed through the Bandel More side by going through a subway. The subway has one exit and one entrance lane. Although there could be trouble accessing the station during rainy season. Because the water drainage system in the subways are not well maintained. The station can be accessed from the Kazidanga side and Debanandapur side without such trouble.

To the right of the ticket office, there is a parking for auto-rickshaws. Numerous auto-rickshaws are present here at all times. Most of them go to different places. Furthermore, to the right of the auto-rickshaw parking zone, is a tent-like covered in canopy where bikes and bicycles can be stored. Auto-rickshaws can also usually be seen passing in front of the station. Some autos are even parked in front of the station building. As for cars, there isn't a dedicate spot for them but can be parked in front of the station.

Source: Google Maps for this whole section

== Other Amenities ==
=== Adani Food Processing Plant ===
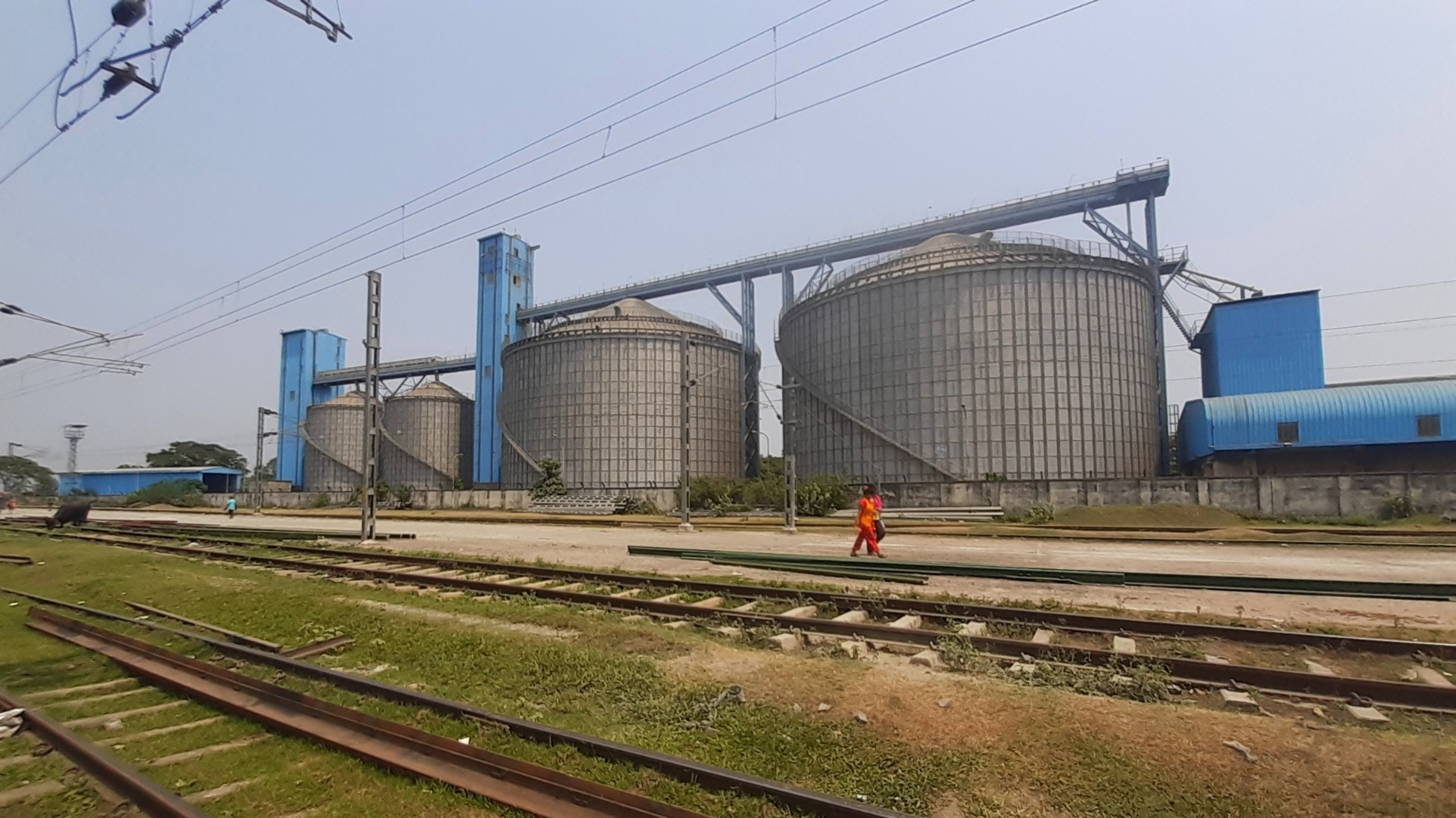
Adani Food Processing Plant, Bandel

The Adani Food Processing Plant is a huge plant located to the east of the station. It is also called Adani Agri Logistics Ltd. It is situated right next to the railway tracks and not much farther away from the station. It is a food processing plant owned by Adani Group. The plant itself is not very large, but the road in front of it makes it larger. The road is built in order for lorries to pass through and stop. Trucks and lorries stop on the road to import and export food. Numerous lorries stop at the plant on each active day. Because the plant is closed on some days, usually holidays. The plant itself can be seen from far away from the top of the roof of any two or three-storied building. It also provides storage facilities. The plant was established in 2009.

- Products: Wheat flour, wheat flour products and organic wheat flour for different companies
- Type: Warehouse / Depot and Supplier
- Annual turnover: ₹25–100 crore
- Manager; Quality Executive: Subhas Chakraborty; Kuntal Sarkar
- Sources: and Google Maps

=== EMU Carshed ===
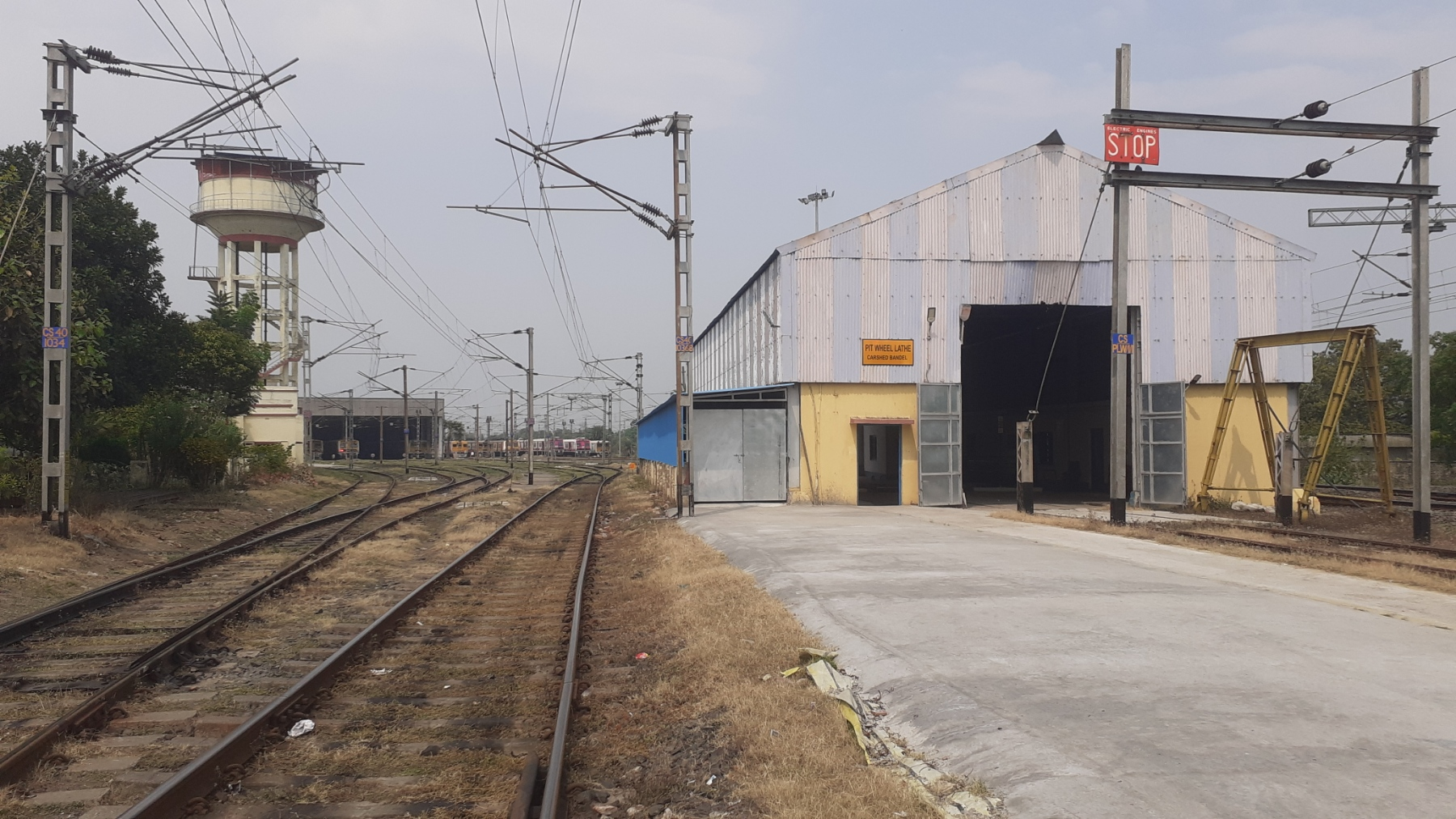
Bandel EMU Carshed

An EMU Carshed can be found in Bandel. It is 1.6 kilometres (0.99 mi) away from Bandel Jn to the north. It is owned and managed by Eastern Railway. This carshed is responsible for repairing trains. Trains have to follow separate tracks to go into the carshed. Trains going through the Bandel–Katwa line separate from the Bardhaman–Howrah main line through the railroad switch in front of the carshed. It is one of the 6 carsheds of Eastern Railway Zone. It is situated in Iswarbaha, a locality of Bansberia, it is the northern neighbouring place of Keota. The carshed itself is quite big but it is the same size as Bandel Junction. It is located just beside the Howrah–Barddhaman main line and can be seen if passing through that line. It can be partially seen from Bandel–Katwa line as well. It is one of the two carsheds located in Howrah Division.

- Capacity: 18 rakes
- Main Source: Google Maps

=== Bandel Goods Shed ===
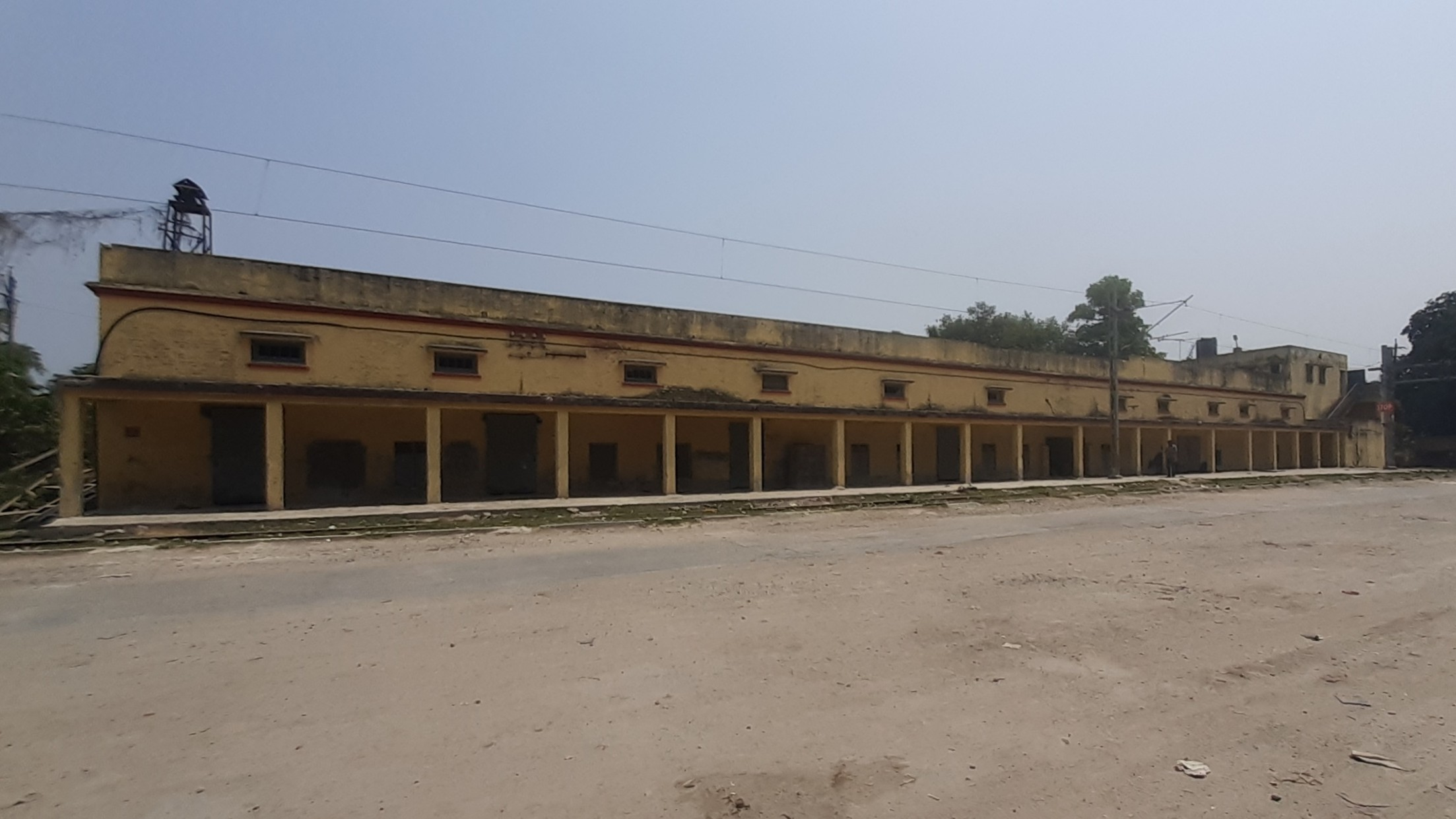
Bandel Goods Shed

The goods shed of Bandel Junction is located just below or south of the Adani food processing plant. It is not connected to the railway tracks. It marks the beginning of the road for lorries that go into the Adani food processing plant. It stores and imports/exports goods for Bandel Jn. The tender value of the goods of all time of the goods shed is ₹ 2.94 crore or US$ 342,000. The shed was closed on 11 November 2024. It is said to undergo major transformation and upgradation changes like the rest of Bandel Jn. It is managed by a sectional Senior Divisional Engineer and falls under Howrah Division.

- Earnest Money: ₹297,100 or US$3,450
- Building type; Ownership type: Warehouse; Public
- Sources: and Google Maps

== Transformation Designs ==
Bandel is suggested by many posters around the station and also by articles on the internet to transform into a much-improved railway station. The station is suggested to be transformed into a much bigger station in itself. Currently there are two suggested designs for Bandel Junction.

=== Transformation Design 1 ===
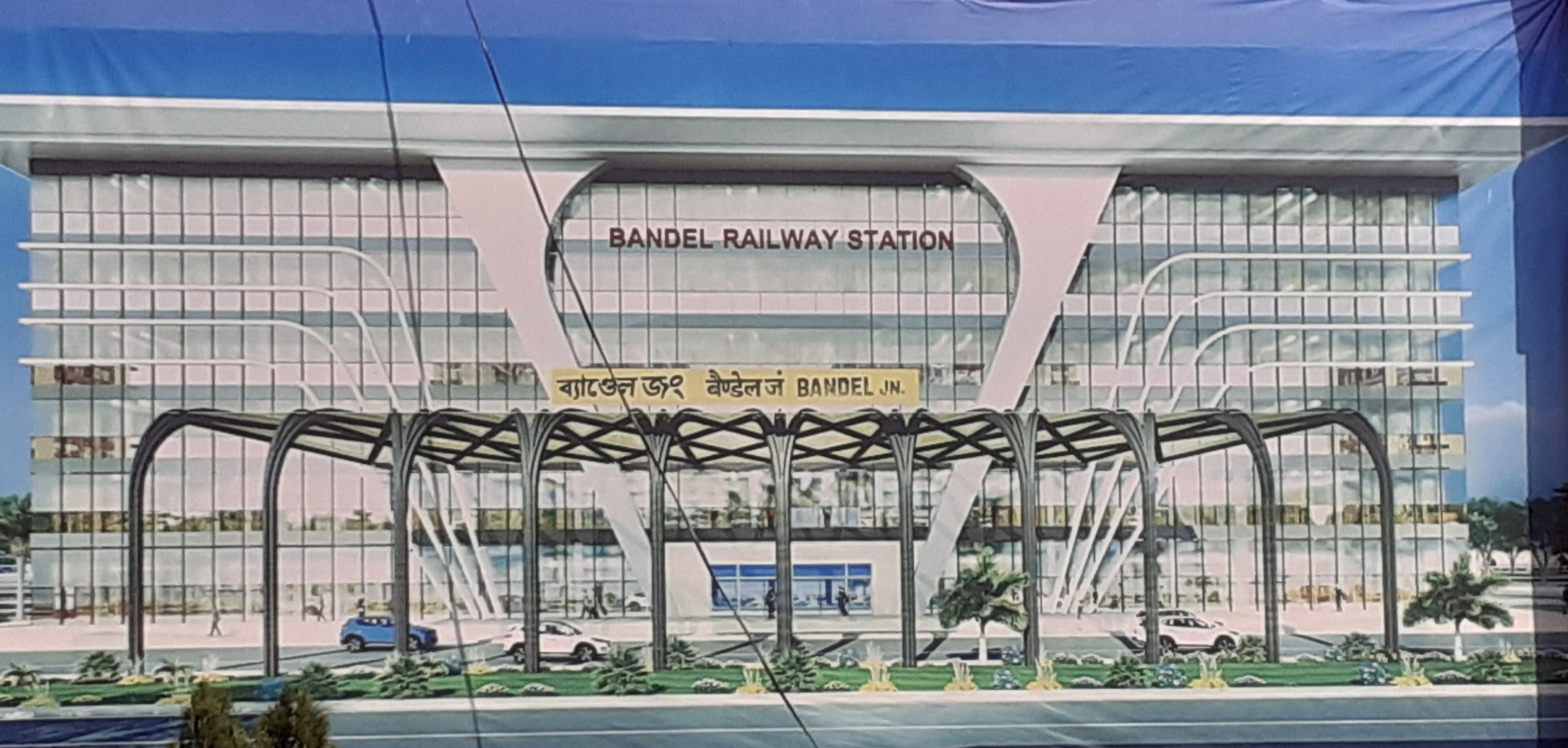
Primary Transformation Design for Bandel Junction

The Primary Design for Bandel would make it a world-class railway station. The primary design for Bandel Junction suggests that it will be luxury and designed much like that of an airport. The roads would also be widened to fit more cars with a patch of greenery in between. The background of the primary design is not accurate, because it has greenery in the background instead of the platforms. The design poster pasted in front of the main building replaced an existing artwork.

=== Transformation Design 2 ===
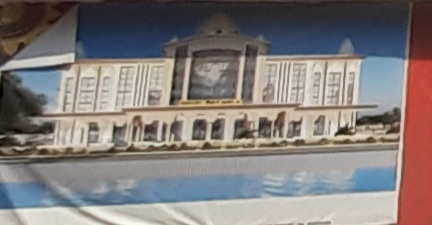
Another Transformation Design for Bandel Junction

There is a Second Transformation Design available for Bandel Junction. It would make the station look like a Hindu Temple (mandir). This poster is pasted on one of the blocked entrances on the front of the Ticket Counter Building. According to this design, there would be water in front of it.

== See also ==
- Bandel
- Howrah railway station
- Kolkata Suburban Railway
- Sealdah
- Express Trains in India
