= Howrah–Barddhaman main line =

Railway route in West Bengal, India

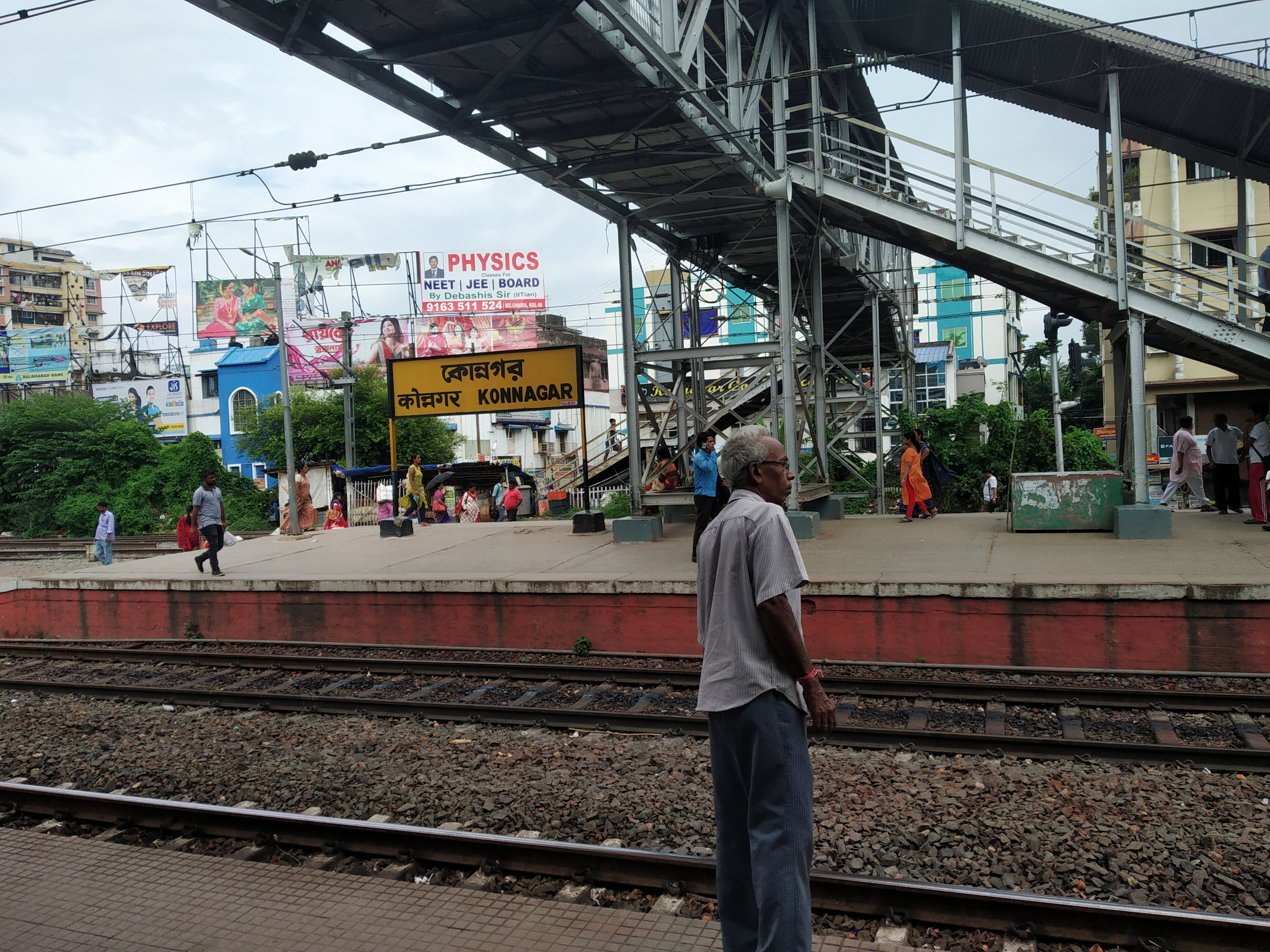
- Konnagar is an important station in the route.

Overview
- Status: Operational
- Owner: Indian Railways
- Locale: West Bengal
- Termini: Howrah; Barddhaman
- Stations: 34

Service
- System: Commuter rail
- Operator: Eastern Railway

History
- Opened: 1854

Technical
- Line length: 108 km (67 mi)
- Number of tracks: 4
- Track gauge: 5 ft 6 in (1,676 mm) broad gauge
- Electrification: 1958 with 25 kV AC
- Operating speed: up to 110 km/ h

The Howrah–Barddhaman main line is a broad-gauge railway line connecting Howrah and Barddhaman via Bandel. The 107 kilometres (66 mi) railway line operates in Howrah, Hooghly and Purba Barddhaman districts in the Indian state of West Bengal. It is part of the Howrah–Delhi main line and the Kolkata Suburban Railway system.

== History ==
The East Indian Railway Company which was formed on 1 June 1845, planned to construct a line from Howrah to Delhi. After surveys, construction began in 1851.

Howrah station was a tin shed and to reach it from Kolkata one had to cross the Hooghly River in a ferry. On 15 August 1854, the first passenger train in the eastern section was operated up to Hooghly railway station, 39 kilometres (24 mi) away. On 1 February 1855 the first train ran from Howrah to Raniganj, 195 kilometres (121 mi) from Howrah.

=== Access to Howrah station ===
A pontoon bridge was built across the Hooghly River in 1874 to provide easy access to Howrah Station, and in 1943 the cantilever Howrah Bridge, later renamed Rabindra Setu, was built.

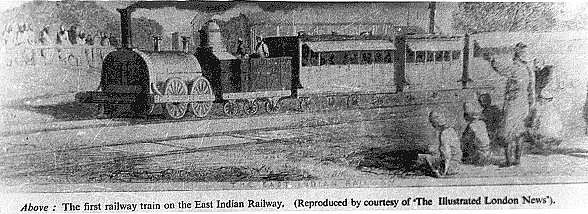
First train of the East Indian Railway, 1854

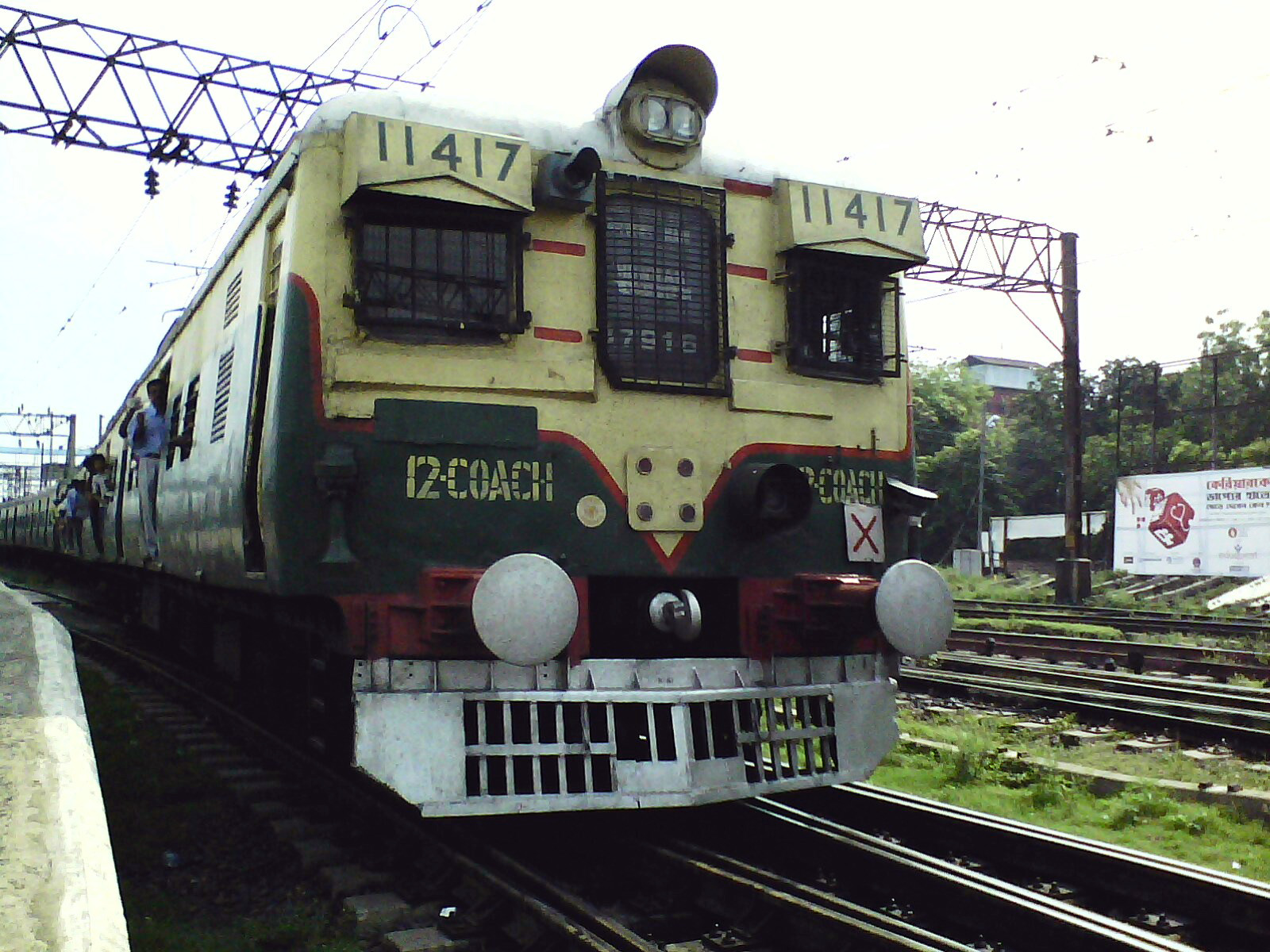
A Howrah-bound EMU train leaving Bandel Jn.

=== Other routes ===
The Sheoraphuli–Tarakeswar branch line was constructed in 1885, and the Howrah–Barddhaman chord line, a shorter link to Barddhaman, was constructed in 1917. (See route diagram for Sheoraphuli-Tarakeswar Line with this page also).

With the construction of the Jubilee Bridge in 1887 across the Hooghly, railway lines on the eastern side of the Hooghly were linked to the main line at Bandel. In 1932, the Calcutta chord line was built over the Willingdon Bridge joining Dum Dum with Dankuni.

In 1913, the Hooghly–Katwa Railway constructed a line from Bandel to Katwa, and the Barharwa–Azimganj–Katwa Railway constructed the Barharwa–Azimganj–Katwa loop.(See route diagram for the Bandel–Katwa line with this page).

The railway track was extended to Belur Math in 2003.

In 2021, Prime Minister Narendra Modi inaugurated the third line between Rasulpur and Magra of this route to reduce the congestion of the trains in this route.

== Electrification ==
The line was electrified in 1957 using 3000 V DC traction. It was later converted to 25 kV AC traction in 1968.

== Tracks ==
There are 5 tracks between Howrah and Bally, 3 tracks between Bally and Serampore, 4 tracks between Serampore and Seoraphuli Junction, 3 tracks between Seoraphuli Junction and Bandel Junction and 3 tracks between Bandel Junction and Saktigarh and from Saktigarh up to Barddhaman Junction 4 tracks. This line uses automatic block signalling

== Loco and car sheds ==
Howrah has a diesel and an electric loco shed. Both of them rank among the largest in India. The diesel loco shed houses WDM-2, WDM-3(A, B and D), WDP-4D and WDS-6 locos. Some WDS-4 are also occasionally seen shunting alongside the regular WDS-6 ones. The electric loco shed houses WAP-4 and WAP-7 locos. Commissioned in 2001, it is one of the largest WAP-4 sheds in Indian Railways. There used to be a time when, 60% of the shed was occupied by WAP-4 alone. It is also growing in stature as it can also now handle large no. of locos of one of the premier passenger WORKHORSE locos of India...i.e.WAP-7.it currently holds ownership of more than 30+ WAP-7 locos. It has facilities for handling 100+ locos. Some of these, like WAM-4 and WAG-5 are borrowed in temporarily from the Asansol electric loco shed, The main hub for handling WAM and WAG types (except WAG-9., whose ownership resides with Howrah shed ). The Howrah electric loco shed has a very detailed planning of the infrastructure that allows it to hold and maintain its own locos as well as locos from other sheds. There is a diesel loco shed at Bamangachi with WDM-2(not more than 7 generally ), WDS-4 and WDS-6(some of them being diesel hydraulic shunters). Barddhaman has a diesel loco shed with WDG-3(A and B), WDM-6(generally a couple of them), WDM-2 and WDM-3(A, B, D) locos. It can handle 35+ locos. There is a diesel loco shed at Liluah and an Electrical multiple unit (EMU) car shed at Howrah and Bandel. Liluah Carriage & Wagon Workshop maintains coaches and freight wagons.

Tikiapara Coaching Depot maintains 22 primary base trains and 6 round trip trains. Total coach holding capacity is 744 coaches. It handles prestigious trains like Rajdhani Express and Duronto Express. The Coaching Depot is under Howrah Division, Eastern Railway. Barddhaman Coaching & Wagon Depot can maintain four passenger trains, including one DEMU rake. It has a capacity of holding 71 coaches.

== Speed limits ==
The Howrah–Barddhaman main line is classified as 'B' class line where trains can run at up to 110 km per hour .
