= Hooghly district =

District in West Bengal, India

- District of West Bengal
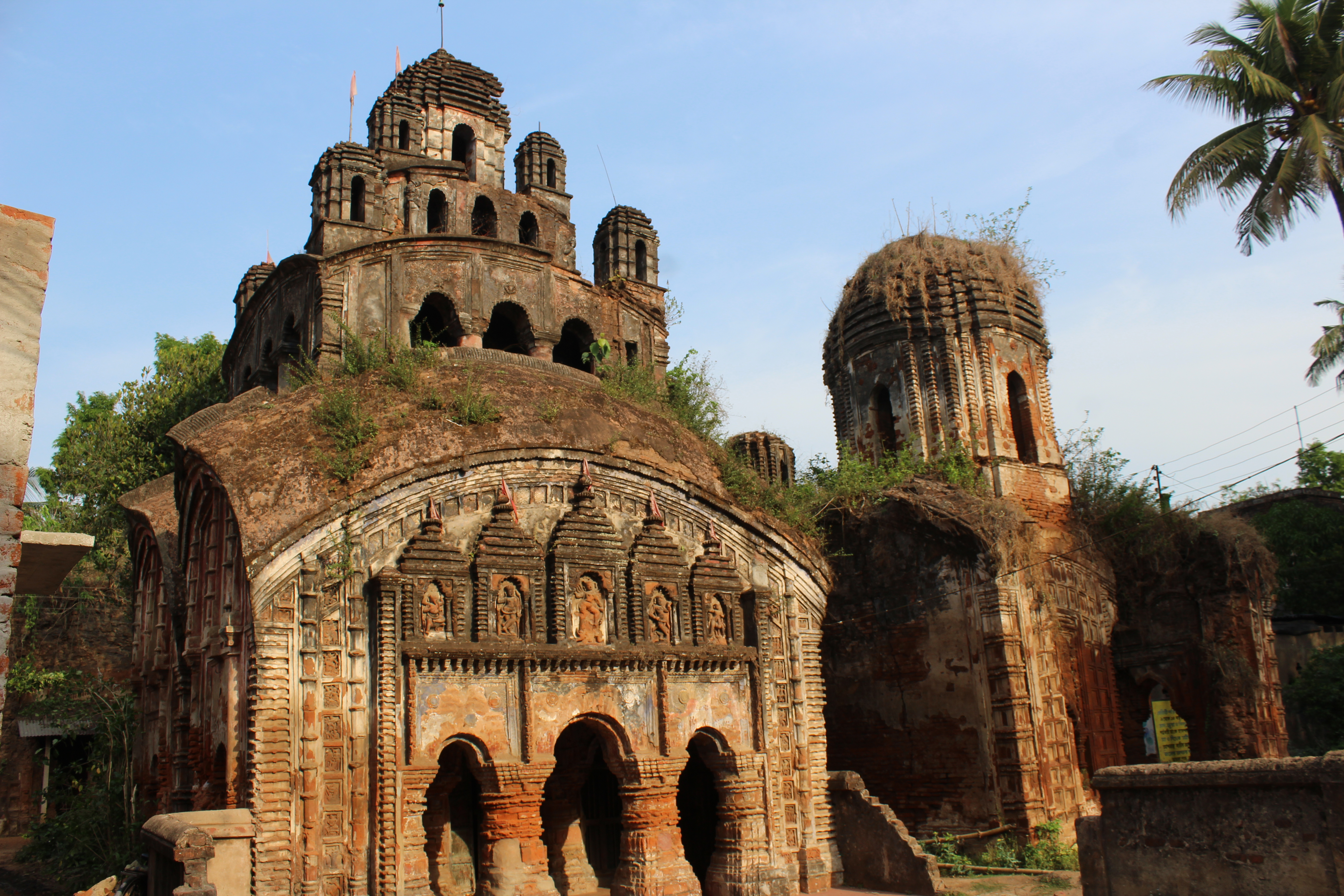
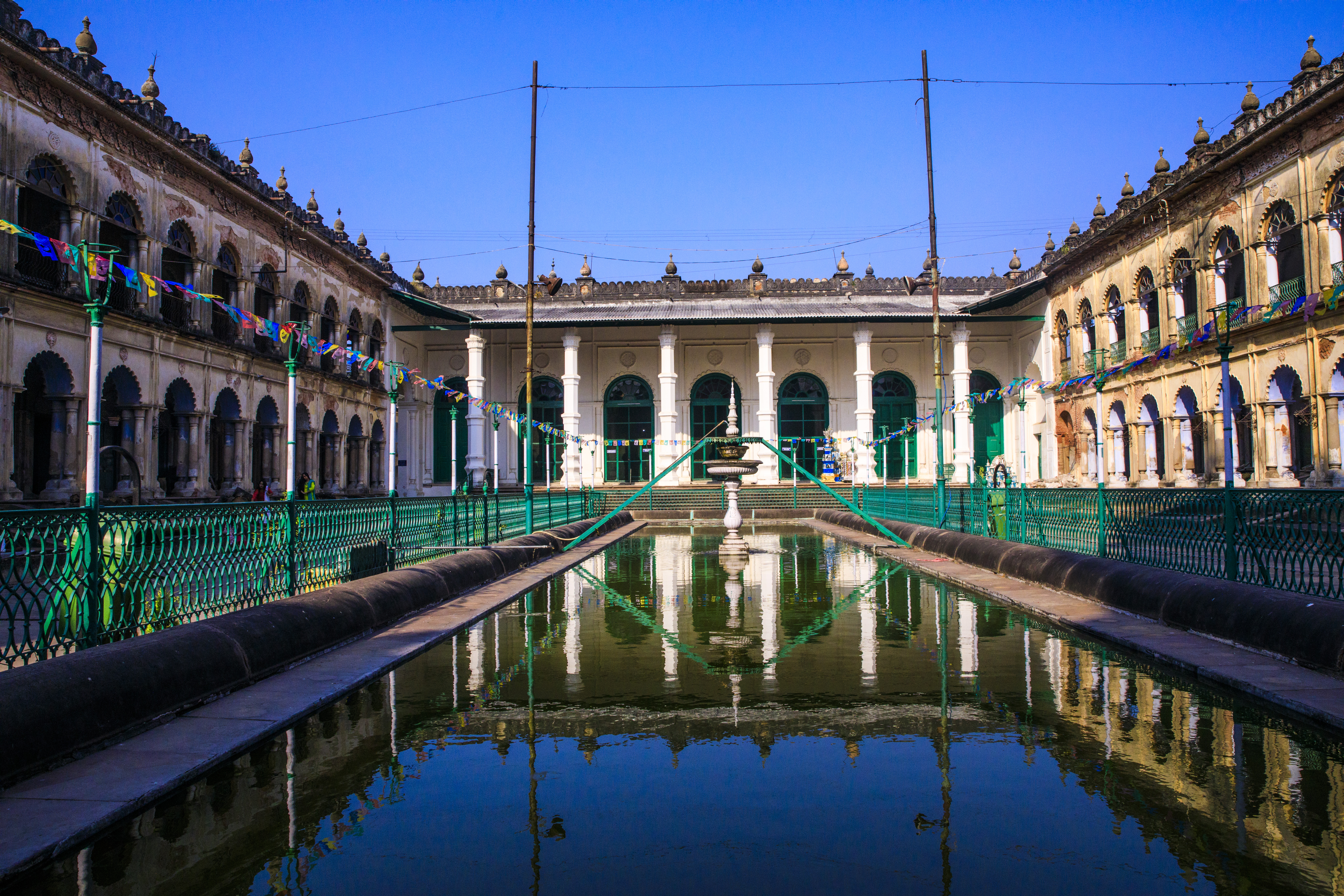
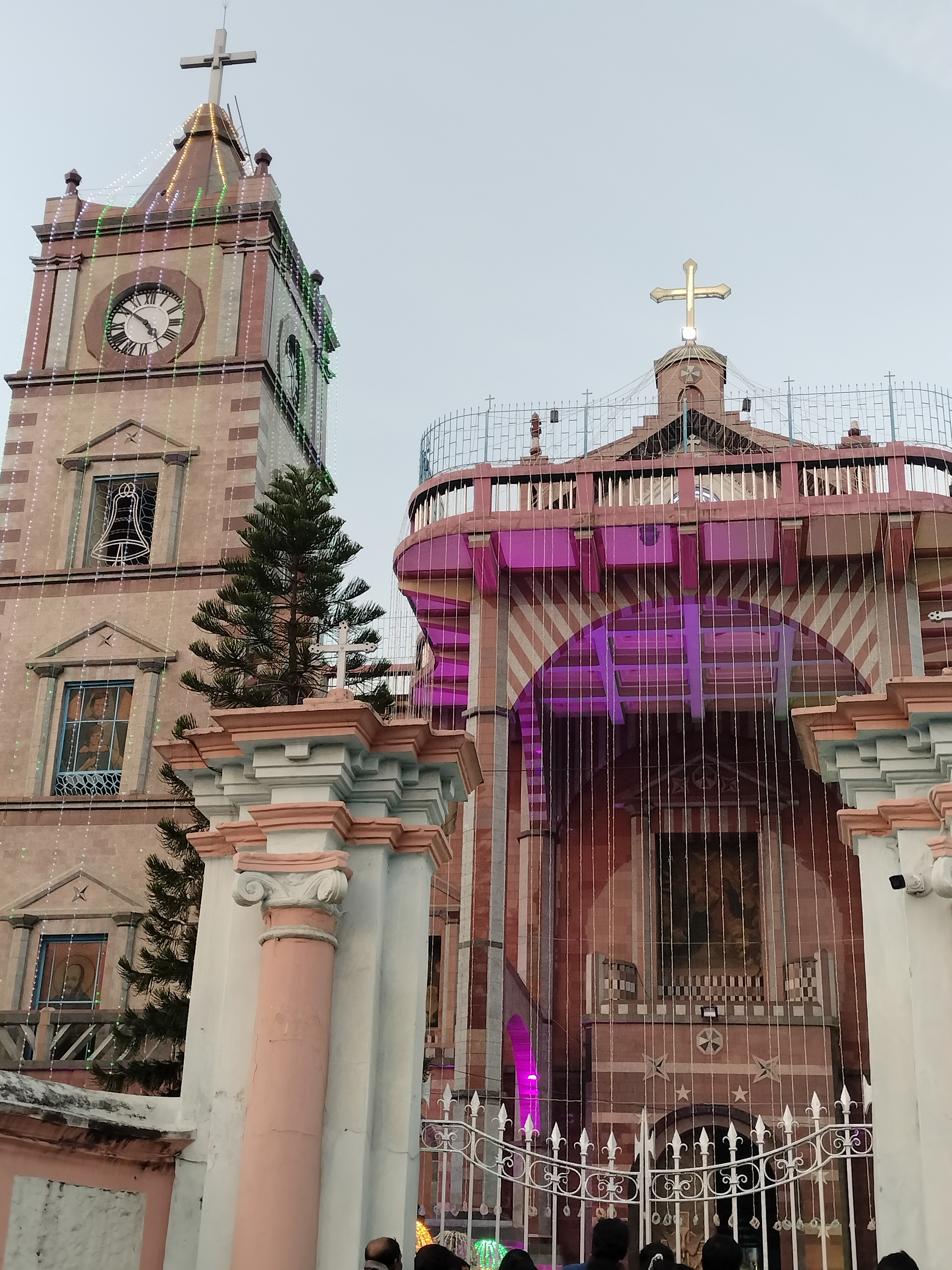
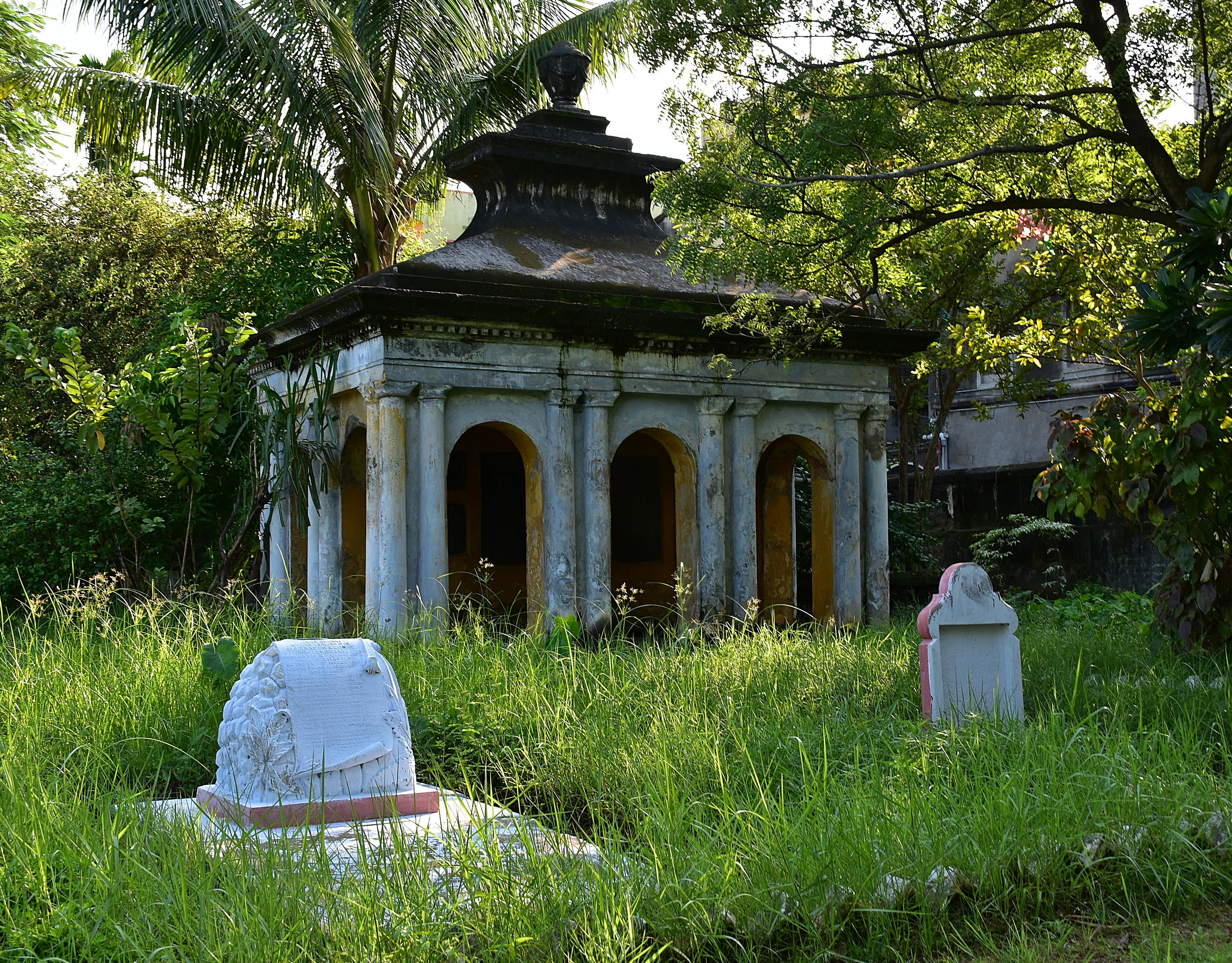
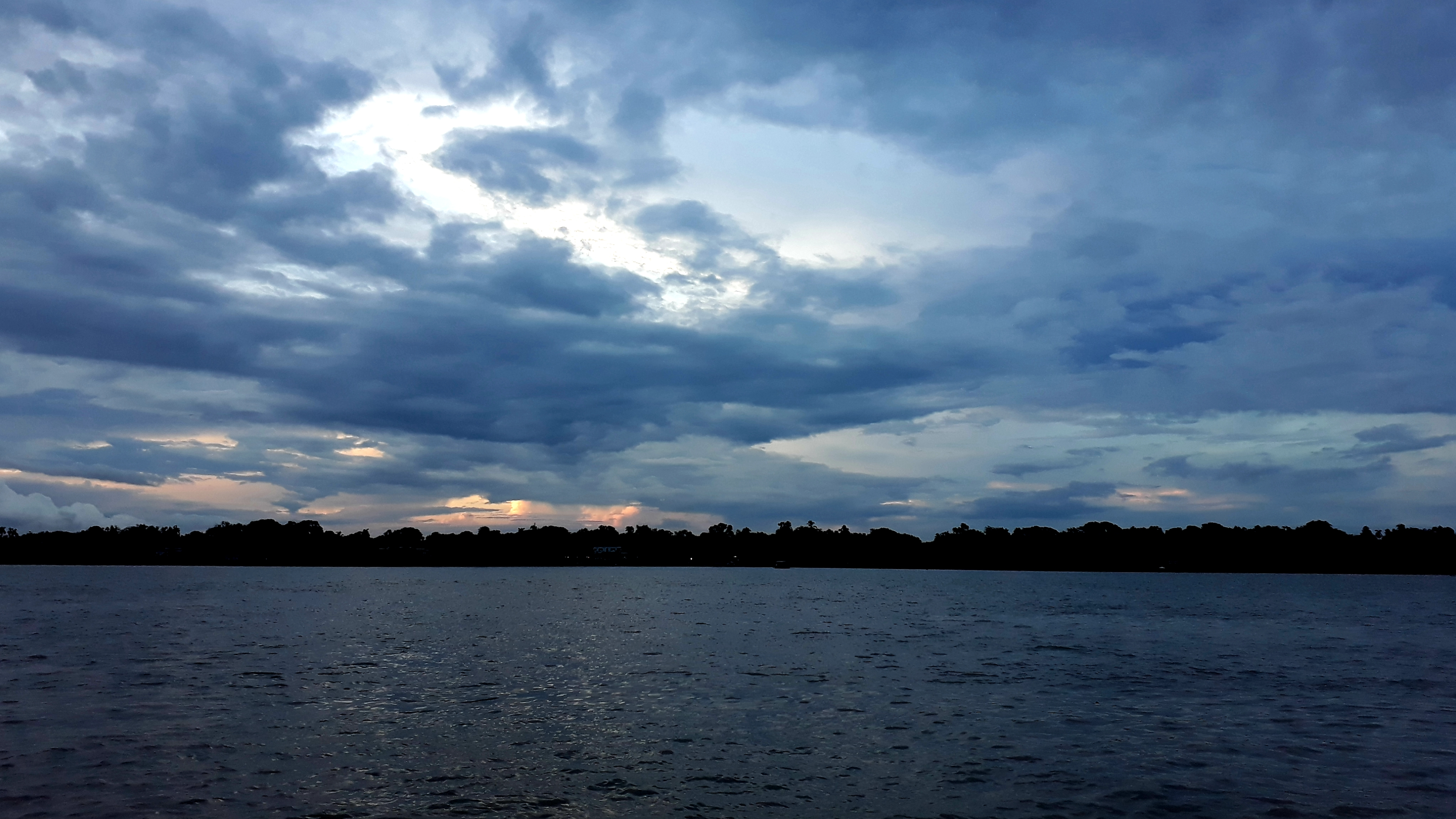
- Clockwise from top-left: Durga temple of Bali Dewanganj, Hooghly Imambara, Danish cemetery at Serampore, Hooghly River, Bandel Church at Bandel
- Interactive map of Hooghly district
- Coordinates: 22.90°N 88.39°E
- Country: India
- State: West Bengal
- Division: Burdwan
- Headquarters: Chuchura

Government
  - Subdivisions: Chinsurah Sadar, Chandannagar, Serampore, Arambag
  - CD Blocks: Balagarh, Chinsurah Mogra, Dhaniakhali, Pandua, Polba Dadpur, Haripal, Singur, Tarakeswar, Chanditala I, Chanditala II, Jangipara, Serampore Uttarpara, Khanakul I, Khanakul II, Goghat I, Goghat II, Pursurah
  - Lok Sabha constituencies: Arambagh, Hooghly, Serampore
  - Vidhan Sabha constituencies: Uttarpara, Sreerampur, Champdani, Singur, Chandannagar, Chunchura, Balagarh, Pandua, Saptagram, Chanditala, Jangipara, Haripal, Dhanekhali, Tarakeswar, Pursurah, Arambag, Goghat, Khanakul

Area
  - Total: 3,149 km^{2} (1,216 sq mi)

Population (2011)
  - Total: 5,519,145
  - Density: 1,753/km^{2} (4,539/sq mi)

Demographics
  - Literacy: 82.55 per cent
  - Sex ratio: 961 ♂/♀

Languages
  - Official: Bengali
  - Additional official: English
- Time zone: UTC+05:30 (IST)
- Website: hooghly.nic.in

Hooghly district (Note: Bengali: হুগলি জেলা, romanized: Hugli jelā, pronounced [ˈɦuɡliˑ ˈdʒelaˑ]; /ˈhuːɡli/ HOOG-lee) is one of the 23 districts in the Indian state of West Bengal. The headquarters of the district is Hugli-Chuchura. The district is named after the Hooghly River and is located in the Burdwan division. There are four subdivisions of the district: Chinsurah Sadar, Serampore, Chandannagore, and Arambagh.

== History ==
The district of Hooghly derived its name from the town of Hooghly on the west bank of the Hooghly River about 40 km north of Kolkata. This town was a major river port for trade in India before colonization.

The district has thousands of years of rich heritage as part of the Bengali kingdom of Bhurshut. In 1536 Portuguese traders obtained a permit from Sultan Mahmud Shah to trade in this area. In those days the Hooghly River was the main route for transportation and Hooghly served as an excellent trading port.

Within a few decades, the town of Hooghly turned into a major commercial centre and the largest port in Bengal. In 1579–80, Mughal Emperor Akbar gave permission to a Portuguese captain Pedro Tavares to establish a city anywhere in the Bengal province. They chose Hooghly, and it became the first European settlement in Bengal. In 1599, the Portuguese traders built a convent and a church in Bandel. This was the first Christian church in Bengal and is known as ‘Bandel Church’ today.

The Portuguese traders started slave trading, robbery and converting natives into Christians by pressure. At one point they stopped paying taxes to the Mughal Empire. As a result, Emperor Shah Jahan ordered the then-ruler of Bengal province, Qasim Khan Juvayni, to blockade the city of Hooghly. This led to a war in 1632 in which the Portuguese were defeated.

Among other European powers that came to Hooghly were the Dutch, the Danish, the British, the French, the Belgians and the Germans. Dutch traders centred their activities in the town Chuchura which is south of Hooghly. Chandannagar became the base of the French and the city remained under their control from 1816 to 1950. Similarly, the Danish establishment in settlement in Serampore (1755). All these towns are on the west bank of the Hooghly River and served as ports. Among these European countries, the British ultimately became most powerful.

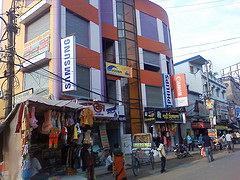
Chinsurah N.S Road

Initially the British were based in and around the city of Hooghly like traders from other countries. In 1690 Job Charnock decided to shift the British trading centre from Hooghly-Chinsura to Calcutta. The reason behind this decision was the strategically safe location of Calcutta and its proximity to the Bay of Bengal. As a result, trade and commerce in the Bengal province shifted from the town of Hooghly to Calcutta. Hooghly lost its importance as Calcutta prospered.

After the Battle of Buxar this region was brought under direct British rule until India's independence in 1947. After independence, this district merged into the state of West Bengal.

Though the city of Hooghly is more than 500 years old, the district of Hooghly was formed in 1795 with the city of Hooghly as its headquarters. Later the headquarters shifted to the town of Chuchura. In 1843 the Howrah district was created from the southern portion of this district. And in 1872, the south-west portion of this district was merged into the Medinipur district. The last change in area occurred in 1966.

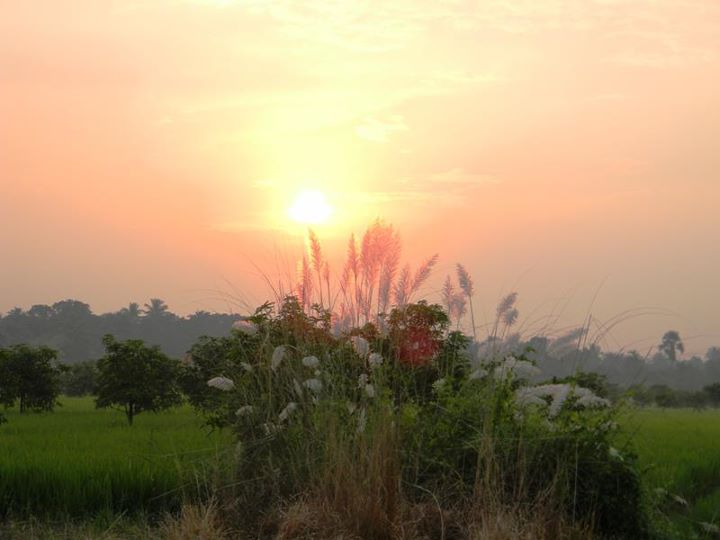
A village in Hooghly

== Tarakeswar Temple ==
The Taraknath Temple, dedicated to the Hindu god Shiva worshiped as Taraknath, is a major pilgrimage spot in the town of Tarakeswar. Built in 1729, the temple is an ‘atchala’ structure of Bengal temple architecture with a ‘natmandir’ in front. Close by are the shrines of Kali and Lakshmi Narayan. Dudhpukur, a tank to the north of the Shiva temple is believed to fulfil the prayers of those taking a dip in it.

Pilgrims visit the temple throughout the year, especially on Mondays. Thousands of pilgrims visit Tarakeswar on the occasions of Shivaratri and ‘Gajan’, the former taking place in Phalgun (Feb-March) while the latter lasts for five days ending on the last day of Chaitra (mid-April). The month of Sravana (mid-July to mid-August) is seen to be auspicious for Shiva when celebrations are held on each Monday.

== Geography ==
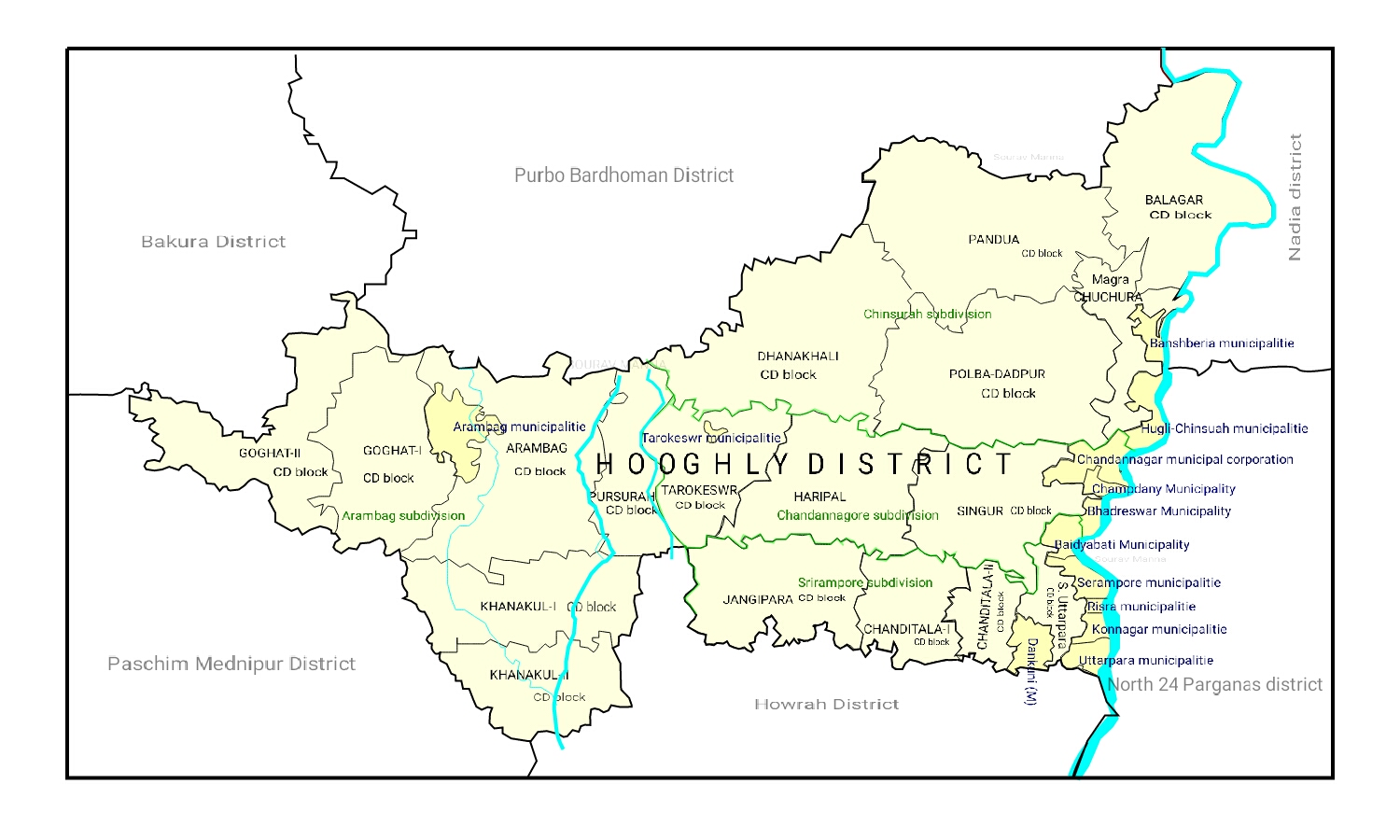
Map of Hooghly District showing CD blocks and municipal areas

The district is flat, with no place having an elevation of more than 200 meters. The River Hooghly borders it to the east. Another major river is the Damodar. The district is bordered by Howrah district to the south, Purba Bardhaman District to the north, and to the east by the River Hooghly. Bankura District lies to the north-west, with Paschim Medinipur District to the south-west.

== Economy ==
Hooghly is one of the most economically developed districts in West Bengal. It is the main jute cultivation, jute industry, and jute trade hub in the state. The jute mills are along the banks of the river Hooghly in Tribeni, Bhadreswar, Champdani and Sreerampur.

There are a number of industrial complexes including one of the largest car manufacturing plants in India, the Hindustan Motors plant in Uttarpara.

It was also home to the Singur Tata Nano controversy. Hindustan Motors plant was closed in 2014. Bandel Thermal power plant and Tribeni tissue plant (ITC) are running smoothly.

== Divisions ==
=== Administrative subdivisions ===
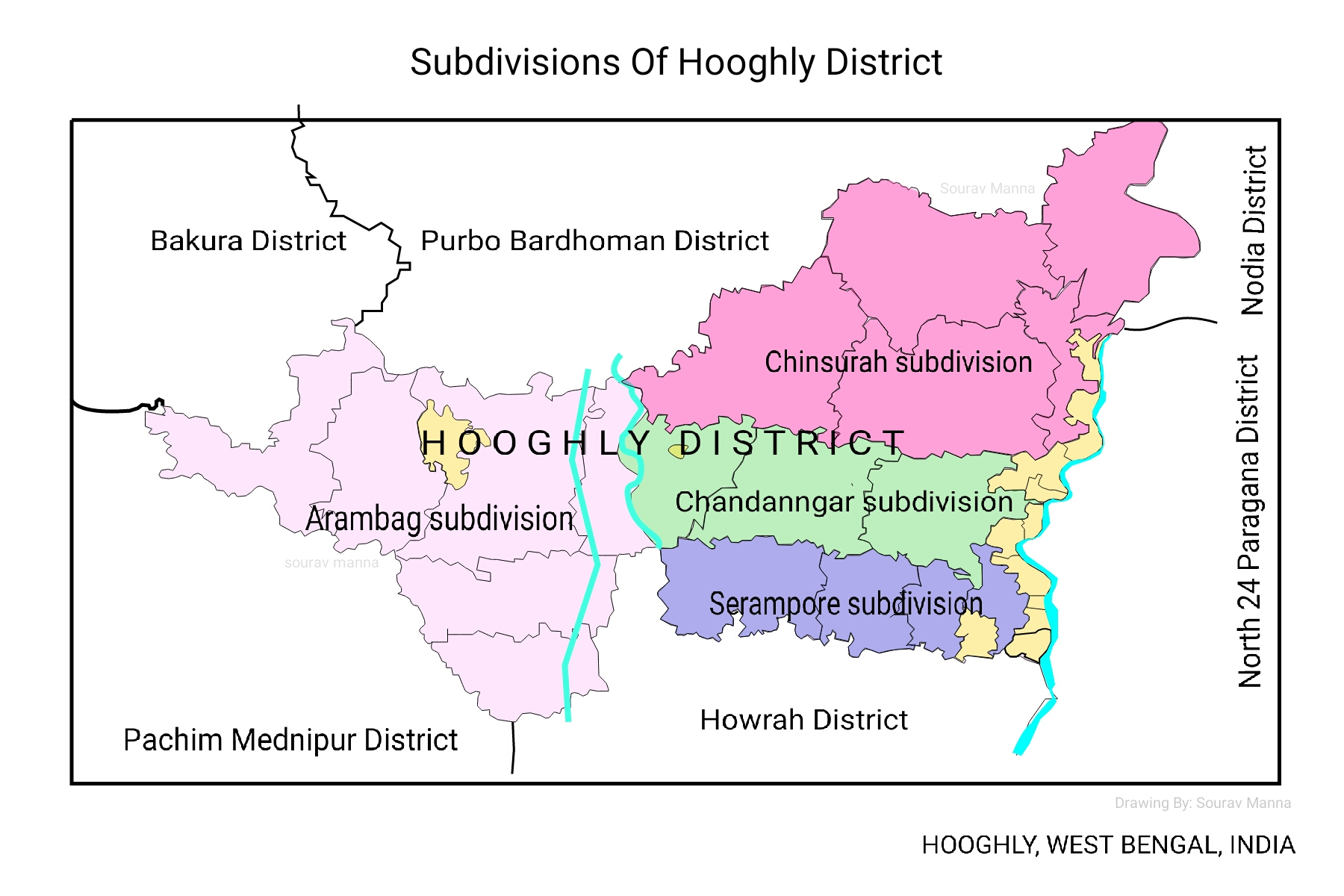
Subdivision of Hooghly district map

The district comprises four subdivisions: Chinsurah, Chandannagore, Srirampore and Arambagh.

- Chinsurah subdivision consists of two municipalities (Hugli-Chuchura and Bansberia) and five community development blocs: Balagarh, Chinsurah–Mogra, Dhaniakhali, Pandua and Polba–Dadpur.
- Chandannagore subdivision consists of Chandannagar municipal corporation and three municipalities (Bhadreswar, Champdani and Tarakeswar) and three community development blocs: Haripal, Singur and Tarakeswar.
- Srirampore subdivision consists of six municipalities (Serampore, Uttarpara Kotrung, Dankuni, Konnagar, Rishra and Baidyabati) and four community development blocks: Chanditala–I, Chanditala–II, Jangipara and Sreerampur Uttarpara.
- Arambagh subdivision consists of Arambag municipality and six community development blocks: Arambag, Khanakul–I, Khanakul–II, Goghat–I, Goghat–II and Pursurah.

Hugli-Chuchura is the district headquarters. There are 23 police stations, 18 development blocks, 12 municipalities and 207 gram panchayats in this district.

Other than municipality area, each subdivision contains community development blocks that are divided into rural areas and census towns. There are 41 urban units: 12 municipalities and 64 census towns.

==== Chinsurah subdivision ====
- Two municipalities: Hugli-Chinsurah and Bansberia
- Balagarh community development block consists of rural areas with 13 gram panchayats and four census towns: Jirat, Sripur, Badhagachhi, Mirdhanga.
- Chinsurah Mogra community development block consists of rural areas with 10 gram panchayats and eight census towns: Kodalia, Raghunathpur, Madhusudanpur, Amodghata, Shankhanagar, Chak Bansberia, Kulihanda, Simla.
- Dhaniakhali community development block consists of rural areas only with 18 gram panchayats.
- Pandua community development block consists of rural areas with 15 gram panchayats and three census towns: Boinchi, Pandua and Batika.
- Polba Dadpur community development block consists of rural areas only with 12 gram panchayats.

==== Chandannagore subdivision ====
- Chandannagar municipal corporation
- Three municipalities: Bhadreswar, Champdani, and Tarakeswar
- Haripal community development block consists of rural areas only with 15 gram panchayats one census town: Bargachhia.
- Singur community development block consists of rural areas with 16 gram panchayats and one census town: Singur.
- Tarakeswar community development block consists of rural areas only with 10 gram panchayats.

==== Srirampore subdivision ====
- Six municipalities: Serampore, Uttarpara Kotrung, Konnagar, Rishra, Dankuni and Baidyabati
- Chanditala I community development block consists of rural areas only with 9 gram panchayats and 2 census towns: Masat, Gangadharpur, Aniya, Bhagabatipur, Haripur, Krishnarampur, Kumirmorah, Nawabpur, Sheakhala.
- Chanditala II community development block consists of rural areas with 11 gram panchayats and 10 census towns: Purba Tajpur, Kharsarai, Begampur, Chikrand, Pairagachha, Monoharpur, Barijhati, Garalgachha, Krishnapur and Mrigala.
- Jangipara community development block consists of rural areas only with 10 gram panchayats.
- Sreerampur Uttarpara community development block consists of rural areas with six gram panchayats and six census towns: Raghunathpur, Dakshin Rajyadharpur, Bamunari, Rishra, Nabagram and Kanaipur.

==== Arambagh subdivision ====
- One municipality: Arambag.
- Arambag community development block consists of rural areas only with 15 gram panchayats.
- Khanakul I community development block consists of rural areas only with 13 gram panchayats.
- Khanakul II community development block consists of rural areas only with 11 gram panchayats.
- Goghat I community development block consists of rural areas only with 8 gram panchayats.
- Goghat II community development block consists of rural areas only with 9 gram panchayats.
- Pursurah community development block consists of rural areas only with 8 gram panchayats.

=== Blocks map ===
Arambag CD block map showing GP and urban areas

Balagarh CD block showing GP areas

Chanditala-I CD block map showing GP areas

Chanditala-II CD block map showing GP and urban areas

Chinsurah-Mogra CD block map showing GP and urban areas

Dhaniakhali CD block showing GP areas

Goghat-I CD block map showing GP areas

Goghat-II CD block showing GP areas

Haripal CD block map showing GP areas

Jangipara CD block map showing GP areas

Khanakul-I CD block map showings GP areas

Khanakul-II CD block Map showing GP areas

Pursurah CD block map showing GP areas

Pandua CD block map showing GP areas

Polba-Dadpur CD block map showing GP areas

Singur CD block map showing GP and urban areas

Sreerampur-Uttarpara CD block map showing GP and urban areas

Tarakeswar CD block map showing GP and urban areas

=== Assembly constituencies ===
The district is divided into 18 assembly constituencies:

No.	Name	Lok Sabha	MLA	2026 Winner	2024 Lead
185	Uttarpara	Sreerampur	Dipanjan Chakraborty	Bharatiya Janata Party	Trinamool Congress
186	Sreerampur	Sreerampur	Bhaskar Bhattacharya	Bharatiya Janata Party	Trinamool Congress
187	Champdani	Sreerampur	Dilip Singh	Bharatiya Janata Party	Trinamool Congress
188	Singur	Hooghly	Arup Kumar Das	Bharatiya Janata Party	Trinamool Congress
189	Chandannagar	Hooghly	Deepanjan Kumar Guha	Bharatiya Janata Party	Trinamool Congress
190	Chunchura	Hooghly	Subir Nag	Bharatiya Janata Party	Bharatiya Janata Party
191	Balagarh (SC)	Hooghly	Sumana Sarkar	Bharatiya Janata Party	Bharatiya Janata Party
192	Pandua	Hooghly	Tushar Kumar Majumdar	Bharatiya Janata Party	Trinamool Congress
193	Saptagram	Hooghly	Swaraj Ghosh	Bharatiya Janata Party	Bharatiya Janata Party
194	Chanditala	Sreerampur	Swati Khandoker	Trinamool Congress	Trinamool Congress
195	Jangipara	Sreerampur	Prosenjit Bag	Bharatiya Janata Party	Trinamool Congress
196	Haripal	Arambagh	Madhumita Ghosh	Bharatiya Janata Party	Trinamool Congress
197	Dhanekhali (SC)	Hooghly	Ashima Patra	Trinamool Congress	Trinamool Congress
198	Tarakeswar	Arambagh	Santu Pan	Bharatiya Janata Party	Trinamool Congress
199	Pursurah	Arambagh	Biman Ghosh	Bharatiya Janata Party	Bharatiya Janata Party
200	Arambagh (SC)	Arambagh	Hemanta Bag	Bharatiya Janata Party	Trinamool Congress
201	Goghat (SC)	Arambagh	Prasanta Digar	Bharatiya Janata Party	Bharatiya Janata Party
202	Khanakul	Arambagh	Susanta Ghosh	Bharatiya Janata Party	Bharatiya Janata Party

12 constituencies Balagarh, Dhaniakhali, Khanakul and Goghat constituencies are reserved for Scheduled Castes (SC) candidates. Along with two assembly constituencies from Howrah district, Jangipara, Chanditala, Uttarpara, Sreerampur and Champdani constituencies form the Sreerampur Lok Sabha constituency. Chandannagar, Singur, Chunchura, Balagarh, Saptagram, Pandua and Dhanekhali constituencies form the Hooghly Lok Sabha constituency. Tarakeswar, Pursurah, Khanakul, Arambagh, Haripal and Goghat constituencies are part of the Arambagh Lok Sabha constituency, which contains two assembly segments in Paschim Medinipur district.

As per order of the Delimitation Commission in respect of the delimitation of constituencies in the West Bengal, the district will be divided into 18 assembly constituencies: Balagarh, Dhanekhali, Arambag and Goghat constituencies will be reserved for Scheduled Castes (SC) candidates. Along with two assembly constituencies from Howrah district, Uttarpara, Sreerampur, Champdani, Chanditala and Jangipara constituencies will form the Sreerampur (Lok Sabha constituency). Singur, Chandannagar, Chunchura, Balagarh, Pandua, Saptagram and Dhanekhali constituencies will form the Hooghly (Lok Sabha constituency). Haripal, Tarakeswar, Pursurah, Arambag, Goghat and Khankul constituencies will be part of the Arambag (Lok Sabha constituency), which will contain one assembly segment in Paschim Medinipur district.

=== Police administration ===
Hooghly District comes under Burdwan Police Range. Hooghly Rural Police District was created on 30 June 2017, curbing out of erstwhile Hooghly district. Presently it consists of sixteen police station with jurisdiction, one women police station and one Cyber Police Station. The head quarter of Hooghly Rural Police District was shifted to Kamarkundu under Singur PS from Chinsura. Chandannagar Police Commissionerate was formed after bifurcation of the Hooghly Police District, and has nine police stations under its jurisdiction established on 30 June 2017, is a police force with primary responsibilities in law enforcement and investigation within certain urban parts of Hooghly district. The Commissionerate is part of the West Bengal Police, and comes under the Department of Home & Hill Affairs, Government of West Bengal.

For the functioning of 23 police stations of the district, District Intelligence Branch, District Enforcement Branch and District Reserve Police Force SP, Hooghly is assisted by three additional superintendents:

- HQ: Having his office at Chinsurah, he looks after the Sadar Sub-Division and District Police Force, being assisted by Dy.S.P. (HQ) and Dy.S.P. (D&T).
- Industrial: He is in Serampore. He is the supervising officer for Serampore and Chandernagore Sub Divisions, assisted by SDPO: Serampore and SDPO: Chandernagore.
- Rural: He is in Arambagh and is the supervising officer for Arambagh Sub Division; being assisted by SDPO: Arambagh.

== Transport ==
=== Rail ===
The railway communication of the district, especially at the suburban area, are available throughout the district.

There are four junction stations in Hooghly:

- Bandel Junction railway station
- Dankuni Junction railway station
- Sheoraphuli railway station
- Kamarkundu

The railway is under Howrah Division. The Howrah – New Delhi Rajdhani Route passes through the district

=== Bus ===
There are several bus stands in Hooghly district. Grand Trunk Road passes through the district and Private and Govt. buses are available.

== Demographics ==
Historical population
Year	Pop.	±% p.a.
1901	1,076,416	—
1911	1,115,927	+0.36%
1921	1,105,907	−0.09%
1931	1,141,558	+0.32%
1941	1,415,934	+2.18%
1951	1,605,004	+1.26%
1961	2,231,288	+3.35%
1971	2,872,116	+2.56%
1981	3,557,306	+2.16%
1991	4,355,230	+2.04%
2001	5,041,976	+1.47%
2011	5,519,145	+0.91%

According to the 2011 census Hooghly district has a population of 5,519,145, roughly equal to the nation of Denmark or the US state of Wisconsin. This gives it a ranking of 16th in India (out of a total of 640). The district has a population density of 1,753 inhabitants per square kilometre (4,540/sq mi). Its population growth rate over the decade 2001–2011 was 9.49%. Hugli has a sex ratio of 958 females for every 1000 males, and a literacy rate of 82.55%. 38.57% of the population lives in urban areas. Scheduled Castes and Scheduled Tribes make up 24.35% and 4.15% of the population respectively.

=== Religion ===
Religion in Hooghly district (2011 census)
1. Hinduism (82.9%)
2. Islam (15.8%)
3. No religion (0.21%)
4. Christianity (0.13%)
5. Sikhism (0.05%)
6. Jainism (0.04%)
7. Buddhism (0.03%)
8. Other religions (0.89%)

Religion in Hooghly district
Religion	Population (1941)	Percentage (1941)	Population (2011)	Percentage (2011)
Hinduism	799,688	74.2%	4,574,569	82.89%
Islam	207,077	19.2%	870,204	15.77%
Tribal religion (Note: All tribals were counted under 'Tribal' in the 1941 census irrespective of actual religion practiced.)	69,500	6.45%	49,050	0.89%
Others (Note: Including Jainism, Christianity, Buddhism, Zoroastrianism, Judaism, Ad-Dharmis, or not stated)	1,464	0.15%	25,322	0.45%
Total Population	1,077,729	100%	5,519,145	100%

Hindus are the majority community in the district. Muslims are the largest minority, concentrated more in rural areas.

=== Language ===
Languages of Hooghly district (2011)
1. Bengali (87.5%)
2. Hindi (7.59%)
3. Santali (2.37%)
4. Urdu (1.72%)
5. Others (0.83%)

At the time of the 2011 census, 87.49% of the population spoke Bengali, 7.59% Hindi, 2.37% Santali and 1.72% Urdu as their first language. Hindi and Urdu speakers are predominantly found in urban areas.

== Education ==
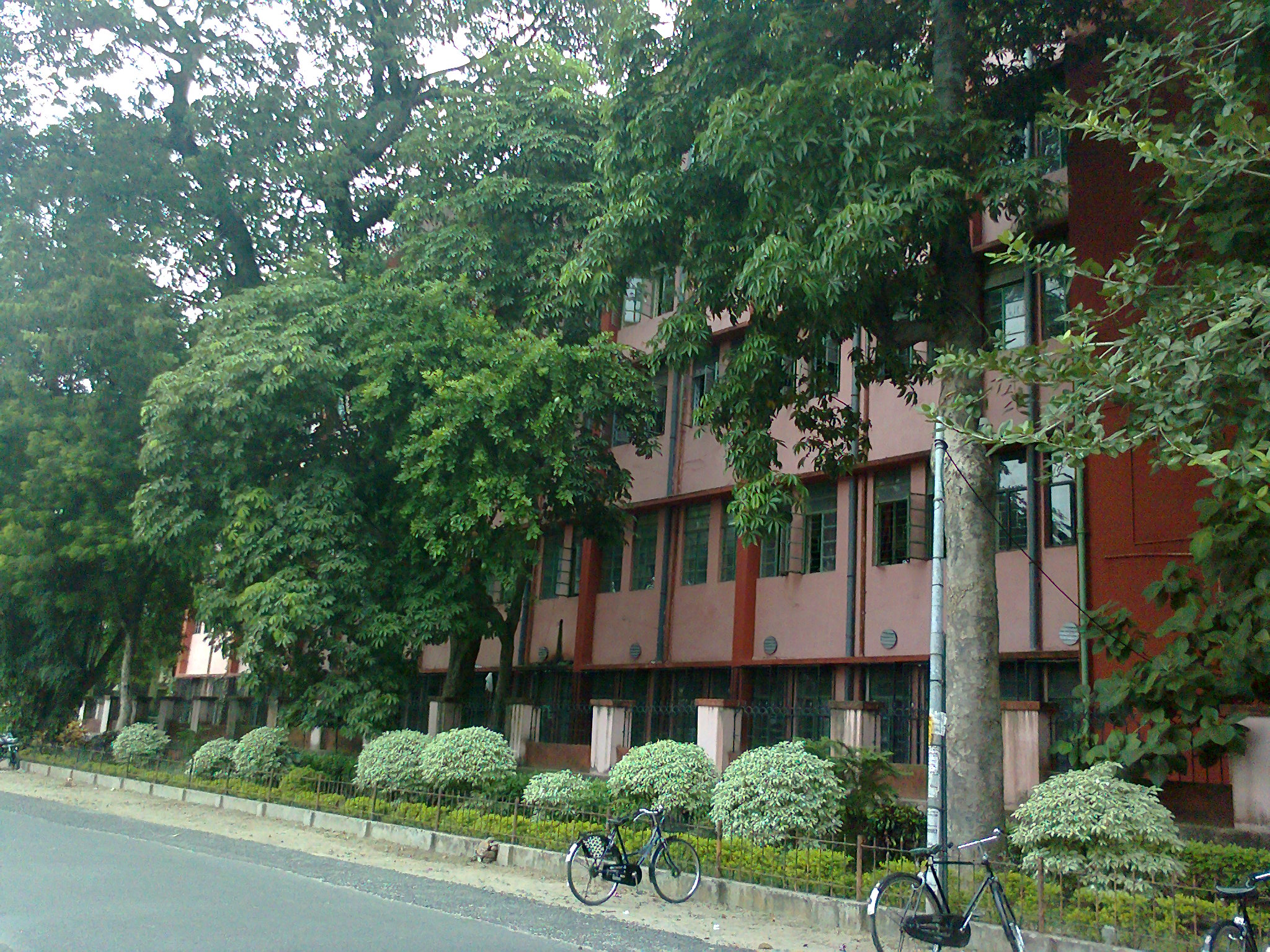
Chandernagore Govt. College

There are 2992 primary schools, 408 high schools, 127 higher secondary schools, 22 colleges, and 6 technical institutes in Hooghly district. Notable institutions include:

- Balagarh Bijoy Krishna Mahavidyalaya
- Chatra Nandalal Institution
- Furfura Fatehia Senior Madrasah established in 1902
- Government College of Engineering & Textile Technology, Serampore
- Hooghly Branch Government School
- Hooghly Collegiate School established in 1812
- Hooghly Madrasah established in 1817
- Hooghly Mohsin College established in 1836
- Mahesh High School
- Mahesh Sri Ramkrishna Ashram Vidyalaya (Higher Secondary)
- Rani Rashmoni Green University established in 2018
- Sarat Centenary College
- Saroj Mohan Institute of Technology
- Serampore College
- Serampore Girls' College
- Serampore Girl's High School
- Serampore Union Institution
- St Joseph's Convent, Chandannagar
- Vivekananda Mahavidyalaya, Haripal

== Historical places ==
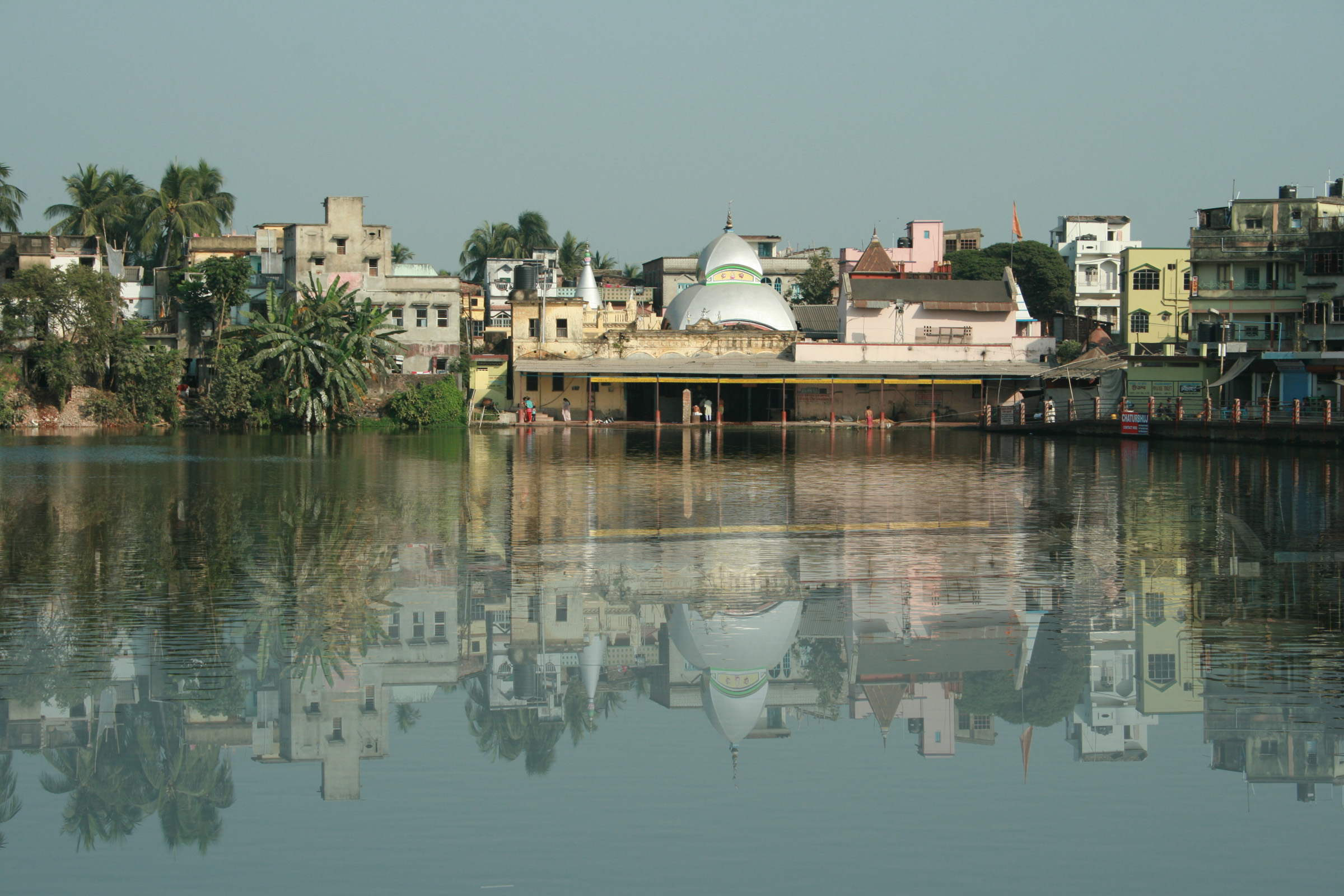
Taraknath Temple, Tarakeswar

- Tarakeswar, home of Taraknath Temple.
- Serampore, where the Senate of Serampore College (University) was established
- Bandel, home of Bandel Church, West Bengal's oldest church
- Furfura Sharif, Shrine of Pir Mohammad Abu Bakr Siddique
- Itachuna Rajbari, the historical mansion in Itachuna
- Serampore Rajbari, the heritage mansion at Chatra

== Notable people ==
This is a list of notable people from Hooghly District:

- Sridhara was an Indian mathematician, Sanskrit pandit and philosopher. Sridharacharya's formula is also known as the Quadratic formula or Sridharacharya's method.
- Panchanan Karmakar, inventor of wooden Bengali alphabet typeface
- Anil Chatterjee is an actor.
- Brajendra Nath Seal was a humanist philosopher.
- Diwan Mohanlal, born in Guptipara, was a Hindu King, and the Chief commander of Nawab Siraj au Daulla.
- Raja Ram Mohan Roy, born in Radhanagore. He is considered as the "Father of the Indian Renaissance". He was one of the founders of the Brahmo Sabha, the precursor of the Brahmo Samaj, a socio-religious (Hindu) reform movement in Undivided India.
- Nibaran Chandra Mukherjee was a Brahmo reformer.
- Haji Muhammad Mohsin was a famous philanthropist.
- Bhaduri Mahasaya, revered as Maharishi Nagendranath Bhaduri, once guided young minds as headmaster of Janai Training High School. Bhaduri Mahasaya was also known as "The Levitating Saint" due to accounts of his levitation during intense pranayama practices, as described by Paramahansa Yogananda in his Autobiography of a Yogi. His maternal uncle’s home in Chatra, Serampore was a cherished haven, where he often stayed and immersed himself in quiet contemplation.
- Satish Chandra Mukherjee, born in Banipur, was a pioneer in establishing a system of national education in India.
- Ramdas Adak, Bengali and Sanskrit poet, one of the composers of Dharmamangal
- Subroto Mukherjee was the first Indian Commander-in-Chief of the Indian Air Force.
- Ganga Prasad Mukherjee was a physician.
- Jagannath Tarka Panchanan was a legendary Sanskrit scholar and pundit of ancient Hindu Laws.
- Ramakrishna was a Hindu mystic, saint, and religious leader in 19th century Bengal.
- Nagendranath Basu was an archaeologist, encyclopaedist and a nationalist social historian of Bengal.
- Amiya Chakravarty was a literary critic, academic, and Bengali poet. He was a close associate of Rabindranath Tagore, and edited several books of his poetry.
- Ganapati Chakraborty was a magician known for his mesmerizing tricks and is considered to be the pioneer of modern magic in Bengal.
- Rangalal Bandyopadhyay was a Bengali poet, journalist and author.
- Kali Mirza was an 18th-century composer of tappā music in Bengal. A contemporary of Nidhu Babu, he composed over 400 tappās.
- Swami Sri Yukteswar Giri was an Indian monk and yogi, and the guru of Paramahansa Yogananda and Swami Satyananda Giri.
- Nagendranath Chattopadhyay was a noted Sanskrit scholar and grammarian.
- Murari Mohan Mukherjee was a plastic surgeon.
- Krishna Chandra Bhattacharya was a philosopher at the University of Calcutta known for his method of "constructive interpretation" through which relations and problematics of ancient Indian philosophical systems are drawn out and developed so that they can be studied like problems of modern philosophy.
- Sisir Kumar Mitra was a physicist.
- Madhusudan Gupta was a translator and Ayurvedic practitioner who was also trained in Western medicine and is credited with having performed India's first human dissection at Calcutta Medical College (CMC) in 1836, almost 3,000 years after Susruta.
- Prabhat Kumar Mukhopadhyay was a Bengali author.
- Sarat Chandra Chattopadhyay was a Bengali novelist and short story writer of the early 20th century.
- Akshay Chandra Sarkar was a poet, an editor and a literary critic of Bengali literature.
- Raja Digambar Mitra was one of the leading Derozians and first Bengali Sheriff of Kolkata.
- Kanailal Dutta was a revolutionary in India's freedom struggle belonging to the Jugantar group.
- Ashapurna Devi was a prominent Indian novelist and poet in Bengali language.
- Brahmabandhav Upadhyay was a theologian, journalist and Indian freedom fighter. He was closely attached with Keshub Chandra Sen, classmate of Swami Vivekananda and close acquaintance of Rabindranath Tagore.
- Ramnidhi Gupta was commonly known as Nidhu Babu . He was one of the great reformers of Bengali tappā music.
- Kirity Roy, a civil rights activist working in West Bengal
- Motilal Roy was a Bengali revolutionary, journalist, social reformer. He founded the "Prabartak Sangha", a nationalist organisation for social works.
- Dwarka Nath Mitra was a famous lawyer and judge of the Calcutta High Court.
- Nabagopal Mitra was an Indian playwright, poet, essayist, patriot and one of the founding fathers of Hindu nationalism. He founded the Hindu Mela, the pioneer institution behind the genesis of Hindu nationalism. Mitra also founded National Press, National Paper, National Society, National School, National Theatre, National Store, National Gymnasium and National Circus, earning him the sobriquet 'National Mitra'.
- Barindra Kumar Ghosh was an Indian revolutionary and journalist. He was one of the founding members of "Jugantar", a Bengali weekly, a revolutionary outfit in Bengal. Barindra Kumar Ghosh was the younger brother of Shri Aurobindo.
- Manmohan Ghose was an Indian poet and one of the first from India to write poetry in English. He was a brother of Sri Aurobindo.
- Ashim Kumar Majhi is a politician.
- Nirmal Jibon Ghosh, an Indian revolutionary and member of the Bengal volunteers.
- Premendra Mitra belonged to the renowned Mitra family of Konnagar.
- Surajit Dhara, recipient of the Shanti Swarup Bhatnagar Prize for Science and Technology for his contributions to physical sciences in 2020
- Chandranath Basu was an Indian litterateur who coined the term "Hindutva" and has been regarded as a doyen of economic and Indian nationalism in Bengal.
- Abbas Siddiqui, religious scholar.
- Kasem Bin Abu Bakar, Bengali novelist

== See also ==
- Rathayatra of Mahesh, Serampore
