= Bharat Ratna =

India's highest civilian award

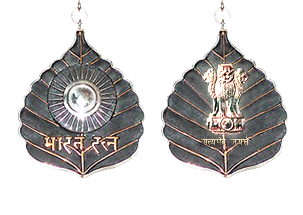
- Type: National Civilian
- Description: Highest Civilian Award of the Republic of India
- Country: India
- Presented by: President of India
- Ribbon
- Obverse: An image of the Sun along with the words "Bharat Ratna", inscribed in Devanagari script, on a sacred fig (Ficus religiosa) leaf
- Reverse: A platinum State Emblem of India placed in the centre with the national motto, "Satyameva Jayate" (Truth alone triumphs) in Devanagari script
- Established: 1954; 72 years ago
- First award: 1955: C. Rajagopalachari; Sarvepalli Radhakrishnan; C. V. Raman
- Latest award: 2024: Karpoori Thakur (posthumous); Lal Krishna Advani; Charan Singh (posthumous); P. V. Narasimha Rao (posthumous); M. S. Swaminathan (posthumous)

Highlights
- Total: 53
- Website: www.padmaawards.gov.in

Precedence
- Next (higher): None
- Next (lower): Param Vir Chakra (military); Padma Vibhushan (civilian)

The Bharat Ratna (Sanskrit pronunciation: [bʱaːɾət̪ ɾət̪n̪ə]; lit. 'Jewel of India') is the highest civilian award of the Republic of India. Instituted on 2 January 1954, the award is conferred in recognition of "exceptional service/performance of the highest order", without distinction of race, occupation, position or gender. The award was originally limited to achievements in the arts, literature, science, and public services, but the Government of India expanded the criteria to include "any field of human endeavour" in December 2011. The recipients receive a Sanad (certificate) signed by the president and a sacred fig leaf-shaped medallion. Bharat Ratna recipients rank seventh in the Indian order of precedence.

The first recipients of the Bharat Ratna were: the former governor-general of the Union of India C. Rajagopalachari, the former president of the Republic of India Sarvepalli Radhakrishnan; and the Indian physicist C. V. Raman, who were honoured in 1954. Since then, the award has been bestowed upon 53 individuals, including 18 who were awarded posthumously. The original statutes did not provide for posthumous awards but were amended in January 1966 to permit them to honour former prime minister Lal Bahadur Shastri, the first individual to be honoured posthumously. In 2014, cricketer Sachin Tendulkar, then aged 40, became the youngest recipient, while social reformer Dhondo Keshav Karve was the oldest recipient when he was awarded on his 100th birthday. Though usually conferred on India-born citizens, the award has been conferred on one naturalized citizen, Mother Teresa, and on two non-Indians: Abdul Ghaffar Khan (born in British India and later a citizen of Pakistan) and Nelson Mandela, a citizen of South Africa.

The Bharat Ratna, along with other personal civil honours, was briefly suspended from July 1977 to January 1980, during the change in the national government; and for a second time from August 1992 to December 1995, when several public-interest litigations challenged the constitutional validity of the awards. In 1992, the government's decision to confer the award posthumously on Subhas Chandra Bose was opposed by those who had refused to accept the fact of his death, including some members of his extended family. Following a 1997 Supreme Court decision, the press communique announcing Bose's award was cancelled; it is the only time when the award was announced but not conferred.

== History ==
On 2 January 1954, a press communique was released from the office of the secretary to the president announcing the creation of two civilian awards—Bharat Ratna (Jewel of India), the highest civilian award, and the three-tier Padma Vibhushan, classified into "Pehla Warg" (Class I), "Dusra Warg" (Class II), and "Tisra Warg" (Class III), which rank below the Bharat Ratna. On 15 January 1955, the Padma Vibhushan was reclassified into three different awards; the Padma Vibhushan, the highest of the three, followed by the Padma Bhushan and the Padma Shri.

The award was briefly suspended twice in its history. The first suspension occurred when Morarji Desai, who was sworn in as the fourth prime minister in 1977, withdrew all personal civil honours on 13 July 1977. The suspension was rescinded on 25 January 1980, after Indira Gandhi became the prime minister. The award was suspended again in mid-1992, when two Public-Interest Litigations were filed, one in the Kerala High Court and another in the Madhya Pradesh High Court, challenging the "constitutional validity" of the awards. The awards were reintroduced by the Supreme Court in December 1995, following the conclusion of the litigation.

There is no formal provision that recipients of the Bharat Ratna should be Indian citizens. It has been awarded to a naturalised Indian citizen, Mother Teresa in 1980, and to two non-Indians, Abdul Ghaffar Khan of Pakistan in 1987 and the former South African president Nelson Mandela in 1990. Sachin Tendulkar, at the age of 40, became the youngest person and first sportsperson to receive the honour. Dhondo Keshav Karve was the oldest living recipient when he was awarded on his 100th birthday on 18 April 1958. (Note: The Bharat Ratna ceremony is usually held at Rashtrapati Bhavan, New Delhi but a special ceremony was held at Brabourne Stadium, Mumbai to honour Karve on his 100th birthday, 18 April 1958.) As of February 2026, the award has been conferred upon 53 people with 18 posthumous declarations.

== Regulations ==
The Bharat Ratna is conferred "in recognition of exceptional service/performance of the highest order", without distinction of race, occupation, position, or gender. The award was originally confined to the arts, literature, science, and public services, as per the 1954 regulations. In December 2011, the rules were amended to "any field of human endeavour". The 1954 statutes did not allow posthumous awards, but this was subsequently modified in the January 1966 statute, and Lal Bahadur Shastri became the first recipient to be honoured posthumously in 1966.

Although there is no formal nomination process, recommendations for the award can only be made by the prime minister to the president. The recipient receives a Sanad (certificate) signed by the president and a medallion without any monetary grant. Usage of the title 'Bharat Ratna' as a prefix by the awardee is exempt from Article 18 (1) of the Constitution, (Note: Per Article 18 (1) of the Constitution of India: Abolition of titles, "no title, not being a military or academic distinction, shall be conferred by the State".) as per the Supreme Court's precedent in Balaji Raghavan/S.P. Anand v. Union of India in 1995. Additionally, recipients may either use the expression "Awarded Bharat Ratna by the President" or "Recipient of Bharat Ratna Award" to indicate that they have been honoured with the award. The holders of the Bharat Ratna rank seventh in the Indian order of precedence.

As with many official announcements, recipients are announced and registered in The Gazette of India, a publication released by the Department of Publication, Ministry of Urban Development used for official government notices; without publication in the Gazette, conferral of the award is not considered official. Recipients whose awards have been revoked or restored, both of which require the authority of the president, are registered in the Gazette. Recipients whose awards have been revoked are required to surrender their medals, and their names are struck from the register.

== Specifications ==
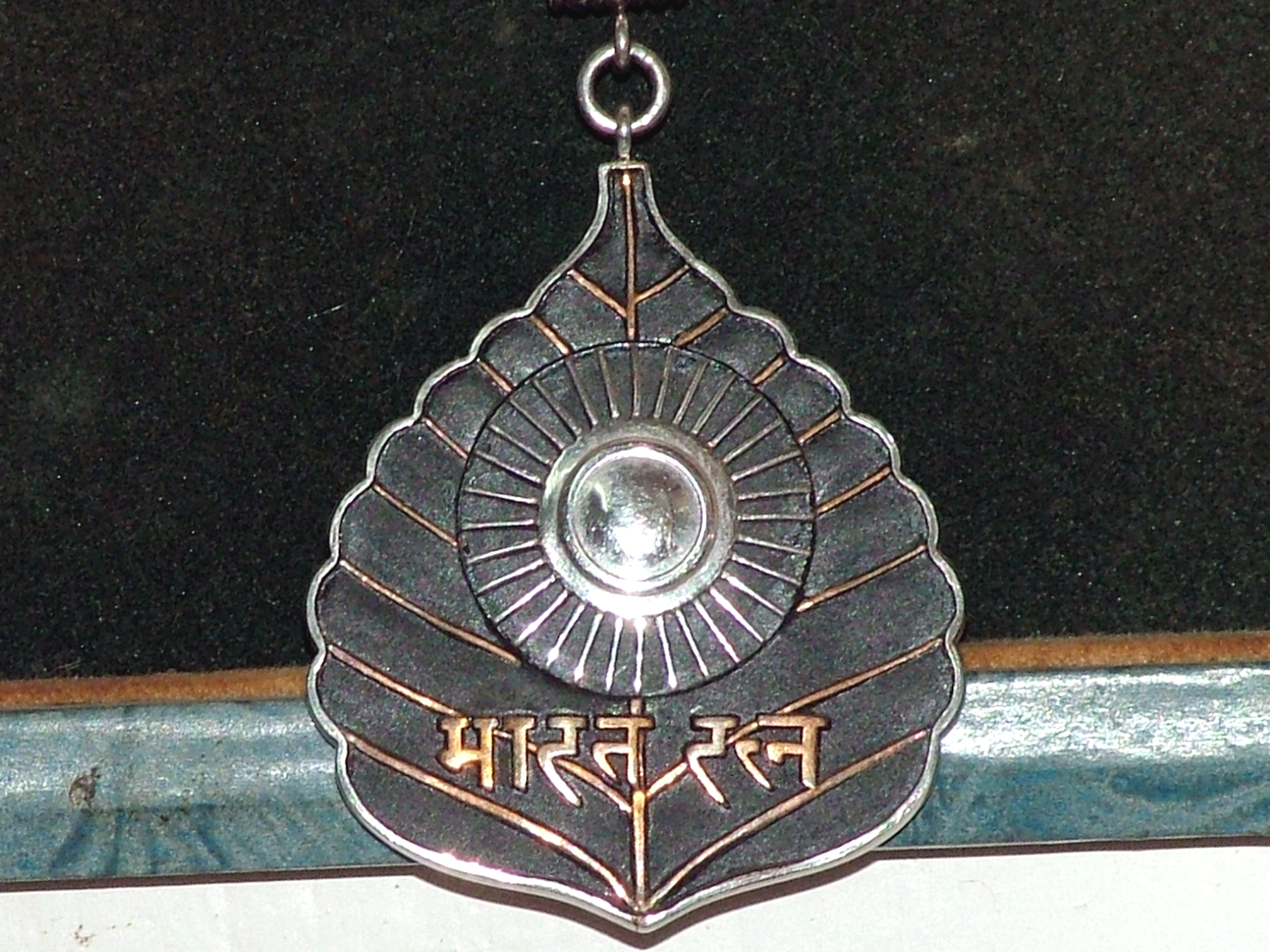
Bharat Ratna medal

The original 1954 specifications of the award was a circle made of gold 1 3/8 inches (35 mm) in diameter with a centered image of the sun on the obverse side. The text "Bharat Ratna", in Devanagari Script, is inscribed on the upper edge in silver gilt with a wreath set along on the lower edge. A platinum State Emblem of India was placed in the center of the reverse side with the national motto, "Satyameva Jayate" in Devanagari Script (Sanskrit: सत्यमेव जयते; lit. "Truth alone triumphs"), inscribed in silver-gilt on the lower edge.

A year later, the design was modified. The current medal is in the shape of a sacred fig leaf, approximately 2 5/16 inches (59 mm) long, 1 7/8 inches (48 mm) wide and 1/8 inch (3.2 mm) thick and rimmed in platinum. The embossed sun burst design, made of platinum, on the obverse side of the medal has a diameter of 5/8 inch (16 mm) with rays spreading out from 5/6 inch (21 mm) to 1/2 inch (13 mm) from the center of the Sun. The words "Bharat Ratna" on the obverse side remained the same as the 1954 design as did the emblem of India and "Satyameva Jayate" on the reverse side. A 2-inch-wide (51 mm) white ribbon is attached to the medal so it can be worn around the neck. In 1957, the silver-gilt decoration was changed to burnished bronze. The medals are minted at Alipore Mint in Kolkata.

== Entitlements ==
Bharat Ratna can not be used as a prefix or suffix, however recipients may identify themselves as "Awarded Bharat Ratna by the President" or "Recipient of Bharat Ratna Award". The award does not carry any monetary benefits, but the award includes the following entitlements:

- The medallion and miniature
- A Sanad (certificate) signed by the president of India
- Treatment as a state guest by state governments when traveling within a state
- Indian missions abroad requested to facilitate recipients when requested
- Entitlement to a diplomatic passport
- Placed seventh in the Indian order of precedence
- Exemption from airport security checks
- Concessional fare on the flag carrier Air India

== Controversies and criticism ==
The Bharat Ratna has been mired in several controversies and award grants have been subject to multiple public interest litigations (PILs).

=== Subhas Chandra Bose (1992) ===
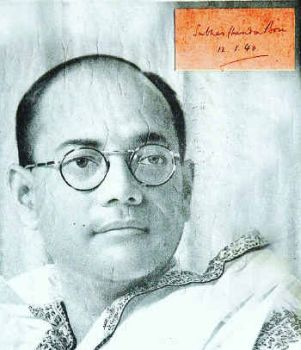
In 1992, a press release was published to confer the award posthumously on Subhas Chandra Bose, which was later cancelled post the order of the Supreme Court in 1997

On 23 January 1992, a press release was published by the president's secretariat to confer the award posthumously on Subhas Chandra Bose. The decision was contested in a public interest litigation, with the petitioner objecting to the conferral of the award and its posthumous mention of Bose, saying that honouring a personality higher than the award is "ridiculous", and it was an act of "carelessness" to classify such a person with past and future recipients. It was also contested that the award cannot be conferred to Bose posthumously as the Government had not officially accepted his death on 18 August 1945. The petitioner requested the whereabouts of Bose from 18 August 1945 to date, based on the information collected by the 1956 Shah Nawaz Committee and the 1970 Khosla Commission. Bose's family also declined to accept the award.

The Supreme Court formed a special two-judge division bench to adjudicate the case. The Solicitor General noted that to confer the award per the appropriate regulations pertaining to the Bharat Ratna, the name of the recipient must be published in The Gazette of India and entered in the recipients register maintained under the direction of the president. It was noted that only an announcement had been made by press communique, but the government had not proceeded to confer the award by publishing the name in the Gazette and entering the name in the register with the president having not conferred a Sanad (certificate). On 4 August 1997, the Supreme Court delivered an order that since the award had not been officially conferred, it cannot be revoked and declared that the press communique be treated as cancelled with the court declining to pass any judgement on the posthumous mention of Bose and his death.

=== Awards as "titles" (1992) ===
In 1992, two PILs were filed in the High Courts; one in the Kerala High Court on 13 February 1992 and another in the Madhya Pradesh High Court on 24 August 1992. Both petitions questioned the civilian awards being "Titles" per an interpretation of Article 18 (1) of the Constitution. On 25 August 1992, the Madhya Pradesh High Court issued a notice temporarily suspending all civilian awards. A special five-judge division bench of the Supreme Court was formed, which restored the awards and delivered a judgement that the "Bharat Ratna and Padma awards are not titles under Article 18 of the Constitution" on 15 December 1995.

=== Rao and Tendulkar (2013) ===
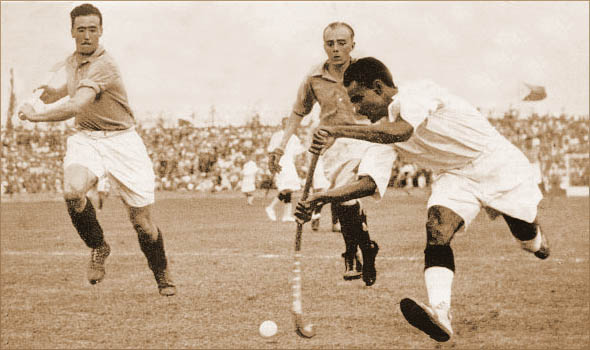
Dhyan Chand at the 1936 Summer Olympics. Widely regarded as the greatest hockey player of all time, Chand has not been conferred the Bharat Ratna

Following the announcement, in November 2013, that C. N. R. Rao and Sachin Tendulkar were to be awarded the Bharat Ratna, multiple litigations were filed challenging the awards. The litigation against Tendulkar to the Election Commission indicated that the awarding him was a violation of the model code of conduct as Tendulkar was an Indian National Congress nominated member of Rajya Sabha and the decision to award him would influence the voters of five states where elections were underway at the time. On 4 December 2013, the Election Commission rejected the petition stating that conferring the award on people from non-polling states did not amount to a violation of the code.

Another litigation was filed against then-prime minister Manmohan Singh, home minister Sushilkumar Shinde and sports minister Bhanwar Jitendra Singh for conferring of the award on Tendulkar, alleging an apparent "conspiracy to ignore" the famed Indian field hockey player Dhyan Chand. The litigation filed against Rao declared that other Indian scientists, such as Homi Bhabha and Vikram Sarabhai, had contributed more than Rao, his claim of publishing 1400 research papers was "physically impossible" and Rao had proven cases of plagiarism, hence the announcement should be annulled. The High Courts rejected all the petitions raised against Rao and Tendulkar.

=== Criticism ===
In 1977, the decision by then-prime minister Indira Gandhi to posthumously honour former Chief Minister of Tamil Nadu K. Kamaraj was criticized to have been aimed at placating the voters before the Tamil Nadu assembly elections in 1977. In 1988, the decision by then-prime minister Rajiv Gandhi (1984–89) to confer the award posthumously on former chief minister of Tamil Nadu, M. G. Ramachandran was criticized to have been aimed to influence voters prior to the Tamil Nadu assembly elections in 1989. The decision was also criticized for awarding Ramachandran before prominent independence activists B. R. Ambedkar and Vallabhbhai Patel, who were bestowed the honour later in 1990 and 1991 respectively. Later, then-prime minister V.P. Singh was criticized for posthumously honouring B. R. Ambedkar, apparently in a bid to please the Dalit voters. Later, Ravi Shankar was accused of lobbying for the award.

The posthumous conferments of the award on the recipients who died before the Indian independence in 1947 or before the award was instituted in 1954, have been criticized by various authors and historians, stating that such conferments could lead to more demands to honour people like Maurya emperor Ashoka, Mughal emperor Akbar, Maratha emperor Shivaji, poet Rabindranath Tagore, Hindu spiritualist Swami Vivekananda, self-rule activist Bal Gangadhar Tilak, and father of the nation Mahatma Gandhi. In 1991, then-prime minister P. V. Narasimha Rao was criticized for bestowing the award upon Sardar Patel in 1991, 41 years after his death in 1950; and upon Subhas Chandra Bose in 1992, who purportedly died in 1945. In 2015, the prime minister Narendra Modi's decision to award Madan Mohan Malaviya, who died in 1946, close to the local body elections in Uttar Pradesh was also met with criticism.

A few of the conferments have been criticized for honouring personalities only after they received global recognition. The award for Mother Teresa was announced in 1980, a year after she was awarded the Nobel Peace Prize. Satyajit Ray received an Academy Honorary Award in 1992 followed by the Bharat Ratna the same year. In 1999, Amartya Sen was awarded the Bharat Ratna, a year after his 1998 Nobel Memorial Prize in Economic Sciences.

== Popular demands ==
Though, as per the statutes for the Bharat Ratna, the recommendations for the award can only be made by the prime minister to the president, there have been several demands from various political parties publicly to honour their leaders. In January 2008, Bharatiya Janata Party (BJP) leader L. K. Advani wrote to then-prime minister Manmohan Singh recommending Singh's predecessor Atal Bihari Vajpayee for the award. This was immediately followed by the Communist Party of India (Marxist) lobbying for their leader, Jyoti Basu, former Chief Minister of West Bengal though Basu himself said that he would decline the honour, even if awarded. Similar demands were made by Telugu Desam Party, Bahujan Samaj Party, and Shiromani Akali Dal for their respective leaders N. T. Rama Rao, Kanshi Ram, and Parkash Singh Badal. In September 2015, regional political party Shiv Sena demanded the award for politician and ideologue Vinayak Damodar Savarkar stating that he had been "deliberately neglected by previous governments", but his family clarified that they are not making such demand and that, according to them, he did not need an award for recognition.

Per the original statutes, sports-persons were not eligible for the award; however, a revision of the rules in December 2011 made eligible "any field of human endeavour". Subsequently, several sports-persons' names were discussed; amongst them were field-hockey player Dhyan Chand and former world chess champion Viswanathan Anand. In 2011, 82 members of parliament recommended Chand's name for the award to the Prime Minister's Office. In January 2012, the Ministry of Youth Affairs and Sports forwarded his name again, this time along with 2008 Summer Olympics gold medallist shooter Abhinav Bindra and mountaineer Tenzing Norgay while Bindra had already been recommended for the award in May 2013 by the National Rifle Association of India. In July 2013, the ministry again recommended Dhyan Chand. However, in November 2013, cricketer Sachin Tendulkar became the first sports-person to receive the honour and this garnered much criticism for the government.

In 2012, a litigation was filed in the Karnataka High Court requesting the court to issue a direction to the Ministry of Home Affairs to confer the Bharat Ratna upon Mahatma Gandhi. On 27 January 2014, a counsel appearing for the petitioner noted that after multiple representations from the petitioner, they were provided with the information under RTI that the recommendations to confer the award on Gandhi have been received multiple times in the past and were forwarded to the Prime Minister's Office. A Division bench consisting of the Chief Justice and another judge, dismissed the petition stating that the subject is not amenable to any adjudication process and the nominations and conferment process is stated to be informal and in the discretion of the highest authority in the Government. The AIADMK demanded Bharat Ratna for their leader Jayalalithaa.

== List of recipients ==
Key
+ Naturalised citizen recipient	* Non-citizen recipient	# Posthumous recipient

List of recipients of Bharat Ratna
Year	Image	Recipient	State / Country (Note: For people born in India, it represents the current Indian state/UT corresponding to the birthplace. For naturalized citizens, it represents the state of domicile. For foreign recipients, it lists the country of citizenship.)	Life span	Area of Contribution	Notes
1954		C. Rajagopalachari	Tamil Nadu	1878–1972	Politics & Public Affairs	Rajagopalachari was an independence activist, who served as the last Governor-General of India from 1948 to 50). Earlier, he served as the first governor of West Bengal in 1947–48. He was the home minister in the first Nehru cabinet succeeding Sardar Vallabhai Patel in 1950. He served as the chief minister of Madras Presidency from 1937 to 1939 and later as the chief minister of Madras State between 1952 and 1954. He founded the Swatantra Party in 1959.
1954		Sarvepalli Radhakrishnan	Tamil Nadu	1888–1975	Politics & Public Affairs	Radhakrishnan served as the first Vice-President of India from 1952 to 1962 and as the second President of India from 1962 to 1967). Since 1962, his birthday of 5 September is observed annually as Teachers' Day in India.
1954		C. V. Raman	Tamil Nadu	1888–1970	Science	Raman was a physicist known for his work in the field of light scattering. He is known for the discovery of Raman scattering and Raman spectroscopy and was presented the Nobel Prize in Physics in 1930.
1955		Bhagwan Das	Uttar Pradesh	1869–1958	Education, Literature & Philosophy	Bhagwan Das was an independence activist, theosophist and educationist. He co-founded Kashi Vidyapith and worked with Madan Mohan Malaviya to establish the Banaras Hindu University.
1955		M. Visvesvaraya	Karnataka	1861–1962	Engineering	Visvesvaraya was a civil engineer and statesman. He served as the 19th Diwan of Mysore from 1912 to 1918. His birthday, 15 September, is observed annually as Engineer's Day in India.
1955		Jawaharlal Nehru	Uttar Pradesh	1889–1964	Politics & Public Affairs	Nehru was an independence activist and politician, who was the first and the longest-serving Prime Minister of India from 1947 to 1964.
1957		Govind Ballabh Pant	Uttar Pradesh	1887–1961	Politics & Public Affairs	Pant was an independence activist and politician, who served as the premier of United Provinces (1937–39, 1946–50) and as the first chief minister of Uttar Pradesh from 1950 to 1954. He served as Union Home Minister from 1955 to 1961.
1958		Dhondo Keshav Karve	Maharashtra	1858–1962	Social Reforms & Social Work	Karve was a social reformer and educator, known for his work on education for women and remarriage of Hindu widows. He established the Widow Marriage Association (1883), Hindu Widows Home (1896), and started Shreemati Nathibai Damodar Thackersey Women's University in 1916.
1961		Bidhan Chandra Roy	West Bengal	1882–1962	Education, Literature & Philosophy	Roy was a physician, politician and educationist. He served as the second Chief Minister of West Bengal from 1948 to 1962 and is known as the "Maker of Modern West Bengal". His birthday on 1 July is observed annually as the National Doctors' Day in India.
1961		Purushottam Das Tandon	Uttar Pradesh	1882–1962	Politics & Public Affairs	Tandon was an independence activist and politician, who served as the speaker of the Uttar Pradesh Legislative Assembly from 1937 to 1950. He was actively involved in a campaign to get official language status to Hindi.
1962		Rajendra Prasad	Bihar	1884–1963	Politics & Public Affairs	Prasad was an independence activist, lawyer and statesman, who was associated with Mahatma Gandhi in the Champaran Satyagraha in Bihar and non-cooperation movement. Became the president of Constituent Assembly of India. He was later elected as the first President of India (1950–62).
1963		Zakir Husain	Telangana	1897–1969	Politics & Public Affairs	Husain was an independence activist and philosopher, who served as the Vice Chancellor of Aligarh Muslim University (1948–56) and the Governor of Bihar (1957–62). Later, he was elected as second vice-president of India (1962–67) and went on to become the third President of India (1967–69).
1963		Pandurang Vaman Kane	Maharashtra	1880–1972	Education, Literature & Philosophy	Kane was an indologist and Sanskrit scholar, known for his five volume literary work, History of Dharmaśāstra: Ancient and Medieval Religious and Civil Law in India.
1966		Lal Bahadur Shastri^{#}	Uttar Pradesh	1904–1966	Politics & Public Affairs	Shastri was an independence activist, known for his slogan "Jai Jawan Jai Kisan" ("Hail to the Soldier, hail to the Farmer"). He served as second Prime Minister of India (1964–66) and led the country during the Indo-Pakistani War of 1965.
1971		Indira Gandhi	Uttar Pradesh	1917–1984	Politics & Public Affairs	Indira Gandhi was the Prime Minister of India during 1966–77 and 1980–84. She is known as the "Iron Lady of India", as she led India during the Indo-Pakistani War of 1971 and the concurrent Bangladesh Liberation War which led to the formation of Bangladesh.
1975		V. V. Giri	Odisha	1894–1980	Politics & Public Affairs	Giri was an independence activist, who organized trade unions and facilitated their participation in the fight for independence. Post-independence, Giri held positions of Governor of Uttar Pradesh, Kerala and Mysore state and other cabinet ministries. He became the first acting president and was eventually elected as the fourth President of India, serving from 1969 to 1974.
1976		K. Kamaraj^{#}	Tamil Nadu	1903–1975	Politics & Public Affairs	Kamaraj was an independence activist, freedom fighter, and politician who served as the chief minister of Tamil Nadu for over nine years, between 1954 and 1963. He was known as the "King Maker", as he was the president of the Indian National Congress, when electing Lal Bahadur Shastri the prime minister after Nehru's death and Indira Gandhi after Shastri's death, his followers idolized him as "Perunthalaivar" (Great Leader). He is the founder of the Indian political party Indian National Congress (Organisation).
1980		Mother Teresa ^{+}	West Bengal (b.Skopje, North Macedonia)	1910–1997	Social Reforms & Social Work	Mother Teresa was a Catholic nun and founder of the Missionaries of Charity, a religious congregation, which manages homes for diseased people. She was the recipient of the Nobel Peace Prize for her humanitarian work in 1979. She was beatified on 19 October 2003 by Pope John Paul II and canonised on 4 September 2016 by Pope Francis.
1983		Vinoba Bhave^{#}	Maharashtra	1895–1982	Social Reforms & Social Work	Bhave was an independence activist, social reformer and an associate of Mahatma Gandhi, known for his Bhoodan movement. He was known by the honorific title "Acharya" ("teacher") and was awarded the Ramon Magsaysay Award (1958) for his humanitarian work.
1987		Abdul Ghaffar Khan^{*}	Pakistan	1890–1988	Politics & Public Affairs	Khan was an independence activist, a follower of Mahatma Gandhi and an advocate of Hindu–Muslim unity in the subcontinent. He was known as "Frontier Gandhi" and was part of the Khilafat Movement in 1920 and founded the Khudai Khidmatgar ("Red Shirt movement") in 1929.
1988		M. G. Ramachandran (Note: In 1960, Ramachandran was awarded the Padma Shri, the fourth highest civilian award, but declined as the invitation was written in the Devanagari script and not Tamil.)^{#}	Tamil Nadu	1917–1987	Politics & Public Affairs	M. G. Ramachandran (M.G.R.) served as the chief minister of Tamil Nadu for over ten years, from 1977 to 1987, making him the first actor to hold that position in the Republic of India. He is regarded as one of the greatest political leaders and actors in Tamil Nadu. His charisma and commitment to public service garnered him a devoted following, and he continues to be a prominent figure in both Tamil cinema and politics. His legacy still shapes the film industry and the political landscape of the region. His followers revere him as "Puratchi Thalaivar" (Revolutionary Leader). He founded the All India Anna Dravida Munnetra Kazhagam (AIADMK), a political party in India that governed Tamil Nadu for over 30 years, making it the longest-serving party in the state's history.
1990		B. R. Ambedkar^{#}	Madhya Pradesh	1891–1956	Social Reforms & Social Work	Ambedkar was a social reformer, lawyer and a Dalit leader, who headed the committee drafting the Indian Constitution while also serving as the first Law Minister of India later. Ambedkar campaigned against the social discrimination of Dalits and the caste system in India. He was associated with the Dalit Buddhist movement after converting to Buddhism on 14 October 1956.
1990		Nelson Mandela^{*}	South Africa	1918–2013	Politics & Public Affairs	Mandela was the leader of the Anti-Apartheid Movement in South Africa and later served as the President of South Africa (1994–99). Often called as the "Gandhi of South Africa", Mandela's African National Congress movement was influenced by Gandhian philosophy. In 1993, he was awarded the Nobel Peace Prize.
1991		Rajiv Gandhi^{#}	Uttar Pradesh	1944–1991	Politics & Public Affairs	Rajiv Gandhi was a pilot turned politician, who served as the sixth Prime Minister of India serving from 1984 to 1989.
1991		Vallabhbhai Patel^{#}	Gujarat	1875–1950	Politics & Public Affairs	Patel was an independence activist, who served as the first Deputy Prime Minister of India (1947–50) and home minister. Patel was known as the "Iron Man of India" and by the title of "Sardar" ("Leader") Patel and was instrumental in the accession of the princely states into the Indian union.
1991		Morarji Desai	Gujarat	1896–1995	Politics & Public Affairs	Desai was an independence activist and politician, who served as the fourth Prime Minister of India from 1977 to 1979 and was the first to be not from the Indian National Congress. He was also awarded the Nishan-e-Pakistan, the highest civilian award given by the Government of Pakistan. Desai had earlier abolished the awards while he was in the office of Prime Minister for it being "worthless and politicised".
1992		Abul Kalam Azad (Note: Earlier, Abul Kalam Azad had refused the Bharat Ratna while he was the Education Minister of India (1947–58) citing that the selection committee members should not themselves be the recipients.)^{#}	West Bengal	1888–1958	Politics & Public Affairs	Azad was an independence activist and politician, who served as the first education minister of India. His birthday on 11 November is observed annually as the National Education Day in India.
1992		J. R. D. Tata	Maharashtra	1904–1993	Industry	Tata was an industrialist, philanthropist, and aviation pioneer, who served as the chairman of the business conglomerate Tata Group. He is the founder of various educational and research institutes and businesses. He is the only Industrialist to receive a Bharat Ratna.
1992		Satyajit Ray	West Bengal	1922–1992	Arts	Ray was a film director. He directed his first film Pather Panchali in 1955 and is credited with bringing world recognition to Indian cinema. In 1984, Ray was awarded the Dadasaheb Phalke Award, India's highest award in cinema and in 1991, he received Academy Honorary Award.
1997		Gulzarilal Nanda	Punjab	1898–1998	Politics & Public Affairs	Nanda was an independence activist and politician, who served as the acting Prime Minister of India in 1964 and 1966 and as the deputy chairman of the Planning Commission.
1997		Aruna Asaf Ali^{#}	West Bengal	1909–1996	Politics & Public Affairs	Ali was an independence activist, known for hoisting the tricolor flag of India in Bombay during the Quit India Movement in 1942. Post Independence, she was elected as Delhi's first mayor in 1958.
1997		A. P. J. Abdul Kalam	Tamil Nadu	1931–2015	Aerospace Science	Kalam was an aerospace and defence scientist, who later served as the eleventh President of India from 2002 until 2007. He was involved in the development of India's first satellite launch vehicle SLV III and the Integrated Guided Missile Development Program, while working for various space and defence research agencies and has served as the scientific advisor to the defence minister, Secretary for defence research and director of Defence Research and Development Organisation.
1998		M. S. Subbulakshmi	Tamil Nadu	1916–2004	Arts	Subbulakshmi was a Carnatic classical vocalist, known for her songs, religious chantings and compositions. She was the first Indian musician to receive the Ramon Magsaysay award for her public service.
1998		C. Subramaniam	Tamil Nadu	1910–2000	Politics & Public Affairs	Subramaniam was an independence activist and politician, who served as the minister of agriculture from 1964 to 1966 and later as minister of finance and defence. He is known for his contribution towards the Green Revolution in India.
1999		Jayaprakash Narayan^{#}	Bihar	1902–1979	Social Reforms & Social Work	Narayan was an independence activist and social reformer. He was commonly referred as "Loknayak" ("People's Leader") and is known for the Total Revolution Movement initiated during the mid-1970s against the then government of India.
1999		Amartya Sen	West Bengal	b. 1933	Economics & Administrative Reforms	Sen is an economist and the winner of the Nobel memorial prize in economic sciences in 1998.
1999		Gopinath Bordoloi^{#}	Assam	1890–1950	Politics & Public Affairs	Bordoloi was an independence activist and politician, who served as the first chief minister of Assam (1946–50). His was instrumental in uniting Assam with India when parts of it wanted to accede to Pakistan.
1999		Ravi Shankar	Uttar Pradesh	1920–2012	Arts	Ravi Shankar was a musician and sitar player. He has won four Grammy Awards and is often considered "the world's best-known exponent of Hindustani classical music".
2001		Lata Mangeshkar	Maharashtra	1929–2022	Arts	Mangeshkar was a playback singer, known as the "nightingale of India". She started her career in the 1940s and has sung songs in over 36 languages. In 1989, Mangeshkar was awarded the Dadasaheb Phalke Award, India's highest award in cinema.
2001		Bismillah Khan	Bihar	1916–2006	Arts	Khan was a Hindustani classical shehnai player, who played the instrument for more than eight decades and is credited to have brought the instrument to the centre stage of Indian music.
2009		Bhimsen Joshi	Karnataka	1922–2011	Arts	Joshi was a Hindustani classical vocalist, who was a disciple of Kirana gharana and is widely known for the Khyal genre of singing.
2014		C. N. R. Rao	Karnataka	b. 1934	Science	Rao is a chemist and a scientist specializing in solid state chemistry. He has honorary doctorates from 86 universities and has authored around 1,800 research publications and 56 books.
2014		Sachin Tendulkar	Maharashtra	b. 1973	Sports	Tendulkar is a cricketer, who is regarded as one of the greatest batters of all time. Having debuted in 1989, Tendulkar played 664 international cricket matches, scoring more than 34,000 in a career spanning over two decades and holds various cricket records.. Sachin is the youngest recipient of Bharat Ratna (40) and is the only recipient from Sports.
2015		Atal Bihari Vajpayee	Madhya Pradesh	1924–2018	Politics & Public Affairs	Vajpayee was a politician, who served as the Prime Minister of India three times in 1996, 1998 and from 1999 to 2004. He was a parliamentarian for over four decades and was elected nine times to the Lok Sabha, twice to the Rajya Sabha, also serving as the minister of external affairs during 1977–79.
2015		Madan Mohan Malaviya^{#}	Uttar Pradesh	1861–1946	Education, Literature & Philosophy	Malaviya was a scholar and educational reformer, who founded the Akhil Bharatiya Hindu Mahasabha (1906) and Banaras Hindu University, while serving as the university's vice-chancellor from 1919 until 1938. He was the President of Indian National Congress for four terms and was the chairman of Hindustan Times from 1924 to 1946.
2019		Pranab Mukherjee	West Bengal	1935–2020	Politics & Public Affairs	Mukherjee was a politician who served as the 13th President of India from 2012 until 2017. In a career spanning five decades, Mukherjee had been a leader of the Indian National Congress and had occupied several ministerial portfolios in the Government of India. Prior to his election as President, he was finance minister from 2009 to 2012.
2019		Bhupen Hazarika^{#}	Assam	1926–2011	Arts	Hazarika was a playback singer, lyricist, musician, poet and film-maker, widely known as Sudhakantha. His songs, written and sung mainly in the Assamese language by himself, are themed around universal justice and peace and have been translated and sung in many languages.
2019		Nanaji Deshmukh^{#}	Maharashtra	1916–2010	Social Reforms & Social Work	Deshmukh was a social activist and politician, who worked in the fields of education, health, and rural self-reliance. He was a leader of the Bharatiya Jana Sangh and also served as a member of the Rajya Sabha.
2024		Karpoori Thakur^{#}	Bihar	1924–1988	Social Reforms & Social Work	Thakur was a politician, who served two terms as the 11th Chief Minister of Bihar, from 1970 to 1971, and from 1977 to 1979. In 1978, he introduced the reservation policy in state government jobs.
2024		L. K. Advani	Delhi	b. 1927	Politics & Public Affairs	Advani is a politician who served as the 7th Deputy Prime Minister of India from 2002 to 2004. He is one of the co-founders of Bharatiya Janata Party and is credited with scripting the rise of the BJP as a major political force through the Ram Janmabhoomi Movement.
2024		P. V. Narasimha Rao^{#}	Telangana	1921–2004	Economics & Administrative Reforms	Narasimha Rao, was an Indian lawyer and politician who served as the 9th prime minister from 1991 to 1996. He was the first Prime Minister from South India. He is known for introducing various liberal reforms to India's economy.
2024		Charan Singh^{#}	Uttar Pradesh	1902–1987	Politics & Public Affairs	Charan Singh was an Indian politician and an independence activist who served as the 5th prime minister from 1979 to 1980. He is known as the "Champion of India's peasants". He is credited for bringing radical land reform measures and bringing uniformity in the farm sector. These reforms were implemented through the Debt Redemption Bill, the Land Holding Act, and the Zamindari Abolition Act. He was the founder of the political party Lokdal in 1980.
2024		M. S. Swaminathan^{#}	Tamil Nadu	1925–2023	Agricultural Science	Swaminathan was an Indian agronomist, geneticist and administrator, who was a global leader of the green revolution. He was one of the major architects of green revolution in India known for his leadership and role in introducing and further developing high-yielding varieties of wheat and rice.

== See also ==
- Orders, decorations, and medals of India
- Padma Vibhushan
- Padma Bhushan
- Padma Shri

== Bibliography ==
- Basu, Kanailal (2010). Netaji: Rediscovered. AuthorHouse. ISBN 978-1-4490-5569-1.
- Bhattacherje, S. B. (2009). Encyclopaedia of Indian Events & Dates. Sterling Publishers Pvt. Ltd. ISBN 978-81-207-4074-7.
- Daniel, P. (1958). The Indian Review. Vol. 58. G. A. Natesan & Company.
- Edgar, Thorpe (2011). The Pearson General Knowledge Manual 2011. Pearson Education India. ISBN 978-81-317-5640-9.
- Guha, Ramachandra (2001). An Anthropologist Among the Marxists and Other Essays. Orient Blackswan. ISBN 978-81-7824-001-5.
- Gulzar; Nihalani, Govind; Chatterjee, Saibal, eds. (2003). Encyclopaedia of Hindi Cinema. Popular Prakashan. ISBN 978-81-7991-066-5.
- Hoiberg, Dale; Ramchandani, Indu (2000). Students' Britannica India. Vol. 1–5. Popular Prakashan. ISBN 978-81-7156-112-4.
- Osnes, Beth (2013). Theatre for Women's Participation in Sustainable Development. Routledge. ISBN 978-1-136-72846-4.
- Sainty, Guy Stair (2011). World Orders of Knighthood and Merit. University of Michigan Press. ISBN 978-0-9711966-7-4.
- Taneja, V. R.; Taneja, S. (2000). Educational Thinkers. Atlantic Publishers & Dist. ISBN 978-81-7156-112-4.
- Weber, Thomas (2004). Gandhi as Disciple and Mentor. Cambridge University Press. p. 138. ISBN 978-1-139-45657-9.
