= Thomas Weber =

Thomas Weber may refer to:

- Thomas Weber (engineer) (born 1954), German engineer at Mercedes-Benz Group
- Thomas Weber (historian) (born 1974), German historian, university lecturer and writer
- Thomas Weber (American football) (born 1987), American football placekicker
- Thomas Weber (footballer) (born 1993), Austrian footballer
- Thomas E. Weber, American journalist
