= Statecraft =

Art of conducting public affairs

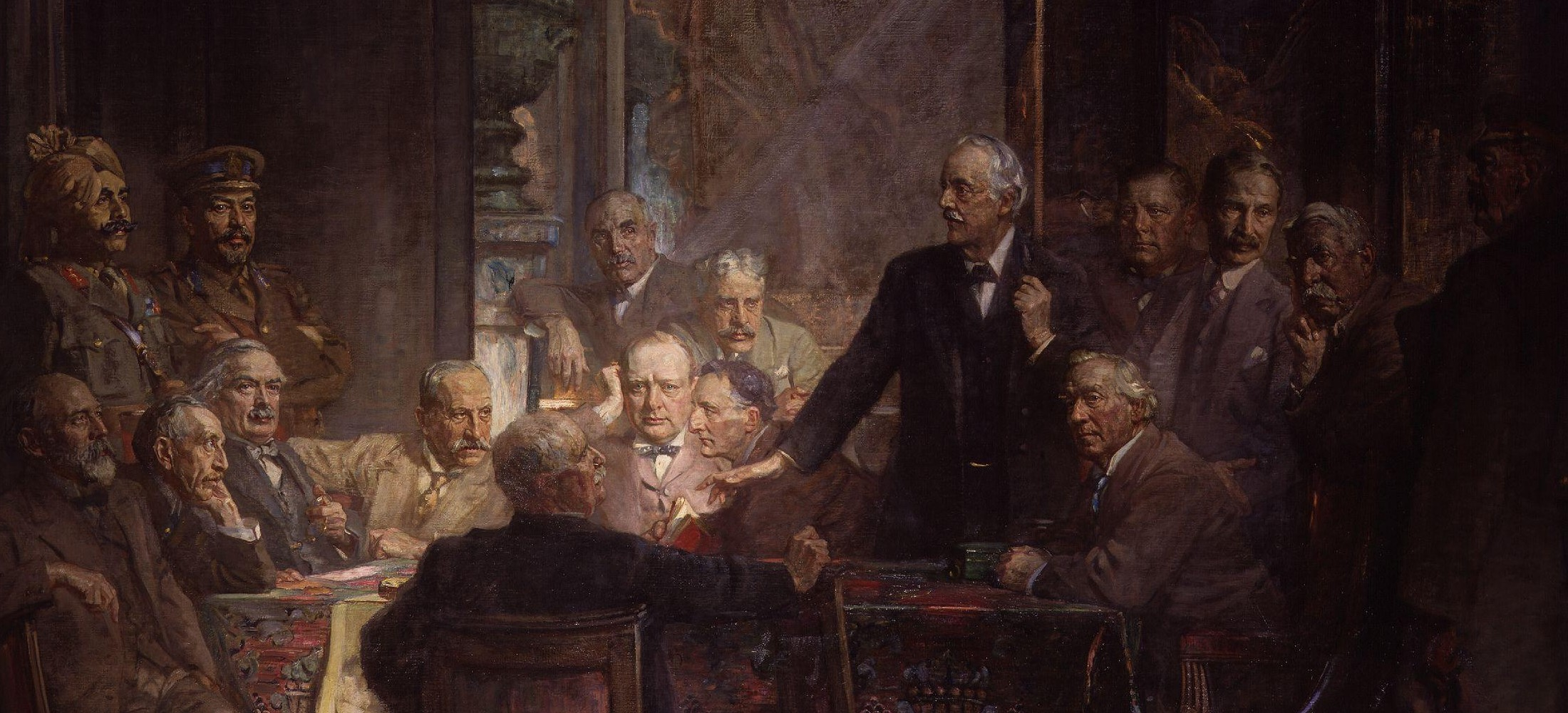

Statecraft (stē^{i}tkrɑft). [f. state sb. + craft.]
The art of conducting state affairs; statesmanship. Sometimes with sinister implication: Crafty or overreaching statesmanship.

— Oxford English Dictionary, first edition

Statecraft (also statesmanship) is the art of conducting public affairs. A statesman, stateswoman, or statesperson is someone who practices statecraft. As a contested concept, statecraft is difficult to define.

== Definition and conceptions ==
The word statecraft, dating from the 1640s, refers to the art of conducting public affairs, which entails leading a state or country. Statecraft is thus said to be the practice of a statesman (derived from the Dutch staatsman), stateswoman, or statesperson. Statecraft is a synonym of statesmanship, but in a narrow form may also be synonymous with public diplomacy. Beyond a superficial level, however, finding an exact definition of statecraft is difficult and it is a contested concept which political scientist Wilfred M. McClay calls "always a tricky, elusive matter—hard to come by, hard to measure, and hard even to define or describe."

The Ancient Greek philosopher Plato conceived of the statesman in his dialogue of the same name as one who oversees and guides the work of many others:

There is an art which controls all these arts. It is concerned with the laws and with all that belongs to the life of the community. It weaves all into its unified fabric with perfect skill. It is a universal art and so we call it by a name of universal scope. That name is one which I believe to belong to this art and to this alone, the name of 'Statesmanship'.

Plato's conception of statesmanship greatly influenced Sir Thomas More, who considered the "statesman" to be a virtuous leader armed with both the science and art of ruling. He sought to personally cultivate what he conceived as the three elements of statesmanship, those being its science, art, and presupposed personal virtue.

According to Andrew Brady Spalding, the word statecraft may allow a narrow and a broad understanding. The narrow conception can be defined as "managing relations between states to the advantage of one's own country", a traditional usage dating back to Niccolò Machiavelli. Otherwise, the term can be used broadly, as Colin Talbot puts it, "for the study of states and governments and how to successfully build, run and adapt them, internally and externally."

== Elder statesman ==
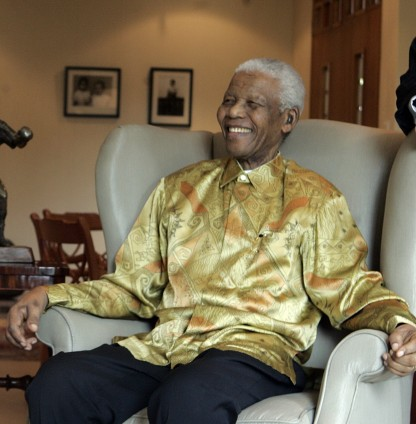
As an elder statesman in 2009, Nelson Mandela founded The Elders, an association of elder statespeople

An elder statesman is a retired politician whose influence extends beyond their official term, permitting them to unofficially advise incumbent politicians. The term originally referred to a member of the genrō, retired statesmen who were consulted by the emperor of Japan.

Although the activities and influence of elder statesmen remains understudied, Taro Tsuda argues that the modern increase of life expectancy has likewise increased the influence of elder statesmen, which alongside the significance of informal politics and institutions compels the study of such statesmen.

For example, Nelson Mandela was often described as the "world's elder statesman" due to his political influence beyond his presidency of South Africa as a key figure of the globalized anti-Apartheid movement. Mandela founded The Elders in 2009, an association of elder statespeople with the goal of combining their collective experience to address problems of peace and human rights, who counted among their members Jimmy Carter and Kofi Annan.
