= Interrogating My Chandal Life: An Autobiography of a Dalit =

Autobiography by dalit writer Manoranjan Byapari

- Author: Manoranjan Byapari
- Original title: Itibritte Chandal Jivan (2014)
- Translator: Sipra Mukherjee
- Language: English (translated), Bengali (original)
- Subject: Autobiography, Dalit experience, caste
- Genre: Memoir, autobiography
- Published: 2018
- Publisher: Sage Publications India
- Publication place: India
- Media type: Print (hardcover & paperback)
- Pages: 357
- ISBN: 978-93-813-4530-6

Interrogating My Chandal Life: An Autobiography of a Dalit is an autiobiography by Indian dalit writer and activist Manoranjan Byapari. The original work in Bengali was titled Itibritte Chandal Jivan and published in 2014, followed by its English translation by Sipra Mukherjee in 2018 by Sage Publishing. The book chronicles the experience of being a Dalit from Namashudra or Chandal community of Bengal in the post-partition India. It is considered to be the first autobiography by a Bengali dalit.

The memoir presents an intersectional account of dalit struggle and poverty, especially in the context of post-partition India when Bengal was partitioned into East Bengal and West Bengal. Uma Mahadevan-Dasgupta writing for The Hindu noted the simplicity of prose but "dense with memories, ... [that] it gives the sense that more is left unsaid."
