= Department of Health & Family Welfare (West Bengal) =

Indian state government ministry

Department overview
- Jurisdiction: Government of West Bengal
- Headquarters: Swasthya Bhawan, Bidhannagar
- Minister responsible: Dr. Sharadwat Mukherjee, Cabinet Minister
- Deputy Minister responsible: Sumana Sarkar, MoS
- Department executive: Narayan Swaroop Nigam, IAS, Principal Secretary
- Website: wbhealth.gov.in

The Department of Health & Family Welfare of West Bengal is a Government of West Bengal ministry. It is a ministry mainly responsible for maintaining and developing the health care system in the State.

== Ministerial Team ==
The ministerial team is headed by the Cabinet Minister for Health & Family Welfare, who may or may not be supported by Ministers of State. Civil servants are assigned to them to manage the ministers' office and ministry.

The current Minister in charge is Dr. Sharadwat Mukherjee.

== Governance ==
The Health and Family Welfare (H&FW) Department is organized into a number of Directorates whose work is monitored and coordinated by the H&FW Department at the Secretariat. This Department is headed by the Health Secretary who oversees the working of various Directorates and develops various policies which gets implemented after the approval of the Chief Minister and the Minister-in-charge.

The State Health Administration has two arms, the Secretariat and the Directorate of Health Services. The Secretariat is headed by the Additional Chief Secretary/ Principal Secretary who is a senior officer of the Indian Administrative Service assisted by Special, Joint, Deputy and Assistant Secretaries. The Director of Health Services and ex-officio Secretary heads the Directorate and is the Chief Technical Advisor to the State Government on all matters related to medical and public health. He is assisted by a number of Additional, Joint, Deputy and Assistant Directors.

The health care system has primary health care network, a secondary care system comprising district and sub-divisional hospitals and tertiary hospitals providing speciality and super speciality care. Each of the eighteen districts is headed by a Chief Medical Officer of Health (C.M.O.H.), assisted by Deputy and Assistant C.M.O.H.s, whose responsibility is to manage the primary health care sector and ensure the effective implementation of the various medical, health and family welfare programmes. The secondary level hospitals are headed by medically trained superintendents who report to the C.M.O.H. and are accountable to a hospital management committee. At the block level, the Block Medical Officer is responsible for providing services and for monitoring and supervising the primary health centres and health programme implementation.

The medical manpower in the State Health System is provided by the State Health Service and in the teaching institutions by the Medical Education Service. The training activities are mainly organised at the Institute of Health & Family Welfare, Bidhannagar, Kolkata, and also at various training schools.
