= List of social reformers of India =

This is a list of social reformers of India.

Social reformers are individuals who actively challenge and seek to change societal norms and structures that perpetuate inequality and injustice. Their work addresses systemic issues such as caste discrimination, gender bias, economic disparity, and access to education and healthcare.

== Notable social reformers ==
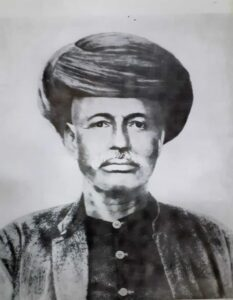
Mahatma Jyotiba Phule

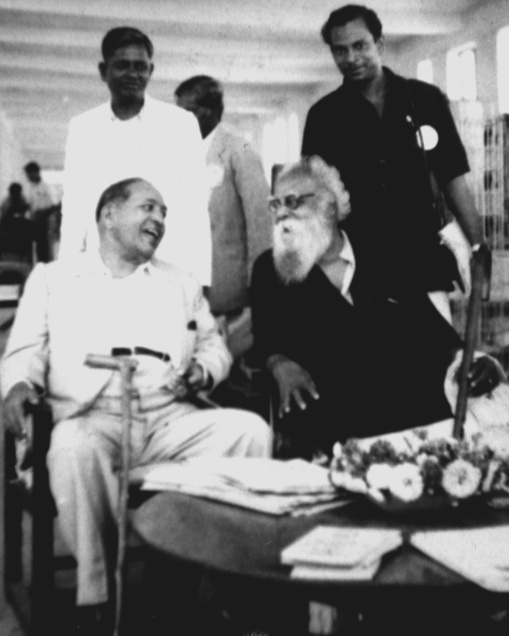
Periyar with B. R. Ambedkar

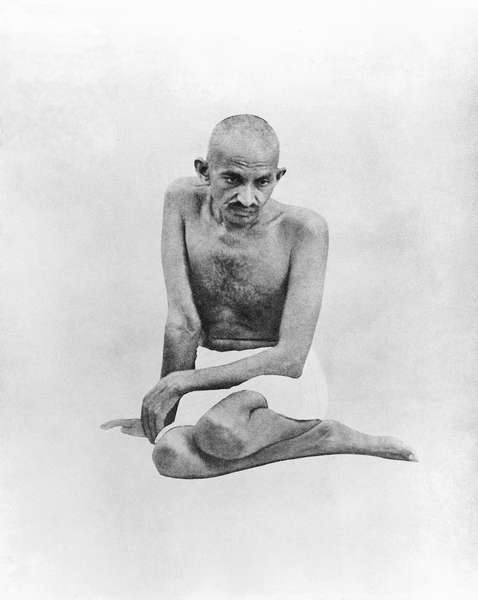
Mahatma Gandhi

- Mahatma Jyotiba Phule
- Savitribai Phule
- Fatima Sheikh
- B. R. Ambedkar
- Periyar E. V. Ramasamy
- Kabir
- Ravidas
- Kanshi Ram
- Mahatma Gandhi
- Bhagat Singh
- Ramswaroop Verma
- Ram Manohar Lohia
- Babu Jagdeo Prasad
- Karpoori Thakur
- Sukhdev Thorat
- Gopal Krishna Gokhale
- Dadabhai Naoroji
- Annie Besant
- Aurobindo Ghosh
- Sister Nivedita
- Tarabai Shinde
- Muthulakshmi Reddy
- Kandukuri Veeresalingam
- Birsa Munda
- G. Subramania Iyer
- Kamaladevi Chattopadhyay
- Durgabai Deshmukh
- Bal Gangadhar Tilak
- Sarojini Naidu
- Madan Mohan Malaviya
- Lala Lajpat Rai
- Swami Shraddhanand
- Subramanya Bharathiyaar
- Swami Vivekananda
- Pattukkottai Alagiri
- Ishwarchandra Vidyasagar
- Ela Bhatt
- Ramanandacharya
- Meera Bai
- Namdev
- Guru Nanak
- Guru Angad
- Guru Arjan Dev
- Guru Hargobind
- Guru Har Krishan
- Guru Tegh Bahadur
- Guru Gobind Singh
- Tukaram
- Jnaneshwar
- Chaitanya Mahaprabhu
- Narsinh Mehta
- Andal
- Madhvacharya
- Dnyaneshwar
- Purandara Dasa
- Netaji Subhash Chandra Bose
- Kanaka Dasa
- Sankardev
- Dadu Dayal
- Bahinabai
- Tukdoji Maharaj
- Akka Mahadevi
- Anna Hazare
- Debendranath Tagore
- Dwarkanath Ganguly
- Gopal Ganesh Agarkar
- Ramabai Ranade
- Mahadev Govind Ranade
- Chinmayananda Saraswati
- Pandita Ramabai
- Harichand Thakur
- Baba Amte
- Eknath
- Tarabai Shinde
- Javaid Rahi
- Pandurang Shastri Athavale
- Basavanna
- Vinoba Bhave
- Gopal Hari Deshmukh
- Virchand Gandhi
- Narayana Guru
- Kazi Nazrul Islam
- Acharya Balshastri Jambhekar
- Dhondo Keshav Karve
- T. K. Madhavan
- Ramakrishna Paramhansa
- Kuriakose Elias Chavara
- Mahadev Govind Ranade
- Kirity Roy
- Raja Ram Mohan Roy
- Begum Rokeya
- Anurag Chauhan
- Sahajanand Saraswati
- Prabhat Ranjan Sarkar
- Keshub Chandra Sen
- Shahu of Kolhapur
- Shishunala Sharif
- Vitthal Ramji Shinde
- Ramalinga Swamigal
- Kandukuri Veeresalingam
- Prabodhankar Thackeray
- Karsandas Mulji
- Arattupuzha Velayudha Panicker
- Chattampi Swamikal
- Sevalal Maharaj
- Kailash Satyarthi
