= Nagendranath Chattopadhyay =

Nagendranath Chattopadhyay was a Sanskrit scholar and noted grammarian who lived in the early 20th century at Salepur village, approximately five miles from the sub-divisional headquarters in Arambagh in Hooghly district, West Bengal, India.

== Academic career ==
Chattopadhyay passed the entrance examination and graduated with a B.A. (Hons) degree from the University of Calcutta. One of his classmates was the writer Khagendranath Mitra.

== Teaching career ==
Nagendranath joined the 'Bhagabati Vidyalaya' at Birsingha village, appointed as the headmaster of the institution established by Ishwarchandra Vidyasagar for female education, but he left after a short time. It is reported that at the time the institute was a mere mud thatched and straw-shedded hut.

One Nabagopal Das, the SDO (Sub-Divisional Officer) of Arambagh Subdivision arranged for his joining as the headmaster at Arambagh High English School, where he served for the rest of his career, spanning more than 40 years. There is an incident with a school inspector which merits description as it fully shows his in-depth knowledge of grammar. The story goes "once an inspector came to his school and observed him teaching English grammar to the students. Chattopadhyay used the term 'averse from' instead of the Nesfield style 'averse to'. Shocked, the inspector openly challenged him. To his disbelief, Chattopadhyay pulled out from the library the treatise of Rosewood indicating that it advocates 'averse from'. He also presented with the arguments indicating his grammatical sense was extraordinary." The inspector was awed by Chattopadhyay.

He also worked on society problems and in one occasion, received a silver medal and a silver engraved stick from the Bengal government due to his part in successfully observing the 'Water Hyacinth Day' in Teghory Basantapore nearer to Arambagh in the Kana Nadi.

== Administrative career ==
He was also a member of the district board. One 'Kala-ajar centre' was also opened which was in no small part due to his endeavour. He was an elected non-party member of the district Union Board until the later West Bengal chief minister Prafulla Chandra Sen defeated him in 1937; even then their relation was reported to be cordial and warm.

== Family ==
Nagendrantah Chattopadhyay had four sons and one daughter. Nagendranath Chattopadhyay's grandson Dr Rabiranjan Chattopadhyay was a professor of Burdwan University in West Bengal and is a current member of West Bengal Legislative Assembly representing Bardhaman Dakhsin constituency. He also served as a cabinet minister in West Bengal government from 2011 to 2016.
