= Ashim Kumar Majhi =

Indian politician (born 1963)

Ashim Kumar Majhi অসীম কুমার মাঝি
- Constituency: Balagarh 191

MLA of Balagarh Vidhan Sabha Constituency
- In office 2011–2021
- Preceded by: Bhuban Pramanick
- Succeeded by: Manoranjan Byapari

Personal details
- Born: 20 February 1963 (age 63) Jirat, Hooghly, West Bengal
- Party: All India Trinamool Congress
- Children: 1
- Education: Passed Madhyamik from Jirat Colony High School; Passed Higher Secondary from Balagarh High School in the year 1982; B.Com Graduate from Kalna College, affiliated to University of Burdwan in the year 1986

Ashim Kumar Majhi is an Indian politician, born in Jirat, Hooghly was elected as MLA of Balagarh Vidhan Sabha Constituency in West Bengal Legislative Assembly in 2011 and 2016, as an All India Trinamool Congress candidate.

State Legislative Assembly
Preceded by Bhuban Pramanick (CPI-M)	Member of the West Bengal Legislative Assembly from Balagarh Assembly constituency 2011–	Incumbent
