= Sumana Sarkar =

Indian politician in West Bengal

Minister of State, Government of West Bengal
- Incumbent
- Assumed office 1 June 2026
- Governor: R. N. Ravi
- Chief Minister: Suvendu Adhikari
- Department: Heath & Family Welfare
- Cabinet Minister: Dr. Sharadwat Mukherjee

Member of the West Bengal Legislative Assembly
- Incumbent
- Assumed office 4 May 2026
- Preceded by: Manoranjan Byapari
- Constituency: Balagarh

Personal details
- Born: 1982 (age 43–44) Hooghly, West Bengal, India
- Party: Bharatiya Janata Party
- Parent: Biren Sarkar
- Education: Rabindra Bharati University
- Occupation: Tutor
- Profession: Politician

Sumana Sarkar (Bengali: সুমনা সরকার) is an Indian politician from West Bengal. She is a member of West Bengal Legislative Assembly, from Balagarh Assembly constituency. She is a member of Bharatiya Janata Party.She is currently serving as the Minister of State for Health and Family Welfare of West Bengal.

She along with other 18 members sworn in as a Minister of State for the state of West Bengal on 1 June 2026.

== Early life and education ==
Sarkar is from Somra, Hooghly of West Bengal. She has done Master of Arts in History from Rabindra Bharati University in the year of 2010.

== Political career ==
She is a member of West Bengal Legislative Assembly, from Balagarh Assembly constituency.

=== Electoral performance ===
West Bengal Legislative Assembly
Year	Constituency	Party	Votes	%	Opponent	Party	Votes	%	Margin	Result
2026	Balagarh	BJP	1,25,624	55.58	Ranjan Dhara	AITC	83,710	37.03	41,914	Won

== See also ==
- 2026 West Bengal Legislative Assembly election
- List of chief ministers of West Bengal
- West Bengal Legislative Assembly
