= Balagarh Assembly constituency =

West Bengal Legislative Assembly constituency

Balagarh
- Constituency No. 191 for the West Bengal Legislative Assembly
- Interactive Map Outlining Balagarh Assembly Constituency

Constituency details
- Country: India
- Region: East India
- State: West Bengal
- District: Hooghly
- Lok Sabha constituency: Hooghly
- Established: 1951
- Total electors: 207,702
- Reservation: SC

Member of Legislative Assembly
- 18th West Bengal Legislative Assembly
- Incumbent Sumana Sarkar
- Party: BJP
- Alliance: NDA
- Elected year: 2026

Balagarh Assembly constituency is an assembly constituency in Hooghly district in the Indian state of West Bengal. It is reserved for scheduled castes.

== Overview ==
As per orders of the Delimitation Commission, No. 191 Balagarh Assembly constituency (SC) is composed of the following: Balagarh community development block and Chandrahati I, Chandrahati II, Digsui and Mogra I gram panchayats of Chinsurah Mogra community development block.

Balagarh Assembly constituency is part of No. 28 Hooghly Lok Sabha constituency. It was earlier part of Katwa Lok Sabha constituency.

== Members of the Legislative Assembly ==
Year	Name	Party
1951	Brindaban Chattopadhyay	Indian National Congress
1957	Bejoy Krishna Modak	Communist Party of India
1962	Brindaban Chattopadhyay	Indian National Congress
1967	H.K. Das	Indian National Congress
1969	Abinash Pramanick	Communist Party of India (Marxist)
1971	Abinash Pramanick	Communist Party of India (Marxist)
1972	Biren Sarkar	Indian National Congress
1977	Abinash Pramanick	Communist Party of India (Marxist)
1982	Abinash Pramanick	Communist Party of India (Marxist)
1987	Abinash Pramanick	Communist Party of India (Marxist)
1991	Abinash Pramanick	Communist Party of India (Marxist)
1996	Dibakanta Routh	Communist Party of India (Marxist)
2001	Dibakanta Routh	Communist Party of India (Marxist)
2006	Dibakanta Routh	Communist Party of India (Marxist)
2007^	Bhuban Pramanick	Communist Party of India (Marxist)
2011	Ashim Kumar Majhi	Trinamool Congress
2016	Ashim Kumar Majhi	Trinamool Congress
2021	Manoranjan Byapari	Trinamool Congress
2026	Sumana Sarkar	Bharatiya Janata Party

- denotes ^ by-election

== Election results ==
=== 2026 ===
2026 West Bengal Legislative Assembly election: Balagarh
Party	Candidate	Votes	%	±%
BJP	Sumana Sarkar	125,624	55.58	▲12.58
AITC	Ranjan Dhara	83,710	37.03	▼8.6
CPI(M)	Bikash Golder	10,175	4.5	▼4.49
NOTA	None of the above	1,347	0.6	▼0.81
Majority		41,914	18.55	▲15.92
Turnout		226,031	93.99	▲9.05
BJP gain from AITC		Swing		

=== 2021 ===
2021 West Bengal Legislative Assembly election: Balagarh
Party	Candidate	Votes	%	±%
AITC	Manoranjan Byapari	100,364	45.63	▼1.73
BJP	Subhash Chandra Halder	94,580	43.0	▲32.81
CPI(M)	Mahamaya Mondal	19,766	8.99	▼29.62
NOTA	None of the above	3,105	1.41	▼0.49
SUCI(C)	Sukdeb Biswas	2,142	0.97	New entry
Majority		5,784	2.63	▼6.12
Turnout		219,957	84.94	▼0.65
AITC hold		Swing		

=== 2016 ===
2016 West Bengal Legislative Assembly election: Balagarh
Party	Candidate	Votes	%	±%
AITC	Ashim Kumar Majhi	96,472	47.36	▼4.99
CPI(M)	Panchu Gopal Mondal	78,635	38.61	▼2.00
BJP	Subhash Chandra Halder	20,757	10.19	▲6.81
NOTA	None of the Above	3,875	1.9	New entry
CPI(ML)L	Gautam Mondal	1,718	0.84	▼0.52
Majority		17,837	8.75	▼2.99
Turnout		2,03,683	85.59	▼2.87
AITC hold		Swing		

=== 2011 ===
2011 West Bengal Legislative Assembly election: Balagarh
Party	Candidate	Votes	%	±%
AITC	Ashim Kumar Majhi	96,254	52.35	
CPI(M)	Bhuban Pramanick	74,671	40.61	
BJP	Bangshi Rauth	6,223	3.38	
Independent	Monoj Mistri	3,232	1.76	
CPI(ML)L	Gautam Mondal	2,493	1.36	
JDP	Sanjib Malik	994	0.54	
Majority		21,583	11.74	
Turnout		1,83,867	88.52	
AITC gain from CPI(M)		Swing		

=== 1977-2006 ===
The Balagarh seat fell vacant because of the death of the sitting MLA, Dibakanta Routh. In 2007 by-elections, Bhuban Pramanick of CPI(M) polled 60,101 votes to win the seat. Ashim Majhi of Trinamool Congress secured 51,691 votes, Bangshi Raut of the BJP secured 8,833 votes, Biswanath Malik of Indian National Congress secured 5,864 votes and Gautam Mandal of the CPI(ML) secured 4,530 votes.

Contests in most years were multi cornered but only winners and runners are being mentioned. Dibakanta Routh of CPI (M) won the Balagarh (SC) assembly seat in 2006, 2001 and 1996, defeating his nearest rivals, Asim Patra of Trinamool Congress, Lakshmi Parui of Trinamool Congress and Biswanath Malik of Congress, in the respective years. Abinash Pramanik of CPI (M) won the seat in 1991, 1987, 1982 and 1977 defeating his nearest rivals Biswanath Malik, Gopal Krishna Dhar, Nilmoni Mandal and Gauranga Halder, all of Congress, in the respective years.

=== 1952-1972 ===
Biren Sarkar of Congress won in 1972. Abinash Pramanik of CPI(M) won in 1971 and 1969. H.K.Das of Congress won in 1967. Brindaban Chattopdhyay of Congress won in 1962. Bejoy Krishna Modak of CPI won in 1957. In independent India's first election in 1951 the Balagarh seat was won by Brindaban Chattopdhyay of Congress.
