= Dwarka Nath Mitra =

Indian lawyer and judge

Dwarka Nath Mitra (1833 - 25 February 1874) was a famous lawyer and judge of the Calcutta High Court.

Dwarka Nath Mitra was born in 1833 in Hooghly district and educated at Hooghly College where he excelled in mathematics and English literature. He studied law at Presidency College and joined the bar at the Sadr Diwani Adalat in 1856. He was appointed a judge of the High Court in 1867 at the age of 34 after the death of Sambhunath Pandit, the first Indian judge of the Calcutta High Court. Lord Northbrook, Viceroy of India, described Dwarka Nath Mitra as one of the most brilliant men he had ever met and said if Mitra were "put ... in a trio with Gladstone and Lowe ... would not be the least clever of the three." He died at the age of 41 on 25 February 1874.
