= Manoranjan Byapari =

Indian writer and activist

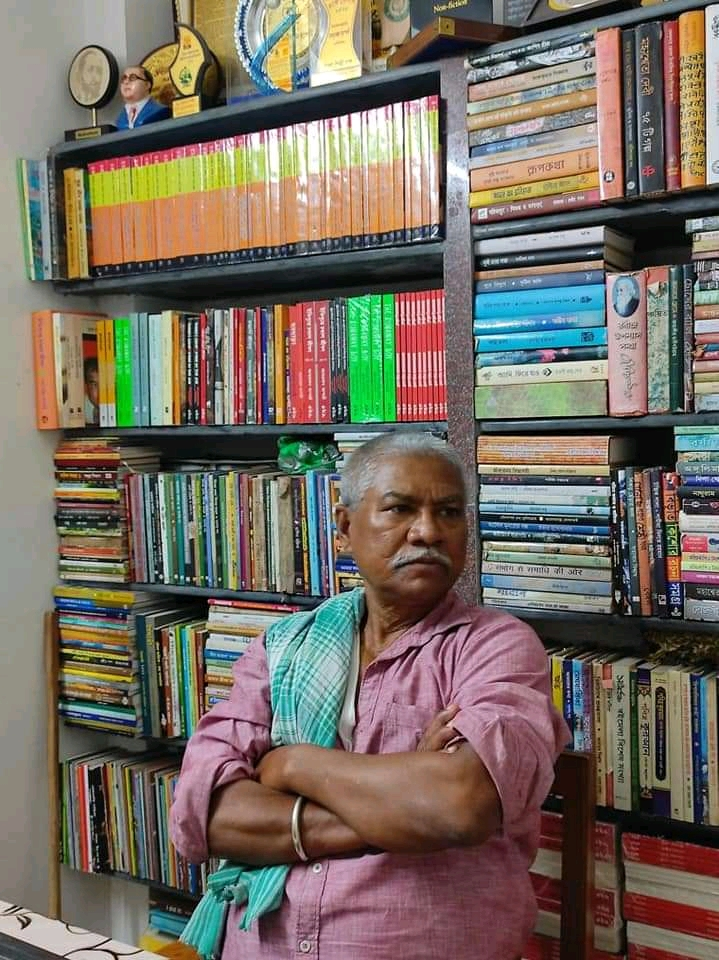

Member of the West Bengal Legislative Assembly
- In office 2 May 2021 – 4 May 2026
- Preceded by: Ashim Kumar Majhi
- Succeeded by: Sumana Sarkar
- Constituency: Balagarh

Chairperson of West Bengal Dalit Sahitya Academy
- Incumbent
- Assumed office 14 September 2020

Personal details
- Born: 1950 (age 75–76) Pirojpur, East Bengal, Dominion of Pakistan
- Party: Trinamool Congress
- Spouse: Anita Byapari
- Children: 2

Manoranjan Byapari (born 1950) is an Indian writer, socio-political activist, and a politician. He stands as one of the pioneering authors in the realm of Dalit literature in Bengali, hailing from the Indian state of West Bengal. Hindered by financial constraints, he was precluded from availing formal education, thereby distinguishing himself as a unique exemplar—a former convict turned rickshaw puller—having authored a substantial corpus comprising twelve novels, in addition to over a hundred short stories and non-fiction essays.

== Early life ==
Byapari was born into a Bengali Namasudra family in Turuk-Khali, Pirozpur, Barisal, East Bengal. His family relocated to West Bengal when he was three years old, initially settling in the Shiromanipur Refugee camp in Bankura. Subsequently, they were compelled to relocate to various locations, including Ghutiyari Sharif, Gholadoltala Refugee Camp in South 24 Paraganas, where they resided until 1969. However, at the age of fourteen, Byapari departed from his familial abode, engaging in a series of economically modest positions within the informal sector across diverse cities such as Assam, Lucknow, Delhi, and Allahabad. Following a two-year stint in Dandakaranya, he resettled in Kolkata in 1973. Notably, he briefly affiliated with the Naxals in central India. It was during his period of incarceration that he embarked on a self-directed educational pursuit, acquiring literacy. His close association with the labour activist Shankar Guha Niyogi is also noteworthy.

== Political career ==
He was elected as a MLA from Balagarh, representing the Trinamool Congress in the 2021 West Bengal Legislative Assembly election.

== Life as an author ==
He gained prominence following the publication of his influential essay titled "Is there a Dalit writing in Bangla?" which was translated by Meenakshi Mukherjee and featured in the Economic and Political Weekly. Concurrently employed as a rickshaw puller, he encountered Mahasweta Devi fortuitously, and she subsequently invited him to contribute to her journal, 'Bartika.' Within his scholarly contributions, he posits the contention that upper-caste refugees from East Bengal were accorded preferential treatment during their resettlement in Kolkata. Furthermore, a documentary chronicling his life has been produced by Rajya Sabha TV.

=== Books ===
He authored a memoir titled "ইতিবৃত্তে চণ্ডাল জীবন" in Bengali, which was subsequently translated into English by Sipra Mukherjee under the title Interrogating My Chandal Life: An Autobiography of a Dalit (Sage-Samya), and it received The Hindu Prize. This literary work documents the myriad experiences of oppression and marginalisation faced by Dalits in Bengal, a region often characterised as a 'casteless society' by the prevailing bhadralok narrative. His identity as a Dalit is integral to his literary expression, wherein he emphasises, "I’m a Dalit by birth. Only a Dalit, oppressed by social forces, can experience true dalan (oppression) in life. There should be that dalan as a Dalit in Dalit writing. Dalit literature should be grounded in Dalit life. Some of my writings delve into Dalit life, deserving impartial evaluation devoid of preconceived judgments." He articulates his dual identification as a chandal, both by birth and through a manifestation of indignation (krodha chandal).

== Awards ==
- Suprabha Majumdar prize awarded by Paschimbanga Bangla Akademi in 2014.
- Sharmila Ghosh Smriti Literary prize in 2015.
- The Hindu Literary Prize in non-fiction in 2019.
- Shakti Bhatt Prize in 2022.
- JCB Prize for Literature in 2023, his book The Nemesis was shortlisted for the JCB Prize for Literature.
