= Kasem Bin Abu Bakar =

Bangladeshi novelist

Kasem bin Abu Bakar
- Born: West Bengal, India
- Occupation: Novelist
- Notable work: Futanto Golap

Kasem bin Abu Bakar (also spelled Kasem bin Abubakar; Bengali: কাশেম বিন আবুবাকার) is an Indian-born Bangladeshi novelist. He is known for writing popular romantic fiction incorporating Islamic themes and moral values, often set in rural Bangladeshi society. His novel Futanto Golap (The Blossomed Rose) is regarded as his debut work. His writing attracted a substantial readership, particularly among women and readers in rural and conservative communities.

== Biography ==
Kasem bin Abu Bakar was born in West Bengal, India. He moved to Bangladesh in 1968, according to an interview published by Bangla Tribune. After arriving in Bangladesh, he began working at the Mallik Brothers bookshop in Dhaka's New Market. His experience working in a bookshop and observing its customers influenced his decision to begin writing.

== Literary career ==
Kasem began writing his first novel, Futanto Golap, in 1978. The manuscript reportedly remained unpublished for nearly a decade before it was eventually brought out. The novel tells a love story and incorporates Islamic values and themes. Its publication helped establish his readership, particularly among readers in rural and conservative communities.

In his interview with Bangla Tribune, Kasem said that he began writing after observing the behaviour of young people who visited the bookshop where he worked. He described his intention as presenting love and relationships through a moral and religious perspective. He also explained that he did not consider his novels to be strictly Islamic novels, but rather works of fiction that incorporated Islamic ideas.

According to the same interview, 100 books by him were published between 1986 and 2015, including 85 novels. He said that he had stopped writing because of his age, although readers continued to ask him to write.

== Reception and criticism ==
Kasem's novels gained popularity among readers outside the mainstream literary readership in Bangladesh. A report by Agence France-Presse described his books as commercially successful, particularly among young women in rural and conservative areas. The report noted that his romantic stories combined love narratives with religious and moral themes.

His popularity also attracted criticism. In a report published in April 2017, BBC Bengali discussed differing opinions about the literary quality and religious content of his novels. Some readers and commentators questioned the literary merit of his writing, while others acknowledged his popularity among a large readership. The report also quoted Kasem explaining that he believed the incorporation of Islamic values into his stories was a major reason for their appeal.

His work and the debate surrounding its popularity were also discussed in Bangladeshi media.

== International media coverage ==
In April 2017, Kasem attracted international media attention after Agence France-Presse published a feature about his novels and their readership in Bangladesh. The report was republished by several international news outlets, including Dawn and Arab News. These reports described the popularity of his fiction and its appeal to readers in rural and conservative communities.

The international coverage brought renewed attention to Kasem and his novels in Bangladesh. His writing became the subject of discussion in local and international media, including debates about popular literature, religious themes and the distinction between mainstream literary recognition and commercial readership.
