= Hooghly Collegiate School =

Coordinates: 22.8821°N 88.3992°E

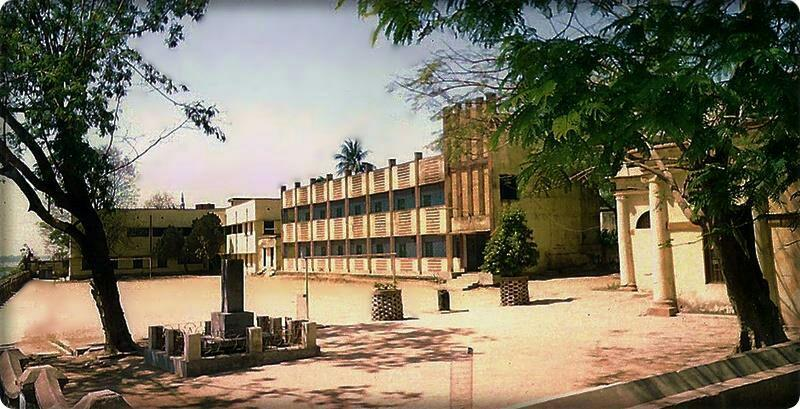
- Hooghly Collegiate School in early 2000s

Location
- Chinsurah-712101; State-West Bengal, India

Information
- Type: Government School (directly, Government of West Bengal)
- Established: 1812; 213 years ago
- Campus: Urban
- Affiliation: WBBSE & WBCHSE

Hooghly Collegiate School was founded in 1812 as the Hooghly College and is one of the oldest schools in India and the 2nd oldest in West Bengal, the oldest one being St Thomas School, Kolkata.

== History ==
HCS's early provenance is sketchily documented in Karuņāsāgar Vidyāsāgar, quoting from 'Education Committee' reports, periodicals and other print media of that period. The name of the school changed once or twice, till it came to be known as 'Hooghly College' and thence 'Hooghly Collegiate School' when the college wing was created. The location underwent changes, too. The so-called 'new building' (to the 'Ṣāṇḍeśvar Talā' end of the prayer ground, to house the laboratories and the classes IX to XI of the new Higher Secondary scheme) and the box-like, stand-alone crafts-cum-smithy building were completed in 1956–57. The oldest building of the school and part of the adjoining Mohsin College were Hazi Mohammad Mohsin's personal property.

== Notable alumni ==
- Bankimchandra Chattopadhyay (1838–1894)
- Dwarka Nath Mitra (1833–1874)
- Ramesh Chandra Majumdar (1888–1980)
- Brahmabandhab Upadhyay (1861–1907) (admitted into Hooghly Collegiate School in 1874)
- Pratul Mukhopadhyay(1950s)
- Shamsuddin Ahmed (1889–1969)

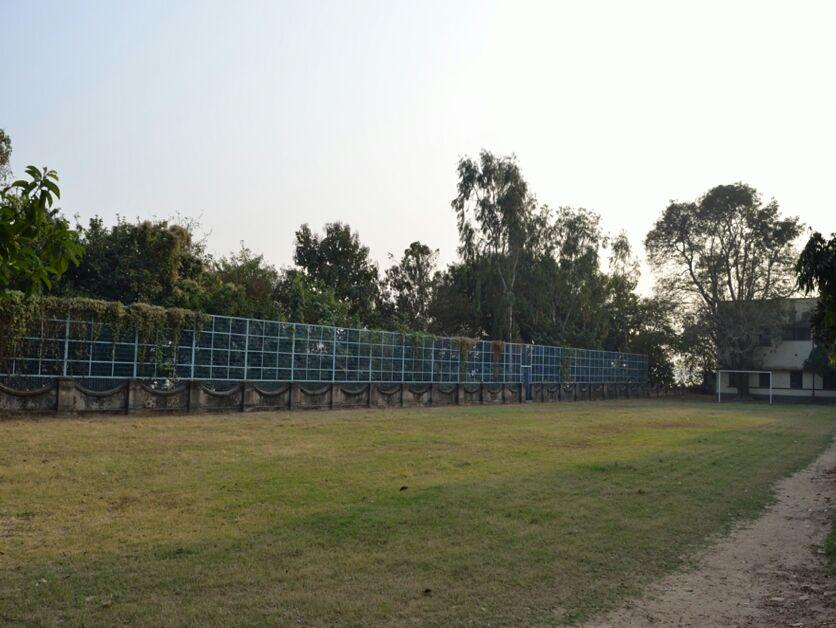
Playground in Hooghly Collegiate School

== In popular culture ==
In author Suman Sen's 2017 horror-comedy book Koto Bhoot! Ki Adbhut!, the main protagonist Batuk babu was an alumnus of this school.
