= Kirity Roy =

Indian civil rights activist

- Occupation: Civil rights activist

Kirity Roy is an Indian civil rights activist working in West Bengal. He is the founder secretary of Manabadhikar Suraksha Mancha (MASUM) of a non-governmental human rights organisation based in Serampore, Hoogly, near Kolkata. he has been documenting alleged state atrocities, particularly in Indo-Bangladesh bordering districts of West Bengal. In 2003, Roy was elected to the board of Amnesty International India.

Roy is known for fighting against alleged state atrocities, where victims —often among India's poorest citizens— report extrajudicial killings, custodial death, rape, mysterious disappearances, and police torture. Roy documented 118 cases in 2006, 469 in 2007, 210 in 2008.

In June 2008, the West Bengal police filed several cases against Roy after he had organized a ‘People’s Tribunal on Torture’ documenting several instances of police torture.

== Arrest ==
He was arrested at Darang, Assam, along with Mr. Ravi Nair (SAHRDC), Mr. P. A. Sebastian (CPDR), Mr. Parag Das (MASS) and others on 10 December 1993, from a public meeting conveyed to celebrate Human Rights Day. On 9 December 2005, on the eve of Human Rights Day, Kirity Roy along with other activists of MASUM was arrested in front of Writers’ Buildings (State Secretariat), Kolkata. In 1994, his residence was attacked and bombed by the police for standing as a witness in a Habeas Corpus case relating to the abduction and murder of Bhikari Paswan, a jute mill worker, by the police.

In April 2010, Roy was arrested on allegations of "impersonation" related to the same incident - the charges behind his arrest imply that conducting public hearings constitutes "running a parallel court". The arrest was condemned by Amnesty International, the Asian Centre for Human Rights, and International Federation of Human Rights.

Kirity Roy is an Indian civil rights activist working in West Bengal. As secretary of a non-governmental human rights organisation based in Kolkata, Banglar Manabadhikar Suraksha Mancha (MASUM),[1], he has been documenting alleged state atrocities upon the people from marginalized sections of West Bengal. In 2003, Roy was elected to the board of Amnesty International India.

Roy is known for fighting against alleged state atrocities, where victims —often among India's poorest citizens— report extrajudicial killings, custodial death, rape, mysterious disappearances, and police torture. Roy documented 118 cases in 2006, 469 in 2007, 210 in 2008[2].

At present, he is the National Convener of the Programme Against Custodial Torture and Impunity (PACTI) of India and is the Secretary of MASUM; the convening organization of South-Asian Network against Torture and Impunity (SANTI). Both the networks are working on custodial torture and Impunity.

He attended session at UN Human Rights Council as a representative of Indian NGOs on UPR system in 2008 at Geneva. His work was applauded by Amnesty International on its 50th anniversary year. His opinion on custodial torture; extra judicial killings, capital punishment and faulty criminal justice system get published in various international media of repute and appreciated his daring efforts to minimize violent subjugation of marginalized sections by bordering guards of India and release of Bangladeshi and Indian prisoners; completed their sentences in jails.

World Organisation Against Torture (OMCT) selected Mr. Roy out of ten activists of the world during the auspices of international human rights day; 2012 and published his version.

In June 2008, the West Bengal police filed several cases against Roy after he had organized a ‘People’s Tribunal on Torture’ documenting several instances of police torture।

== See also ==
- Asian Forum for Human Rights and Development
