= Outline of public affairs =

Overview of and topical guide to public affairs

The following outline is provided as an overview of and topical guide to public affairs:

Public affairs - catch-all term that includes public policy as well as public administration, both of which are closely related to and draw upon the fields of political science and economics.

== Essence of public affairs ==
- Public – in public relations and communication science, the contexts of "public" are:
  - Publics – groups of individuals
  - The public (a.k.a."the general public") – the totality of such groups.
- Affairs – professional, personal, or public business matters.

== Branches of public affairs ==
- Public policy – principled guide to action taken by the administrative or executive branches of the state with regard to a class of issues in a manner consistent with law and institutional customs. Public policy is commonly embodied "in constitutions, legislative acts, and judicial decisions."
- Public administration – implementation of government policy and an academic discipline that studies this implementation and that prepares civil servants for this work.

== General public affairs concepts ==
- State (polity), Sovereign state, government
  - Democracy
  - Monarchy
  - Republic
- Security
  - Crime, Criminal justice
  - Civil defense, Emergency preparedness, Community emergency response teams
  - Military
- Regulation, Deregulation
  - Industrial policy, Investment policy, Tax, tariff and trade
  - Public health, Pollution, Emissions trading
- Budget
  - Socialism
  - Taxation
  - Technocracy
- Management
- Public policy degrees
