= Thomas E. Weber =

Thomas E. Weber is an American journalist who writes about technology for The Daily Beast. He was previously an editor at The Wall Street Journal, where he launched and edited the Weekend Edition's Pursuits section (later renamed Weekend Journal), and later the Editor of Smartmoney.com until 2010.

He is a graduate of Princeton University and President of the Board of Trustees of The Daily Princetonian. Princeton appointed him a Ferris Professor of Journalism for 2010. As a reporter at The Wall Street Journal in 1996, Weber was named one of the top journalists under age 30 by TJFR, an industry newsletter.
