= Serampore Rajbari =

Heritage mansion in Serampore, India

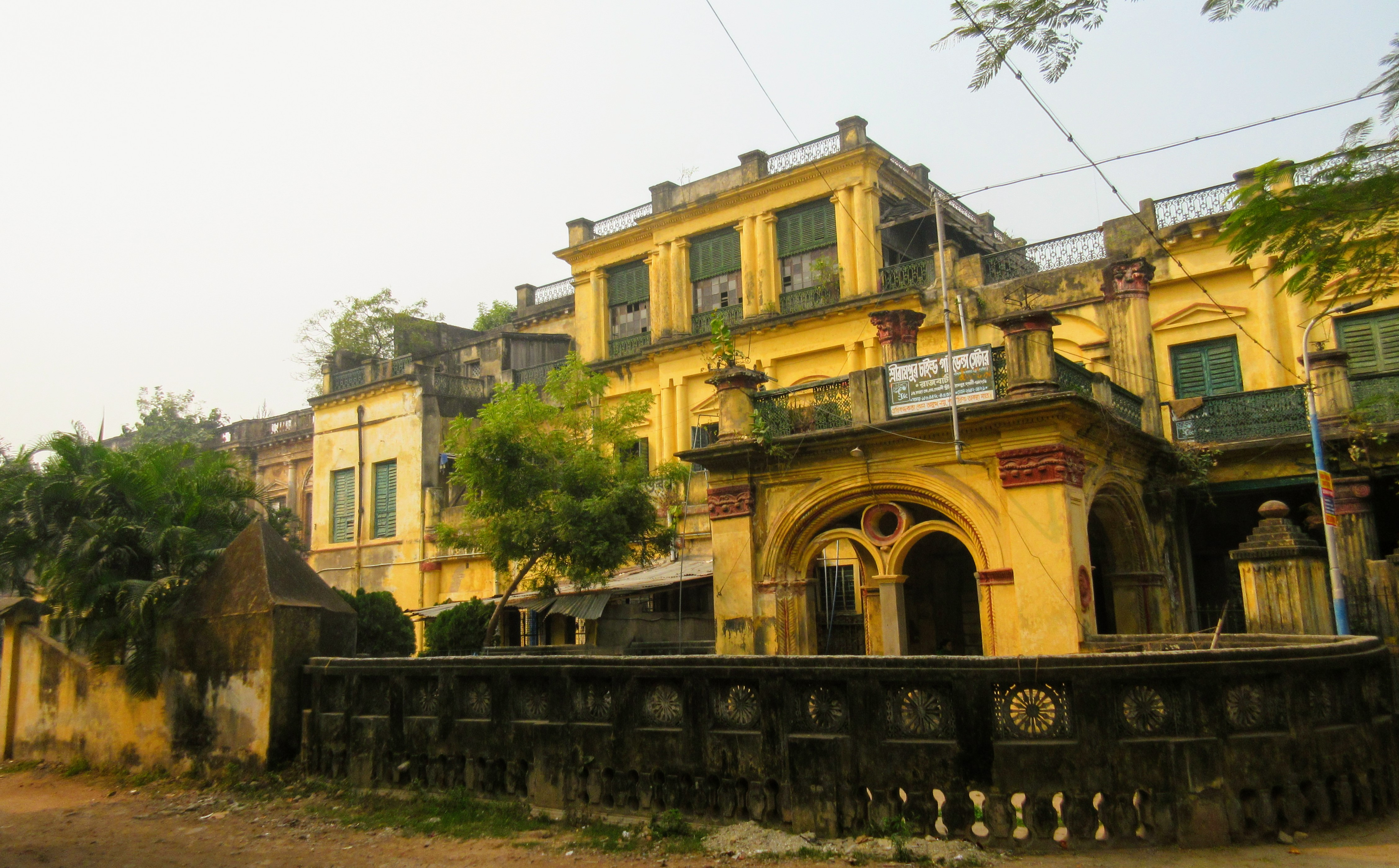
- The facade on the northern section of the mansion
- Alternative names: Goswami Rajbari

General information
- Type: Palace
- Architectural style: Neoclassical architecture and Bengali architecture
- Location: Serampore, Hooghly district, West Bengal, India
- Coordinates: 22°45′32.3″N 88°20′25.5″E
- Owner: Goswami family

Design and construction
- Designations: Heritage building

Serampore Rajbari, also known as Goswami Rajbari, is a heritage mansion located in Serampore, in the Hooghly district of West Bengal, India. It was made by Raghuram Goswami in the 19th century. It is a two-storeyed mansion that has been made in a combination of Bengali and Neoclassical architectural styles. The complex consists of a central courtyard, a five-arched Durga dalan and a nata mandir, which is known as the Chandni.

The complex also has separate temples dedicated to the family's deities — Radhamadhav Jiu, Gopal Jiu and Radharani. The Serampore Rajbari is also known for the Goswami family's 340 years old traditional Durga Puja. The bonedi bari style ek-chaala idol of the goddess is worshipped here. The Heritage Commission of the West Bengal State Government declared the mansion a heritage building in 2008.

== History ==
The Goswami family of the Serampore Rajbari traces its ancestry to one of the five Kanyakubja Brahmin families from Kannauj whom King Adisur had invited to settle in Bengal to revive traditional orthodox Brahminical Hinduism. In exchange, he promised them land and monies. Those five families with the surnames Mukherjee, Banerjee, Chatterjee, Ganguly and Bhattacharjee became the Kulin Brahmins of Bengal. Pandit Lakshman Bhattacharya was one of the earliest notable descendants of the Bhattacharyas. He used to live at Patuli in Burdwan, where he used to teach at a toll. He had married Chaitanya Mahaprabhu's ardent follower Adwaitacharya Goswami's son Achyutananda Mishra Goswami's daughter's descendant.

Pandit Lakshman Bhattacharya's son, Ramgobinda Goswami, founded the Serampore Goswami family. Ramgobinda had spent his childhood in his maternal home. He took up his mother's surname after getting influenced by his maternal ancestors' role in the Gaudiya Vaishnavism. He became highly knowledgeable about the Vaishnava literature. Subsequently, he got converted from his original Shakta denomination to the Vaishnava denomination and took up the title of Gosain (English → Goswami).

In the 1750s, on an occasion, Ramgobinda Goswami was travelling for Calcutta from Patuli via the Ganges. His wife, Manoroma Devi, suddenly went into labour. Hence, they made an immediate halt at Chatra in Serampore. After hearing the news that Ramgobinda Goswami's son was born in his kingdom, Manohar Roy, the king of Sheoraphuli Raj Debuttar Estate, arranged for their stay. He also wished to give Ramgobinda some land. However, as a Brahmin, Ramgobinda could not accept land as a gift from a non-Brahmin. He therefore acquired it in exchange for a single cowrie shell. Later, he built a small aatchala house on that land, which served as his residence. He began the Durga puja of the family in that house. Ramgobinda had two sons — Ramgopal Goswami and Radhakanta Goswami. Radhakanta Goswami's youngest son was Harinarayan Goswami. Harinarayan Goswami's eldest son was Raghuram Goswami.

Raghuram moved out from their ancestral house made by Ramgobinda Goswami due to the excessive fragmentation of the property. He wanted to build a separate property for his family and hence, he constructed the Serampore Rajbari. Initially he built a small house that is now known as the "Puratan Bati". A few years later, he built the current mansion, at some distance from the "Puratan Bati". The ancestral Durga puja was continued by Raghuram Goswami inside the newly constructed mansion.

Raghuram earned a huge fortune owing to his associations with the British merchant John Palmer. He worked as an agent at Palmer's firm — John Palmer & Co. He brought numerous properties in different districts of the Bengal Presidency as well as Calcutta. When the Danes left Serampore in 1845, Raghuram Goswami offered to purchase all their properties in Serampore for ₹11 lakh. But they finally sold their factories and properties to the more influential East India Company for ₹12 lakh. Some reports mention that, later, Raghuram had agreed to give ₹12 lakh, but his bid was disallowed by the ruling British government.

=== Eminent visitors ===
The Serampore Rajbari has been visited by various eminent people from various fields in life — including Mahatma Gandhi, Bidhan Chandra Roy, Subhash Chandra Bose and Chittaranjan Das. The house has also been visited by multiple actors from the Bengali film industry, including Satyajit Ray, Uttam Kumar and Supriya Devi.

Mahatma Gandhi came here to participate in a conference of the Triveni Sangh. Bidhan Chandra Roy came here to discuss developmental policies with Balaichand Goswami, a member of the Goswami household and the then Chairman of the Serampore Municipality. Subhash Chandra Bose and Chittaranjan Das visited this house for their closeness with Tulsi Chandra Goswami, a member of this household and the Finance Minister in the third cabinet of the Bengal Presidency.

== Architecture and layout ==
The Durga dalan and Nata mandir

The Serampore Rajbari is a two-storeyed mansion made in a combination of Bengali architecture and Neoclassical architecture. The main building has more than 100 rooms, while the extended property consists of around 400 rooms, which are used by the extended Goswami family. The double arched entrance on the southern part leads to the 120×30 feet central courtyard, which is flanked by 30 feet tall fluted columns. These columns extend from the ground floor to the first floor. The first floor has a balcony on the side opposite to the Durga dalan and rooms with stained glass windows on the two other opposite-facing sides.

The façade of the northern part of the complex of the mansion depicts various classical architectural styles, including Italianate architecture and Corinthian architecture, where the latter is depicted by fluted columns and rich ornamental capitals. The interiors are adorned with layered mouldings and stucco art. There's a family memorial museum on the first floor. It consists of easel paintings of some of the family ancestors. In the southern complex, the front façade is made with neoclassical architecture — half-columns in Tuscan style on the ground floor and half-columns in Ionic style on the first floor.

Southern part of the mansion

Presently, the mansion is made of two separate blocks. Initially, those two blocks were connected by a network of staircases. But later, due to the division of property, the passages were demolished and walls were constructed to separate the two sections. The five-arched Durga dalan is flanked by corridors and adjoining rooms on two lateral sides. The Rajbari premises also includes a Nata mandir which is named "Chandni". It has 24 fluted Corinthian columns — each 32 feet high and 5 feet in diameter. Its floors are covered in Chunar stone. The wooden framework supporting the roof is made from Sal wood imported from Nepal. The hall was used during special occasions like Durga Puja and Dolyatra.

== Family deities ==
The king of Bishnupur had appointed Raghuram Goswami as a priest for worshipping the family deities of the Bishnupur royal family. He was primarily responsible for worshipping the Hindu deities of Radhamadhav Jiu and Gopal Jiu. Hereditarily, the priesthood passed on to one of Raghuram's five children - Gopikrishna Goswami. Around 1778, the next king of Bishnupur transferred the ownership of the deities to Gopikrishna. Subsequently, he brought the deities of Radhamadhav Jiu and Gopal Jiu to the Serampore Rajbari. Besides those two deities, the king also entrusted him with the responsibility of an ashtadhatu idol of Radharani. Then onwards, the three deities were kept in separate temples in the northern part of the Goswami Rajbari complex.

== Durga puja ==
The ek-chaala Durga Puja of the Goswami family, which is more than 340 years old and is a part of West Bengal's traditional bonedi barir puja heritage

The Durga puja of the Goswami Rajbari is over 340 years old. Anthony Firingee, Bhola Moira and Roopchand Pakshi's music group were among the various kabiyals who used to come here during the Durga Puja to sing devotional hymns.

The puja is conducted as per the Vaishnav rituals and practices mentioned in other religious scriptures, including the Devi Purana, Kalika Purana and Brihat Nadikeshar Puran. The kathamo puja (structure worship) is conducted on the day of Rathyatra. After some days, the process of making the traditional ek-chaala (single frame) idol begins. The daaker saaj (background decoration) of the idols is brought from Purbasthali in the Purba Bardhaman district.

The deities are dressed in sholapith and adorned with silver-foil ornaments, including spirally coiled metallic wires (salma) and flat reflective metallic sequins (chumki). The goddess's weapons are made of tin and covered in silver foil. The Chalchitra is also shaped like a bamboo kulo. Its painted figures appear in clockwise order: Jaya; five of the Dashavatara (Matsya, Kurma, Varaha, Narasimha and Vamana); Chamunda slaying the demons Chanda and Munda; Shiva; Durga, accompanied by Chamunda, slaying the demon Raktabīja; the remaining five avatars of Vishnu (Parashurama, Rama, Krishna, Buddha and Kalki); and Vijaya.

=== Rituals ===
The Akalabodhana ritual is observed on the day of Sasthi. It is conducted in a room adjacent to the Durga dalan. The ghot of akalbodhana is placed next to the Durga idol. The puja begins on the Saptami morning with the ghatamalya ritual of Saptami. The eldest women of the Goswami family welcome the goddess by putting a garland around the main ghot. After the ghatamalya ritual, women and some men of the household are barred from entering the platform where the deity is placed until the Baran rituals on Dashami. Then, the Nabapatrika snan ritual is performed in the Durga dalan. After the Nabapatrika is placed beside Durga, the deity of Dhanalakshmi is also placed besides Durga and is worshipped throughout the remaining days of the festival.

From Saptami to Navami, the Dashavatars of Vishnu are also worshipped. Saptami is marked by the additional worship of Chandi. Ashtami is marked by the additional worship of Dakshina Kali and Navami is marked by the additional worship of the 64 yoginis. During Sandhi Puja on Ashtami, the kulo pradeep is lit. It consists of 108 brass lamps arranged in the shape of a bamboo kulo to form a single lamp, which is placed on a banana leaf. Kumari Puja is practiced on the day of Navami.

The food that's offered to the deity is referred to as the annabhog. It consists of rice, khichuri, dal, five varieties of fried vegetables, two vegetable curries, chutney, payesh and sweets. In the past, a special variety of payesh was prepared using rice fried in ghee and sweetened with mishri (rock sugar) and batasha (sweet pellets). Naivedya is offered, which comprises whole fruits. Raw vegetables like a winter melon, a sugarcane and a cucumber are also offered.

On Dashami, the family women consume ilish before performing the Baran rituals. They also eat paan without paan masala. Instead, the betel leaves are flavoured with cardamom, fennel seeds and sweets such as sandesh. The goddess is offered the Jharkhili paan, in which several small portions of paan are made from a single betel leaf. One Jharkhili paan is placed in the palm of each deity, including Mahishasura. It is followed by the Kanakanjali and Dhunuchi naach rituals. For immersion, the idols are carried to the Ganga at Serampore Rajbari Ghat. In the past, the idols were immersed midstream with the help of two boats. However, the practice was discontinued following a cyclone that occurred during the Durga Puja idol immersion in a particular year.

== Restoration ==
Shibasish Goswami began to attempt to preserve this building and the associated ancestral heritage in 2010, after he saw an image of Subhash Chandra Bose, Jawaharlal Nehru and Chittaranjan Das with one of his ancestors, Tulsi Chandra Goswami, at Motilal Nehru's residence, Ananda Bhavan, in Prayagraj.

=== Tourism ===
The Serampore Rajbari provides Durga puja tours in association with heritage travel companies. From 2022 onwards, the bhog of Ashtami is served to visitors for ₹300 per head. The Serampore Rajbari is also a popular location for pre-wedding shoots.

In 2022, it was among the 56 rajbaris that were identified by the West Bengal Government in the first phase as a part of their targeted list of 100 rajbaris, which they had planned to identify in order to preserve the heritage as well as promote "rajbari tourism" in West Bengal as a part of the state government's tourism department's "Experience Bengal" initiative.

== Filmmaking venue ==
Satyajit Ray came here to recce the rajbari as the filming location for his upcoming film Ghare Baire. As soon as the news of his arrival spread among the villagers, massive crowds gathered outside the rajbari to see him. Due to the excessive crowd pressure, he cancelled the rajbari as a potential filming location. Multiple films have been shot here, including the Anik Dutta directorial Bengali film Bhooter Bhabishyat (2013).

== Nearby historical landmarks ==
Serampore has a rich history of colonial–era and post–independence landmarks. Historical landmarks in and around Serampore Rajbari include the 1806 built St. Olav's Church, Serampore, the Anthropological Survey of India maintained Serampore Danish Cemetery, the Henry Martyn Pagoda, the Serampore College, the Danish Governor's House, the Serampore Catholic Church, the Denmark Tavern, the Serampore Johnnagar Baptist Church, the Radhaballav Temple, the Madan Mohan temple, the Mahesh Jagannath temple and the Dol Mandir.
