= Girindra Kumar Dutta =

Bengali illustrator, cartoonist, caricaturist

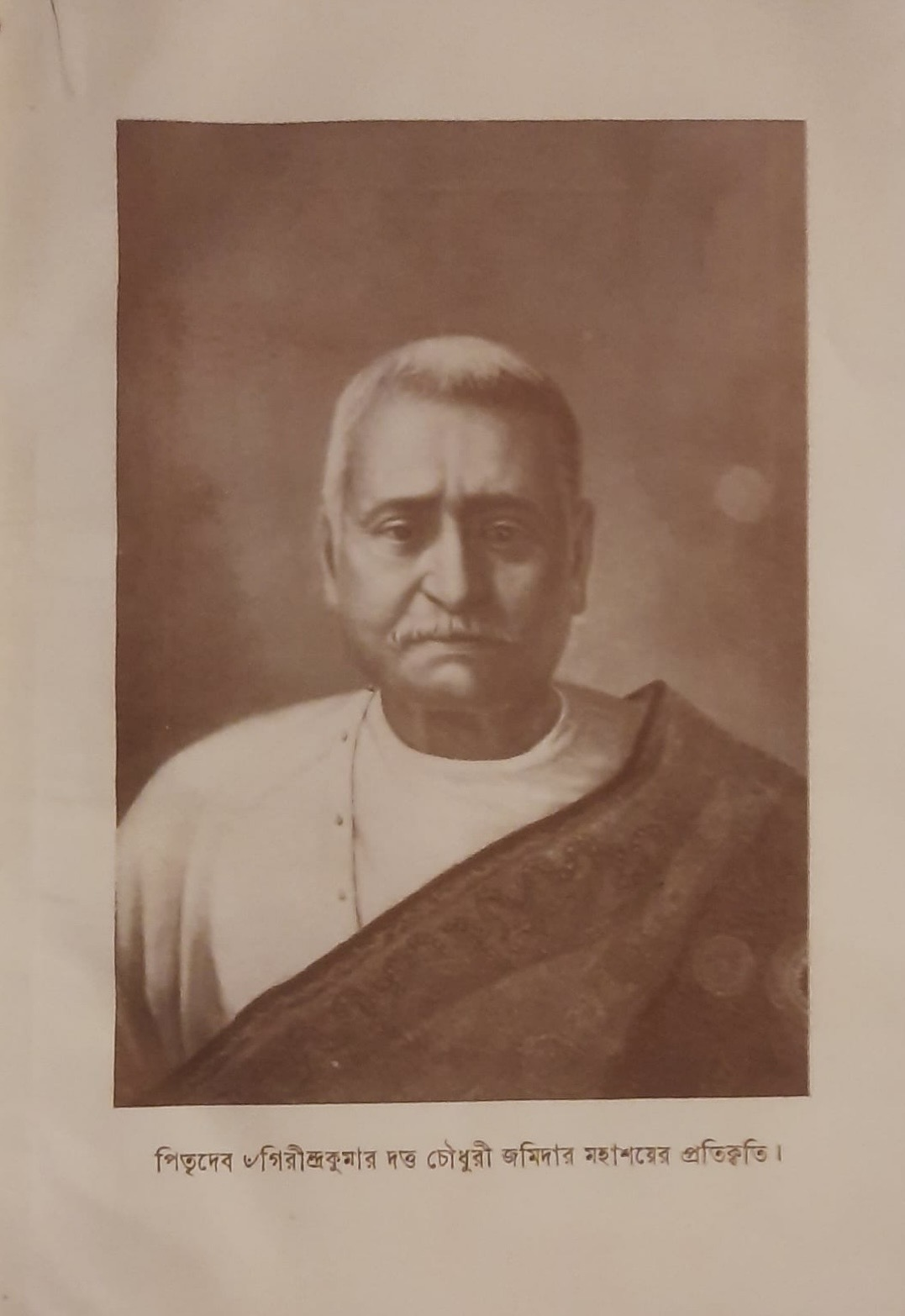
Girindra Kumar Dutta Chowdhury, reproduced by his son Radhanath Dutta in his Bibaha Rahasya (1936)

Girindra Kumar Dutta Chowdhury (1841–1909) was a professional illustrator and lithographer of the Hatkhola Dutta family of Calcutta. He was the third son of Rajendra Dutta Chowdhury. Radhanath Dutta, the author of Bibaho Rahasya (1936) was Girindra Kumar's son.

== Cartoonist of Basantak (1874–76) ==
Girindra Kumar Dutta was an oil painter and watercolorist. His works, Madhavmohini, Chandrarohini, and Hiralal were published under the pseudonym Gajapati Ray. Dutta emerged on the colonial artistic scene with his illustrations for Tekchand Thakur's famous satire, Alaler Gharer Dulal (2nd edition, 1870). He also illustrated the multi-panelled sequential cartoons and caricatures in the satirical Bengali magazine, Basantak (1874–76), edited by Prannath Dutta, his distant relative. Prananath Dutta's printing press, where Basantak was printed, was located at Garanhata, Calcutta, in the heart of the colonial book and picture-trading area known as Battala. Basantak's illustrator was registered as Girindra Kumar Dutta of Nimtala (the place of Dutta and Prananath's ancestral home).

Basantak was modeled on the English illustrated satirical magazine London Punch, with a wide range of caricatures directed against the British Raj and the squabbles within Indian gentry politics. The illustrated farces in Basantak borrowed characters, themes, settings, visual dramatization, and rhetorical structures from three sources. It borrowed slapstick humor from folk performances, dramatic qualities and rhetorical devices from Sanskrit plays, and the medium of illustrated journalism or satirical imagetexts from Sketches by Boz, written by Charles Dickens and illustrated by George Cruikshank.

Basantak belongs to the tradition of nineteenth-century Battala printed books and, therefore, shares Battala literature's stance regarding the New Woman, babus and their babudom, alcoholism, sex work, apostasy, and the Brits. Basantak belongs to the literary traditions of urban vernacular print, orature, and folk dramatic performances in colonial Bengal.

Bengali comics scholars and enthusiasts have unanimously identified the first sequential narrative art in colonial Bengal, resembling twentieth-century medium of comics, in the last issue of Basantak.
