= Chatra, Serampore =

Neighbourhood in Hooghly, India

Chatra
- Neighbourhood
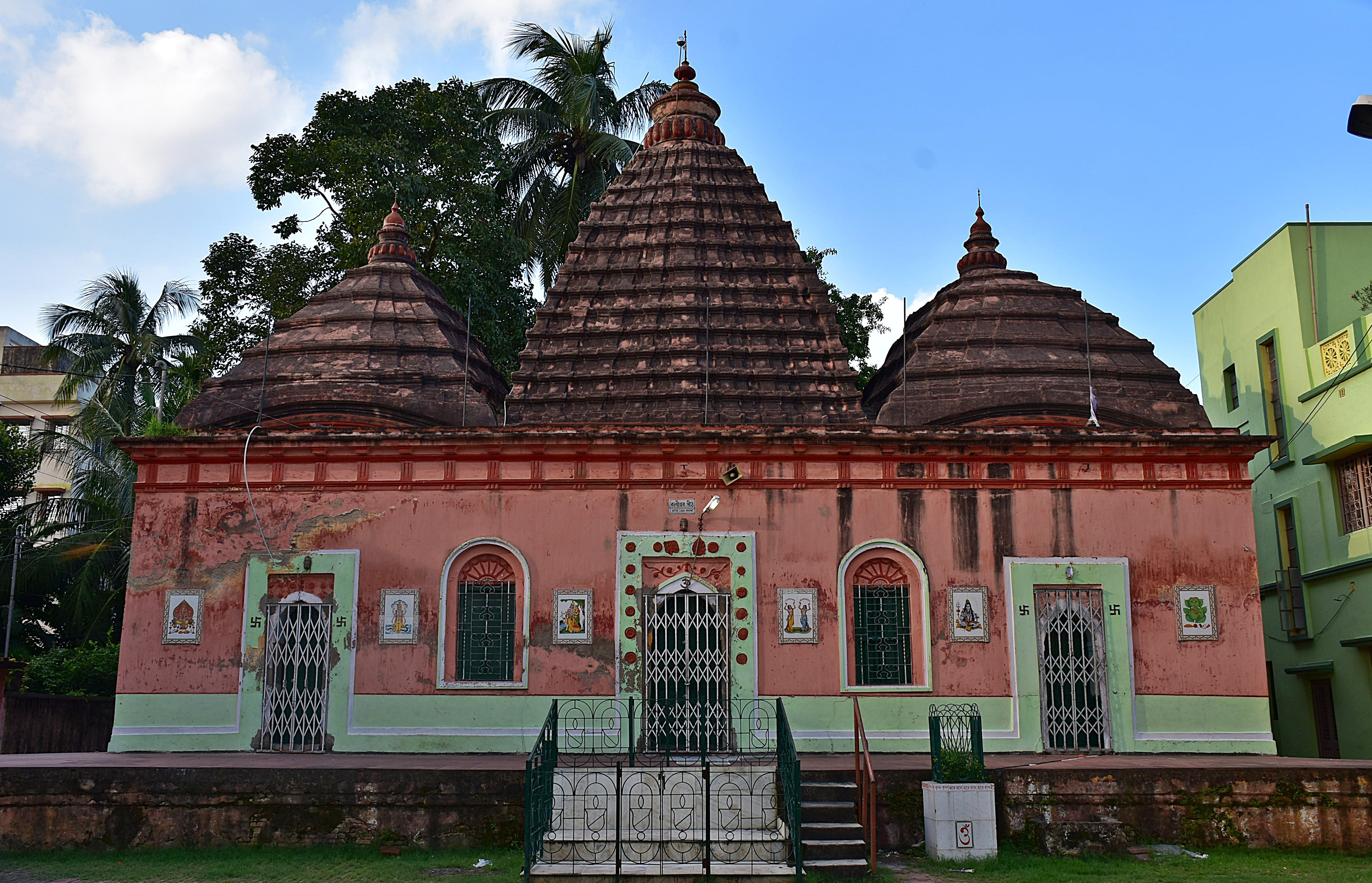
- Kashishwar pith at Chatra, established in 1522; Sri Chaitanya Mahaprabhu came here.

- Location in West Bengal, India Chatra (India)
- Coordinates: 22°45′33.35″N 88°19′53.40″E
- Country: India
- State: West Bengal
- District: Hooghly
- City: Serampore
- Ward: Serampore Municipality: 1, 2, 3, 4 & 5 and Baidyabati Municipality: 4
- Parliamentary constituency: Srerampur
- Assembly constituency: Sreerampur and Champdani

Government
  - MLA: Dr. Sudipto Roy & Arindam Guin
  - Municipal Chair Person: Giridhari Saha and Pintu Mahato
  - MP: Sri. Kalyan Banerjee
- Time zone: UTC+5:30 (IST)
- PIN: 712204
- Area code: 0332 XXX XXXX

Chatra is a neighbourhood in Serampore of Hooghly district in the Indian state of West Bengal. It is a part of the area covered by Kolkata Metropolitan Development Authority (KMDA).

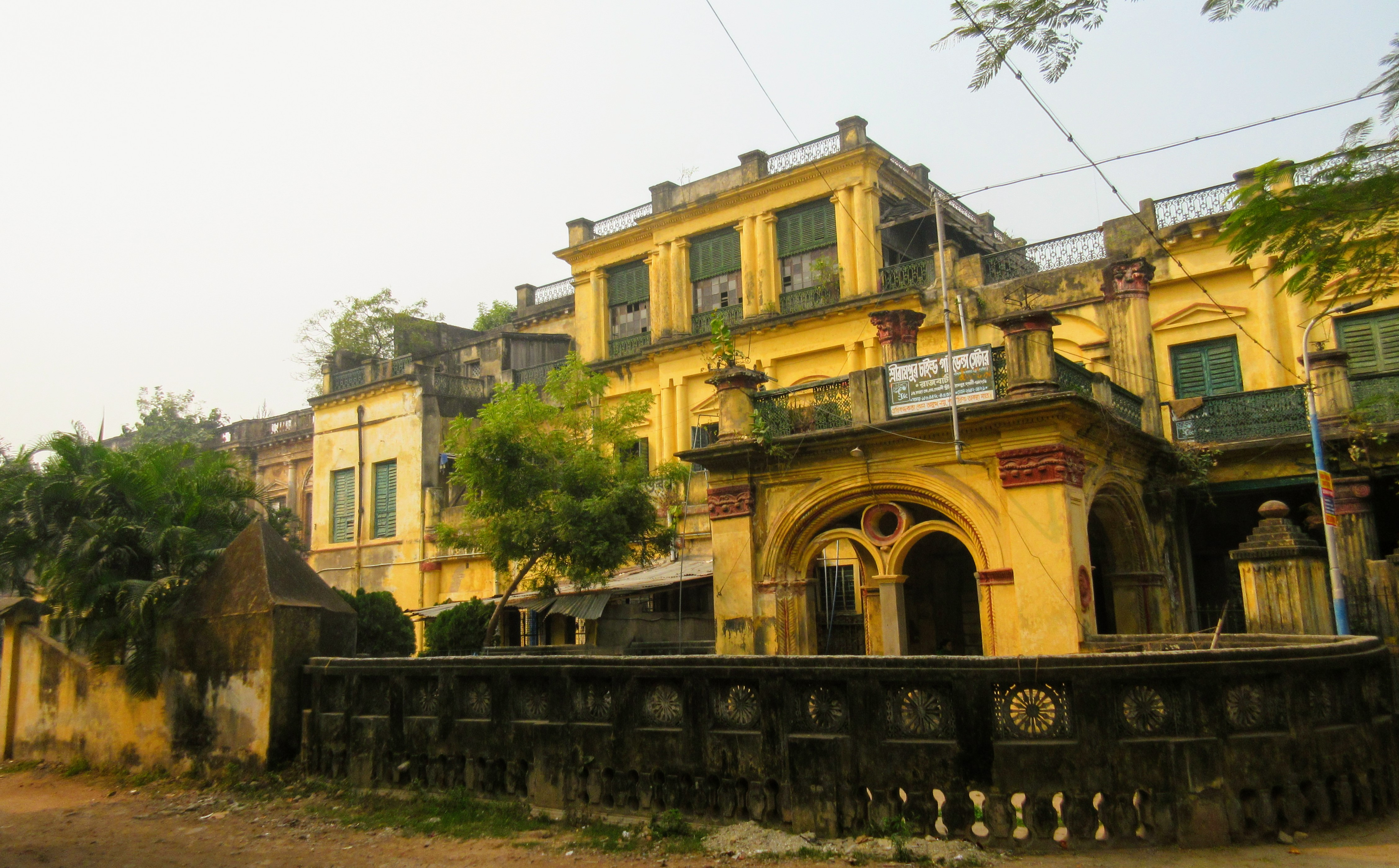
Serampore Rajbari, Chatra

== See also ==
- Serampore City
- Tin Bazar
- Battala
- Mahesh
- Dakshin Rajyadharpur
- Sheoraphuli
