= Serampore Municipality =

Municipal Corporation in West Bengal, India

Coordinates: 22.75121°N 88.34064°E

Type
- Type: Municipality

History
- Founded: 1865; 161 years ago

Leadership
- Chairman: Giridhari Saha, AITC
- Vice Chairman: Uttam Nag, AITC

Structure
- Seats: 29
- Political groups: Government (25): AITC (25); Opposition (2): CPI(M) (1); INC (1); Others (2): IND (2)

Elections
- Last election: 2022
- Next election: 2027

Website
- www.seramporemunicipality.net

Serampore Municipality is the civic body that governs Serampore and its surrounding areas (Mahesh, Tin Bazar, Battala and partly Chatra) in Srirampore subdivision of Hooghly district, West Bengal, India.

== History ==
Serampore is the first town in Bengal to voluntarily adopt the Municipal Act of 1850 Sec XX16. It is not clear when Serampore Municipality was established.

Serampore is a pre-colonial town on the west bank of the Hooghly. It was part of Danish India, when it was called Fredericksnagore, from 1755 to 1845.

== Geography ==
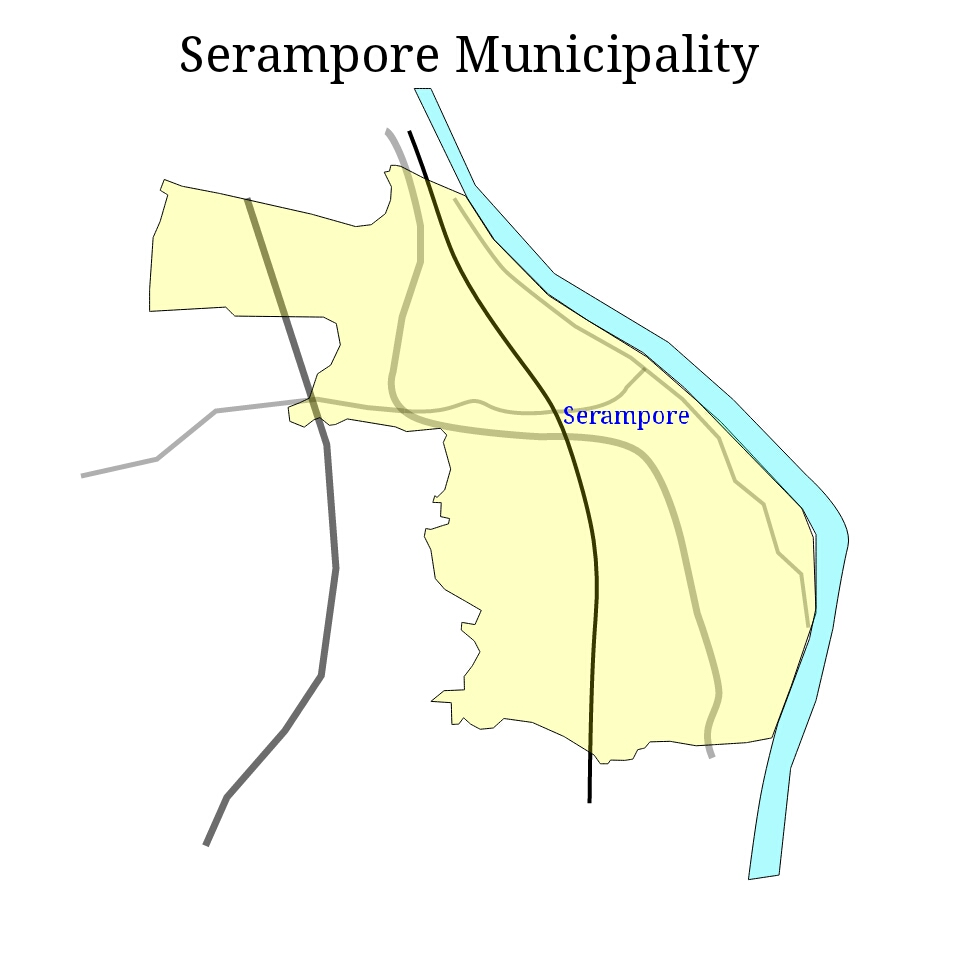
Map of Serampore Municipality

Serampore Municipality covers an area of 17.60 km^{2} and has a total population of 183,339 (2011).

In 1981, 29.44% of the total population formed main workers and 70.56% were non-workers in Serampore Municipality and 54.25% of the total main workers were industrial workers. This may be interpreted as follows: although industrial activities are prominent in the municipal areas of the region, the major portion of the population is commuters and migrants find employment in the area.

== Healthcare ==
Serampore Walsh Super Speciaity (Subdivisional) Hospital, with 266 beds, Serampore TB Hospital, with 55 beds, Serampore ESI Hospital, with 216 beds, are located in the Serampore Municipality area.

== Elections ==
In the 2015 municipal elections for Serampore Municipality Trinamool Congress won 22 seats, CPI(M) 4 seats, Congress 1 seat and Independents 2 seats.

In the 2010 municipal elections for Serampore Municipality Trinamool Congress won 13 seats, Congress 5 seats, CPI (M) 6 seats and Independents 5 seats.

About the 2010 municipal elections, The Guardian wrote, "Today's municipal elections are unlike any for decades: the Communists, who have held West Bengal's main towns almost without a break since the 1970s, are facing disaster… This time defeat is likely to be definitive and could signal the beginning of the end for the Communist Party of India-Marxist (CPIM)."

In the 2005 municipal elections for Serampore Municipality, Congress won 14 seats, CPI (M) 4 seats, CPI 2 seats, Trinamool Congress 4 seats and others 1 seat.
