= Mahesh, Serampore =

Mahesh
- Neighbourhood
- মাহেশ
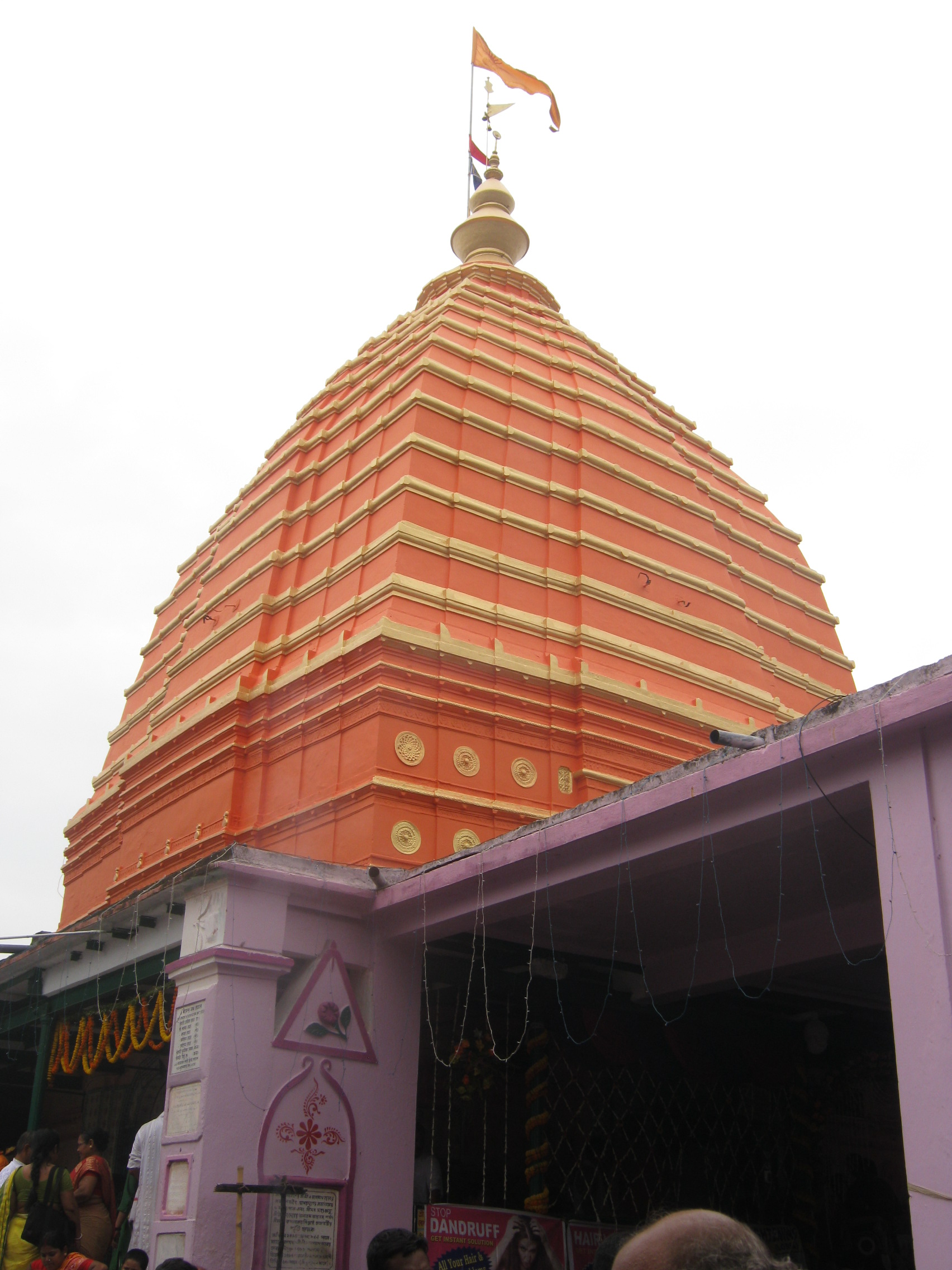
- Jagannath Temple of Mahesh

- Location in West Bengal, India Mahesh (India)
- Coordinates: 22.7351°N 88.3543°E
- Country: India
- State: West Bengal
- District: Hooghly
- City: Serampore
- Ward: 17, 18, 19, 20, 21, 22, 23, 24, 25
- Parliamentary constituency: Srerampur
- Assembly constituency: Sreerampur

Government
  - Member of Legislative Assembly: Dr. Sudipto Roy
  - Municipal Chair Person: Sri. Amiya Mukherjee
  - Member of parliament: Sri. Kalyan Banerjee
- Time zone: UTC+5:30 (IST)
- PIN: 712202
- Area code: 0332 XXX XXXX

Mahesh (Bengali: মাহেশ) is a residential area and a historical neighbourhood in Serampore of Hooghly district in the Indian state of West Bengal. It is a part of the area covered by Kolkata Metropolitan Development Authority (KMDA).

It is the site of a 14th-century temple of Jagannath, and the Rathayatra of Mahesh, which first took place in 1397, and is the second oldest in India.

== See also ==
- Serampore City
- Tin Bazar
- Battala
- Chatra
- Dakshin Rajyadharpur
- Sheoraphuli
