= Ole Bie =

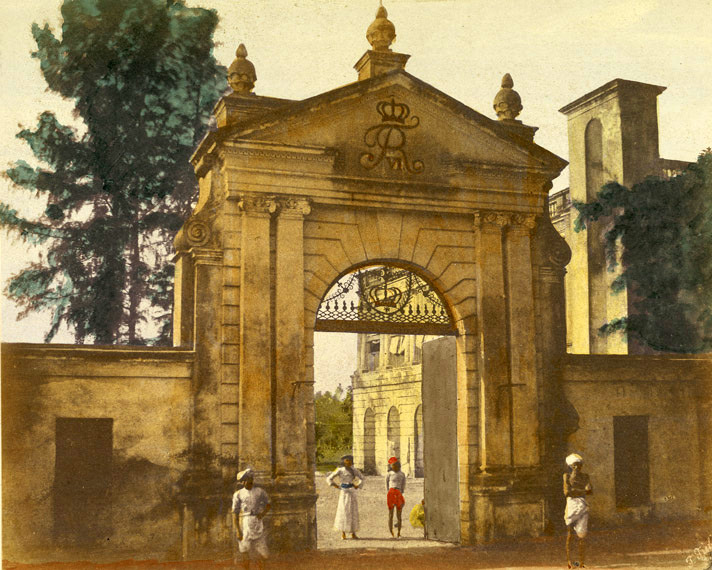
- Danish Gate in Serampore, 1851
- Born: Ole Bie; 7 February 1733; Trondheim, Norway
- Died: 18 May 1805 (aged 72); Serampore, India
- Occupation: Colonial administrator
- Known for: Establishing and leading the colony of Fredriksnagore; supporting humanitarian and cultural development in Serampore
- Notable work: St. Olav's Church, Serampore

Ole Bie (February 7, 1733 – May 18, 1805) was the head of the Danish colony Serampore (under the jurisdiction of Tranquebar) in Bengal, India, for 30 years. The Lutheran Church in Serampore was built under Ole Bie's leadership, marking the beginning of a cultural renaissance in Serampore.

== Biography ==
Bie left Trondheim at the age of 17. He was 23 when he arrived in India. Here, he formed valuable connections within the network of traders and eventually established the colony of Fredriksnagore, named after King Frederick V in Copenhagen. The colony was located a few miles north of Kolkata along a tributary of the Ganges. He oversaw the construction of a church with a tower nearly 40 meters tall. For Bie, who hailed from Trondheim, the church had to be dedicated to Saint Olaf but was strikingly similar to St. Martin-in-the-Fields at Trafalgar Square. In 1800, a group of British missionaries led by William Carey moved to Danish India due to the East India Company's hostility to missionary activity. Bie took them in and allowed them to stay under his protection in Fredriksnagore. From Olav's Church, they worked to improve farming methods for poor farmers, built gardens and canals, conducted biological and botanical studies, and established schools, newspapers, and journals. They also translated the Bible, Ramayana, and Mahabharata into local languages.

As trade routes opened eastward to Europe, the colony had in-demand goods to offer, including spices, cotton, silk, and saltpeter. For 30 years, Bie made significant profits before the enterprise ended in a severe bankruptcy. He was accused of corruption and dismissed for a period when it was discovered that his ships had been charged lower customs duties than the official rates allowed. In Nordic archives, Ole Bie is portrayed as a corrupt official. However, in India, he was a living legend for his support of extensive humanitarian work.

Ole Bie was the brother of the exiled author Jacob Christian Bie.

== Death ==
Bie died on 18 May 1805 in Serampur. He was buried in Danish Cemetery, Serampore.
