= Alaler Gharer Dulal =

1857 novel by Peary Chand Mitra

The Spoilt Child
- Author: Peary Chand Mitra
- Original title: Alaler Gharer Dulal
- Translator: G D Oswell
- Language: Bengali
- Genre: Novel
- Publication date: 1857
- Publication place: India
- English publication date: 1893
- Media type: Print (Hardback)
- Pages: 199

Alaler Gharer Dulal (English: The Spoilt Child আলালের ঘরের দুলাল; published in 1857) is a Bengali novel by Peary Chand Mitra (1814–1883). The writer used the pseudonym Tekchand Thakur for this novel.

The novel describes the society of the nineteenth-century Calcutta with a focus on the lifestyle of its intemperate and prodigal protagonist, Matilal.

The book was one of the earliest Bengali novels. It was also the first piece of Bengali literature to use Cholitobhasa, the colloquial form of the Bengali language. The simple prose style it introduced came to be known as "Alali-style". The novel was first published serially in a monthly magazine, Masik Patrika. Later, a dramatised version was staged at the Bengal Theatre (January 1875).

The second edition (published in 1870) was illustrated by Girindra Kumar Dutta.
