= Battala Woodcut Prints =

Woodcut prints from Battala, India

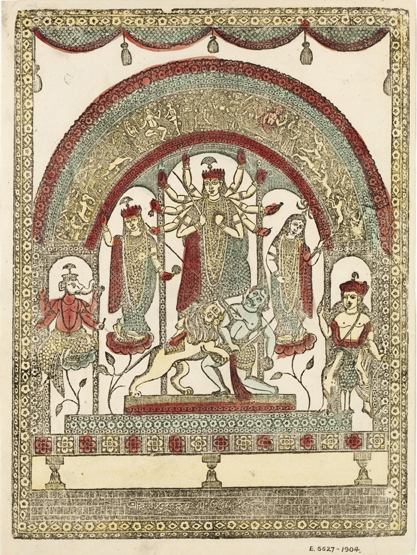
- A Battala woodcut print depicting Durga slaying Mahishasura
- Location of production: Battala
- No. in existence: 100-200

Battala woodcut prints (Bengali: বটতলার কাঠখোদাই, Romanized: Boṭṭolār Kāṭkhodāi) are the woodcut relief prints produced in the Battala region of Calcutta. These were a distinctive artform that flourished in 19th-century Bengal, particularly in the urban milieu of colonial Calcutta. These prints, produced in the Battala neighborhood, were known for their affordability, bold imagery, and accessibility, making them popular among the burgeoning middle class. Although woodblock printing on fabrics has been in India for centuries, the paper adaptation of woodblock printing appeared relatively late. Reproducing pictures using blocks began in India around the same time as the printing of books on paper, following the introduction of the printing press from Western sources. This marked the simultaneous development of the mass production of both books and images in India, aligning with the age of the printing press and the modern period. Battala woodcut printing had a remarkably short run due to its late entry into the Indian market and the advent of colour lithography. The Battala woodcuts were printed on a very cheap newsprint like paper to keep the cost of these prints low. Because of the short run, cheap paper and humid conditions of the region very few of these prints have survived.

== History ==
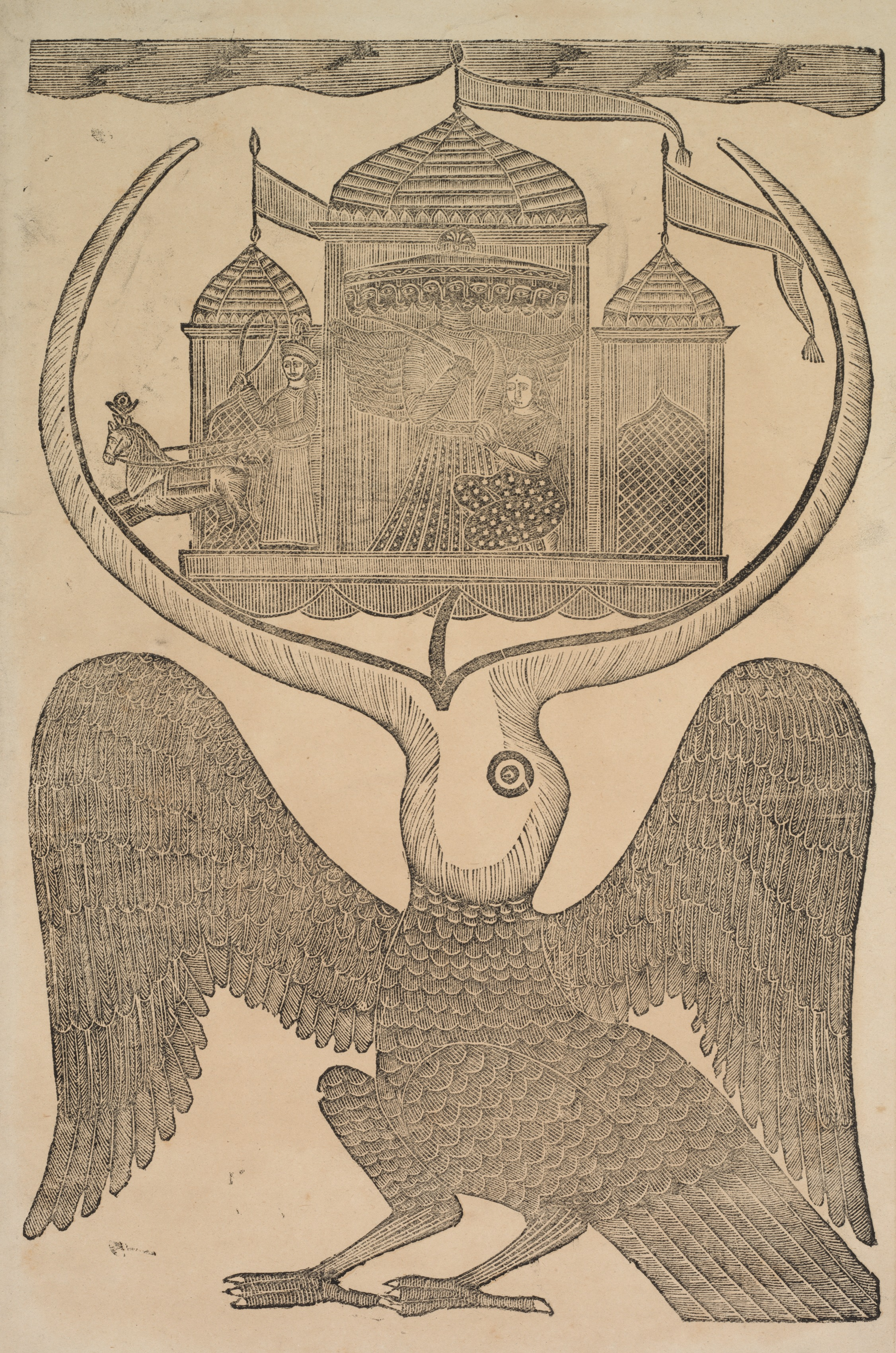
(Top) A Battala print of Jatayu trying to prevent the abduction of Sita by Ravana; (Bottom) A Kalighat Painting depicting the same scene. The striking similarity in composition—highlights how Battala engravers often borrowed popular imagery from Kalighat pats.

In the early 19th century, the Battala area, situated near the northern part of Calcutta, became known for the prints, which typically had a religious or mystical theme. It emerged as a hub of commercial printing and publishing in the early 19th century. The neighborhood’s woodcut printing industry developed alongside the growing demand for inexpensive literature and visual art that catered to a diverse audience. These prints were often bound into chapbooks or used as standalone illustrations, complementing the narratives of popular Bengali texts.

They made their first appearance in the 1820s as book illustrations; by the mid nineteenth century printmakers started printing the smaller prints, which often represented Kalighat paintings. By the 1860s and 1870s, the wood and metal engravers of Battala had become the leading artisan community in Calcutta's art market. Their prints emerged as the most prominent examples of 'bazaar' art, increasingly marginalizing Kalighat pictures. The rise of Battala woodcut prints coincided with a period of rapid urbanization and cultural exchange in Bengal. As literacy rates increased and a new middle class emerged, there was a growing appetite for affordable art and literature. Battala prints served as a medium to disseminate religious stories, folklore, pulp fictions, and moral lessons, as well as to provide entertainment.

By the turn of the century, demand for the prints began to decline with the introduction of color lithography printing. During the 1860s and 1870s, the Kalighat patuas and the Battala engravers were engaged in intense competition, with the latter often incorporating popular imagery from Kalighat pats and encroaching on their market. However, advancements in printing technology that had initially empowered the Battala engravers eventually led to their decline. Their craft and trade rapidly diminished due to competition from lithography and oleography. By the 1880s, Calcutta's popular art market was dominated by hand-colored lithographs produced by the Calcutta Art Studio, run by former students of the Calcutta School of Art, alongside English chromolithographs that replicated the Art Studio's works with greater precision and at a fraction of the cost.

== Techniques and style ==
=== The woodcut process ===
Woodcut printing involved carving intricate designs into wooden blocks, which were then inked and pressed onto paper. This technique enabled the mass production of prints at a low cost, making them widely accessible. Battala, an important center for woodcuts, saw multiple artisans collaborating in the production process. The woodcutters primarily lived around the Chitpur and Shobhabazar areas. Generally, woodblocks were used for the process, while metal plates, which were more durable for creating a higher number of prints from a single block, were also used. Stone and burnt clay were additionally employed in printing, with some artisans specializing in block carving while others focused on hand-coloring the prints.

A map of some areas where the woodcut engravers were located.

=== Features ===
Battala woodcut prints were characterized by bold outlines, simplified forms, and dramatic compositions. Initially, artisan groups such as ironsmiths, coppersmiths, and gold- and silversmiths (including Kansaris, Shankharis, Swarnakars, and Karmakars) found employment in British-operated printing presses in Serampore and Calcutta. These artisans adapted their metalworking skills to create typefaces and engraved blocks. By the 1820s and 1830s, they formed a distinct community that specialized in woodblock printing, well-suited for producing inexpensive, small-sized illustrations in affordable Bengali books from Battala. These books spanned a wide range of genres, from religious texts and almanacs to popular fiction and adventure stories.

By the 1830s, Battala emerged as the central hub for Bengali printing and publishing, with numerous small presses established in areas such as Shobhabazar, Dorjitola, Ahiritola, Kumortuli, Garanhata, Simulia, and Bagbazar. These printers and engravers focused on meeting the demand for affordable prints on inexpensive paper, resulting in prints of lower quality compared to the more refined European engravings produced in Calcutta during the same period.

=== Stylistic trends ===
Battala prints typically featured a flat, decorative, and two-dimensional style, often emphasizing stark contrasts of black and white. The figures, similar to those in rural pats, were stylized and not naturalistic, relying on thick, curving lines and bold hatchings to convey volume and mass. These figures were arranged across a flattened pictorial space, with backgrounds and clothing decorated with repetitive cross-hatching and small ornamental motifs.

The themes in these prints often echoed those found in Kalighat, satirizing the upper-class babu, his indulgent lifestyle, and his subjugation by immoral women. Although the style was primarily influenced by local traditions, European elements occasionally appeared in the prints, particularly in architectural motifs derived from British Calcutta. For example, Corinthian columns and archways were used in scenes like Yashoda and Krishna churning butter, while European furniture appeared in images of both European couples and local mythological scenes, such as "Rasaraj and Rasamanjari."

Rama and Sita in Royal Palace - An example of the usage of colour in the Battala woodcut prints.

=== Colour usage ===
In Calcutta, popular art naturally mirrored Western printing techniques, which were primarily produced by Europeans and became widely available in the city's bazaars. This influence is evident in the Battala woodcuts. Like their Western counterparts, these prints were hand-colored, but without the use of stencils. Instead, the artists applied the colors directly with broad strokes. Many prints used a limited color range, but some were hand-colored to enhance their visual appeal. As Nikhil Sarkar observed, "The colored print was essentially a plain print with splashes of red, yellow, blue, and green applied in certain areas."

== See more ==
- Kalighat Painting
- Woodcut
- Woodblock
- Pattachitra
