= Battala =

Battala বটতলা
- Neighbourhood
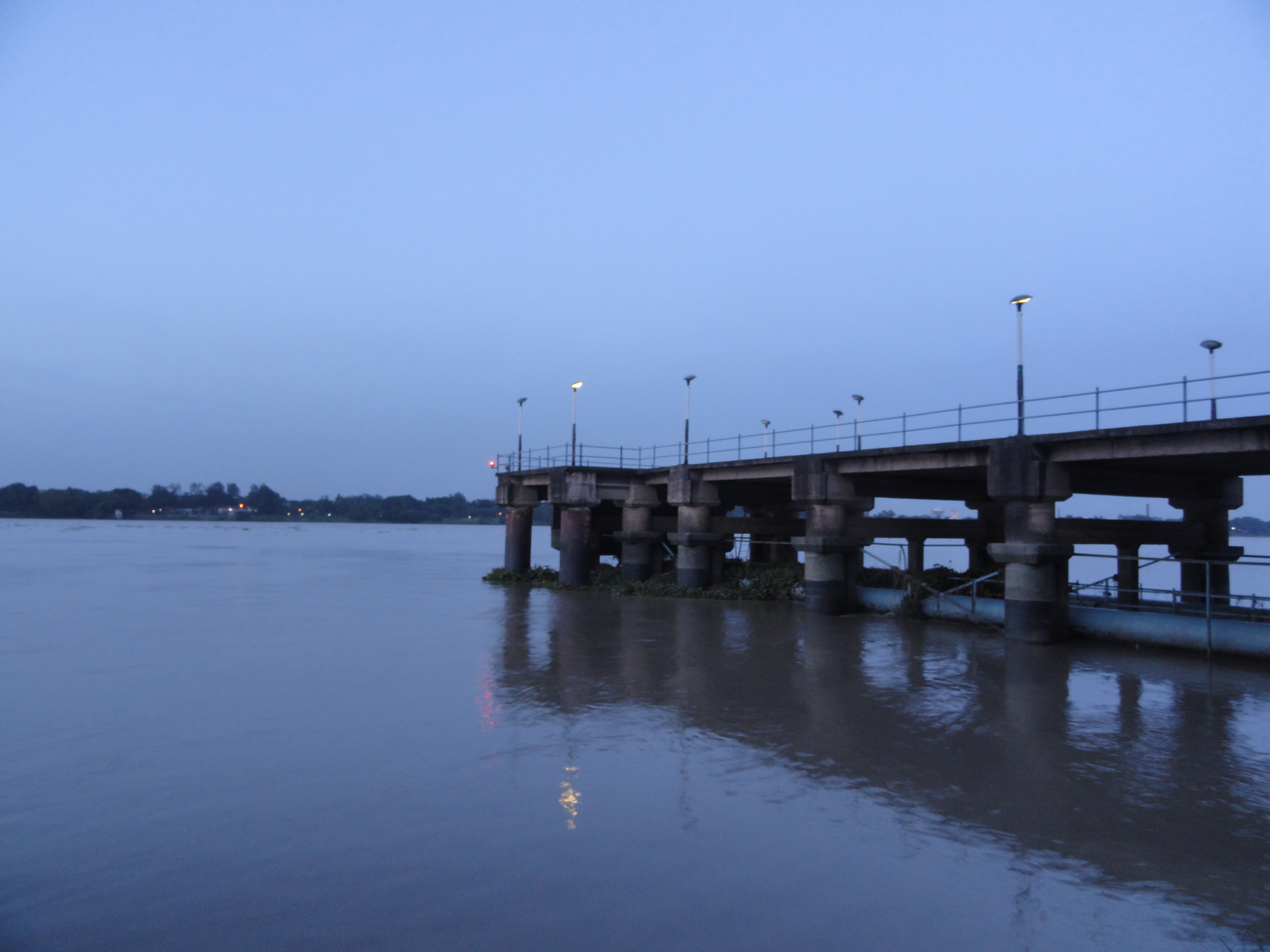
- Dey Ghat at Battala

- Location in West Bengal, India Battala (India)
- Coordinates: 22°44′59.27″N 88°20′48.01″E
- Country: India
- State: West Bengal
- District: Hooghly
- City: Serampore
- Ward: 11, 12, 13
- Parliamentary constituency: Serampore
- Assembly constituency: Sreerampur

Government
  - Member of Legislative Assembly: Dr. Sudipto Roy
  - Municipal Chair Person: Sri. Amiya Mukherjee
  - Member of parliament: Kalyan Banerjee
- Time zone: UTC+5:30 (IST)
- PIN: 712201
- Area code: 0332 XXX XXXX

Battala is a highly populated area and a semi industrial neighbourhood in central Serampore of Hooghly district in the Indian state of West Bengal. It is a part of the area covered by Kolkata Metropolitan Development Authority (KMDA). The Battala region was an important center for printing books and Battala Prints.It is said the name of this place came from a banyan tree in Chitpur-Sovabazar area where traders used to gather.

== Education ==
- Akna Girl's High School
- Malina Lahiri Boys' Academy
- Ballavpur High School
- Adarsha Balika Vidyalaya
- Bharati Balika Vidyalaya

== See also ==
- Serampore City
- Tin Bazar
- Chatra
- Mahesh
- Dakshin Rajyadharpur
- Sheoraphuli
