= Mahesh High School =

Location
- 8, Jannagar Rd, Mahesh Masirbari, Mahesh Colony; Serampore, West Bengal, 712202; India; 22.7418371°N 88.3490076°E

Information
- Established: 1923

Mahesh High School is a school situated at Mahesh, Serampore in Hooghly district. It was established in 1923 by Bagala Prasad Bhattacharya, an Indian freedom fighter.

== Athletics ==
The school is renowned for its sports programs. Mahesh High has turned out many good players of soccer and volleyball. Kingshuk Debnath, the Mohun Bagan defender, played for Mohun Bagan.

== See also ==
- Education in India
- List of schools in India
- Education in West Bengal
