= St. Olav's Church, Serampore =

Coordinates: 22.7571°N 88.3427°E

St. Olav's Church
- সেন্ট ওলাভ'স চার্চ
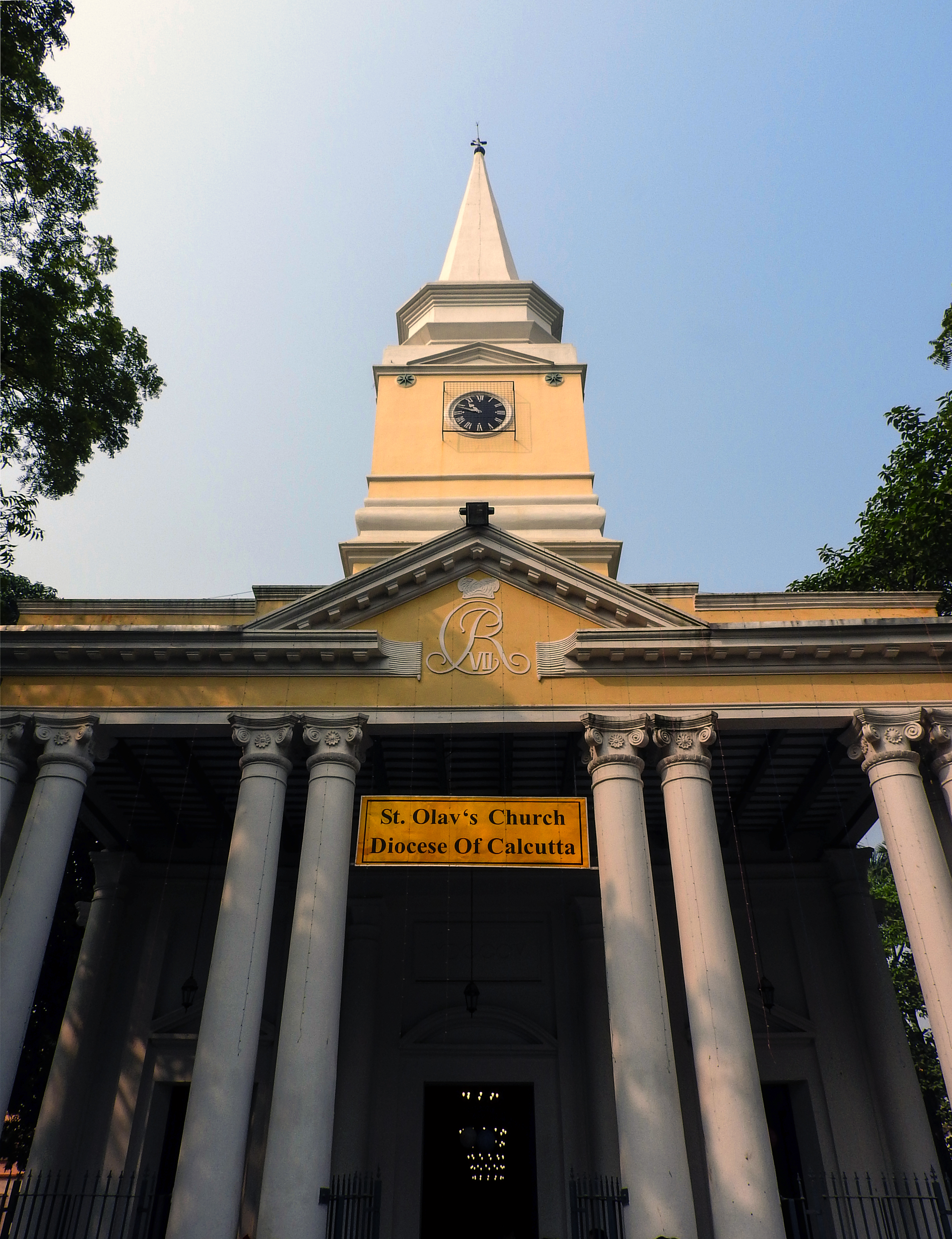
- Front façade of St.Olav's Church
- St. Olav's Church
- Location: 1 no., Church Road, Dr. Bishwanath Jot Sarani, Tin Bazar; Serampore – 712201, West Bengal
- Country: India
- Denomination: Protestant

History
- Status: Active
- Founded: 1806
- Founder: Ole Bie
- Dedication: Saint Olav

Architecture
- Functional status: Active
- Completed: 1806

St. Olav's Church (Bengali: সেন্ট ওলাভ'স চার্চ, romanized: Sēnṭa ōlābha'sa cārca) is a protestant church in Serampore, West Bengal, India. Also known as St Olave's Danish Church, it was built in the early 19th century, when the area was part of Fredriksnagore – then a small (50 km²) colony of Denmark-Norway. The building is now jointly controlled by the Church of North India (CNI) and Serampore College Council.

== History ==
Locally known as the Danish Church, it was one of the 100 buildings constructed by the Danish management between 1755 and 1845, at a time when the town was called Fredriksnagore.

A major restoration project there was rewarded by the 2016 UNESCO Asia Pacific Heritage Awards.

== Architecture ==
The entrance has an open portico of twin columns under a broken-base pediment containing the royal monogram of Christian VII, king of Denmark when the church was consecrated. Above the portico is a bell tower that also contains a clock. One of the church bells is inscribed "FREDERICKS VÆRCK ANNO 1804", indicating it originated from a Danish factory.

The church is flat roofed, inside and out. The church is not particularly Scandinavian, but reflects the designs of contemporary churches in British India, in particular those in Calcutta, which were inspired by contemporaneous designs popular in Britain, such as St. Martin-in-the-Fields in London.

== Gallery ==
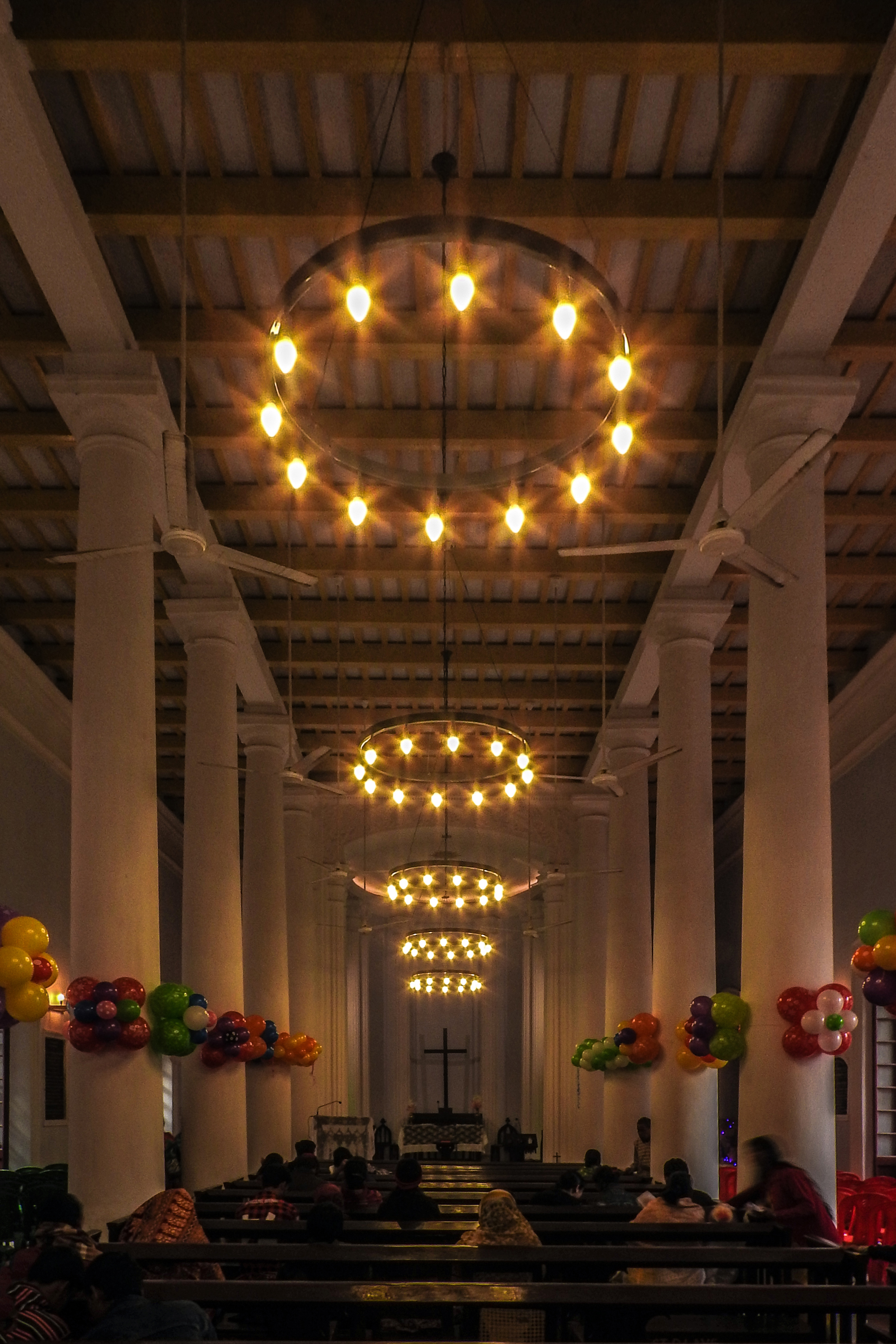
Interior of the church
