= Nata mandir =

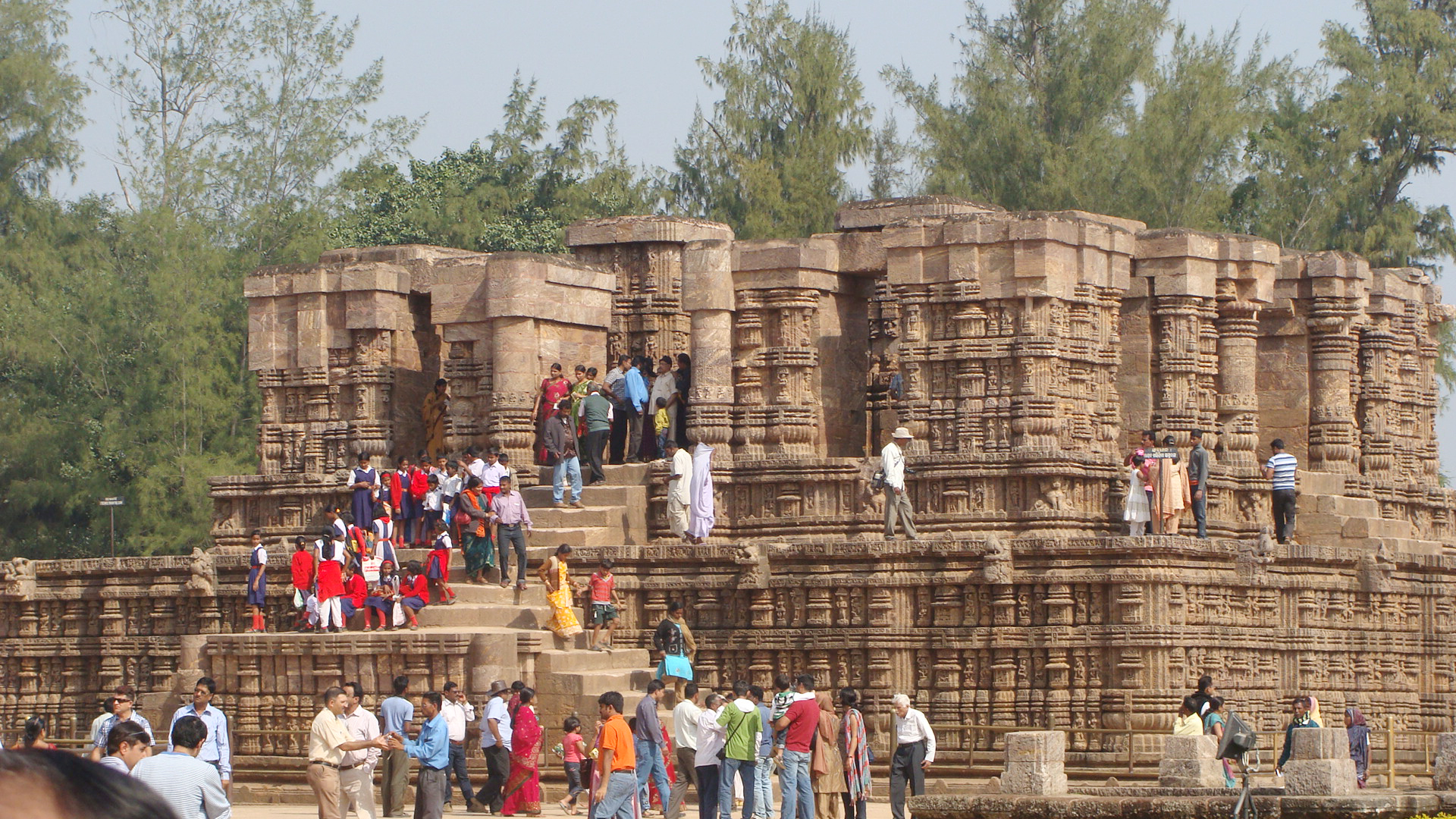
The Nata mandir of the Sun Temple in Konarak

A Nata mandira (or Nata mandapa) is the dance hall of a Hindu temple. It is one of the buildings of the temple, especially in the Kalinga architecture. The name comes from the sanskrit Nata (=dance) and Mandira (=temple). The most known nata mandiras are the Temple of Surya at Konark and the Lingaraja temple in Bhubaneswar.

The Nata mandira refers to the time of the devadasis tradition when it was prevalent in India. Dancers lived in temple premises solely dedicating their lives to reputed dance forms like Odissi and Bharathanatyam. Though modern times saw the decline of this tradition, the platforms built for performances still stay as major component of the temple architecture.
