= Danish Cemetery, Serampore =

Cemetery in West Bengal

Danish Cemetery
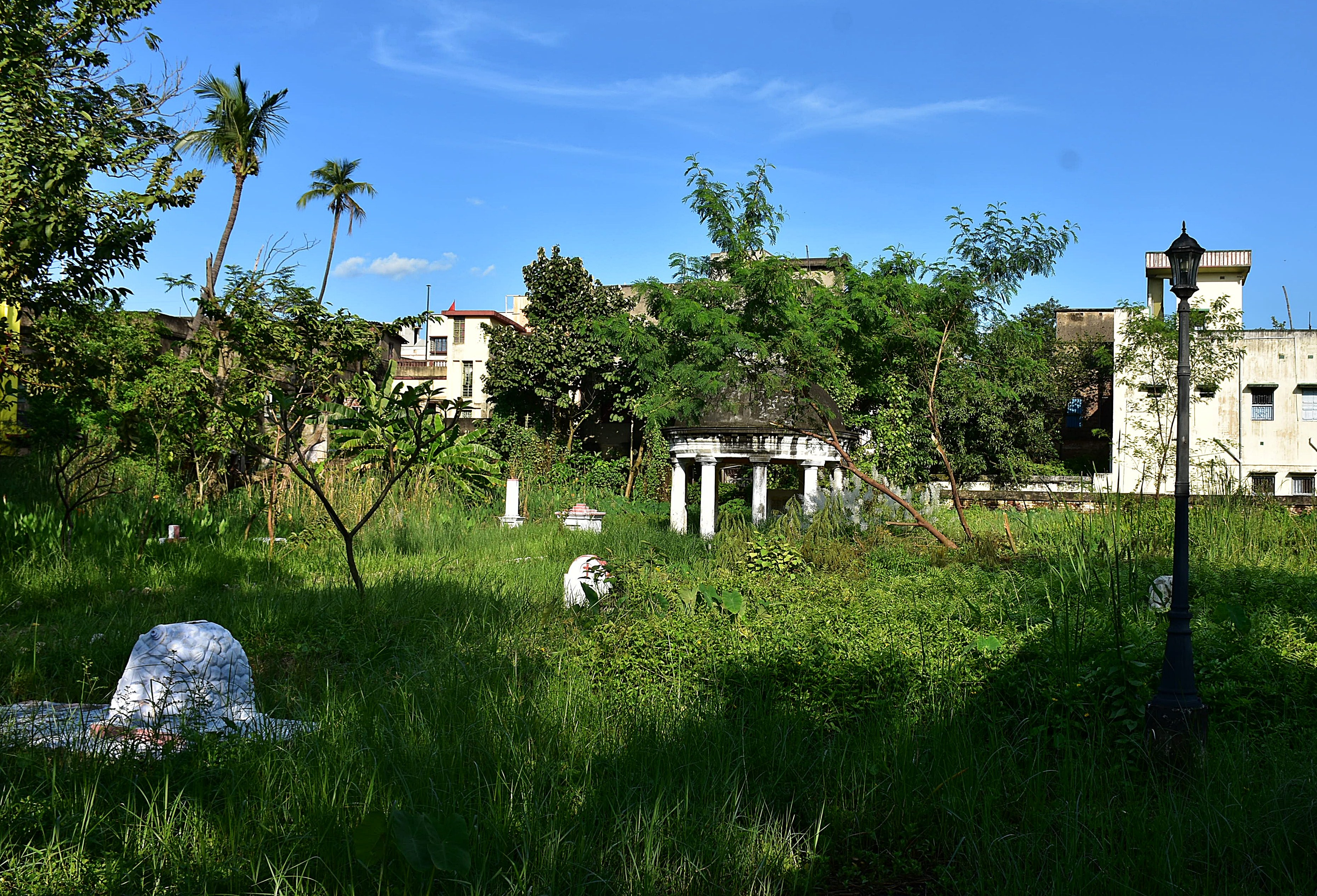
- Inside the Danish Cemetery
- Interactive map of Danish Cemetery

Details
- Established: 1789
- Location: Serampore, Hooghly district, West Bengal
- Country: India
- Type: Christian cemetery

Danish Cemetery, Serampore is a colonial cemetery situated in Serampore, Hooghly district, in the Indian state of West Bengal. It is one of the most notable Danish cemeteries in South Asia.

== History ==
Serampore was an early settlement of the Danish East India Company in 1755, and was named Frederiksnagore. When the Danish settlement expanded, the cemetery was established to serve the Christian population of the colony. Administrators, officers, soldiers and family members of European residents were buried there. The cemetery remained in use until Denmark sold this establishment to the East India Company in 1845. Presently the burial site is maintained by the Archaeological Survey of India (ASI).

== Notable graves ==
- Ole Bie, Governor of the Danish settlement (1776 to 1805)
- Jacob Krefting, Governor of the Danish settlement
- Casper Top

== Gallery ==
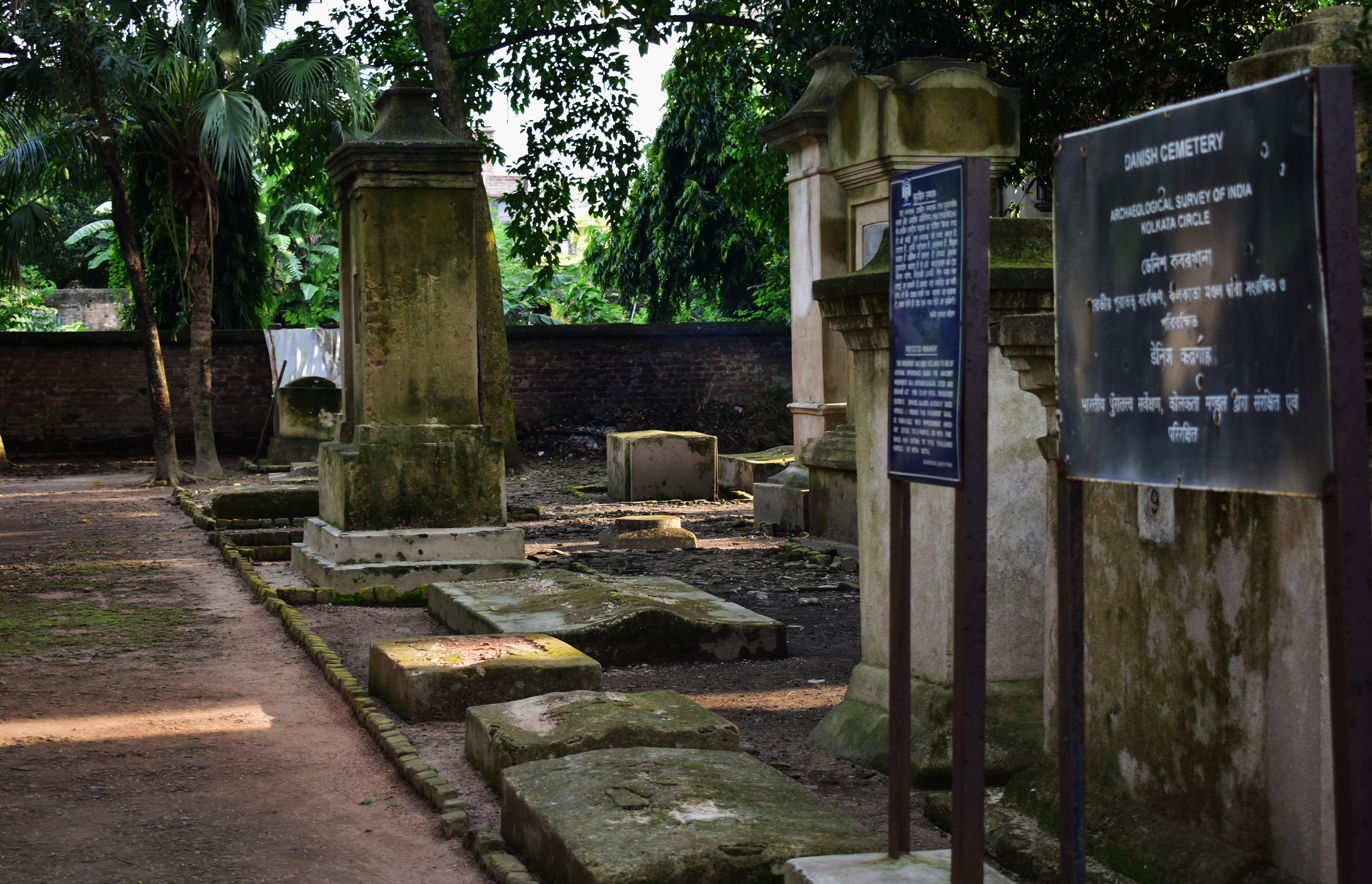
Danish Cemetery Title Board

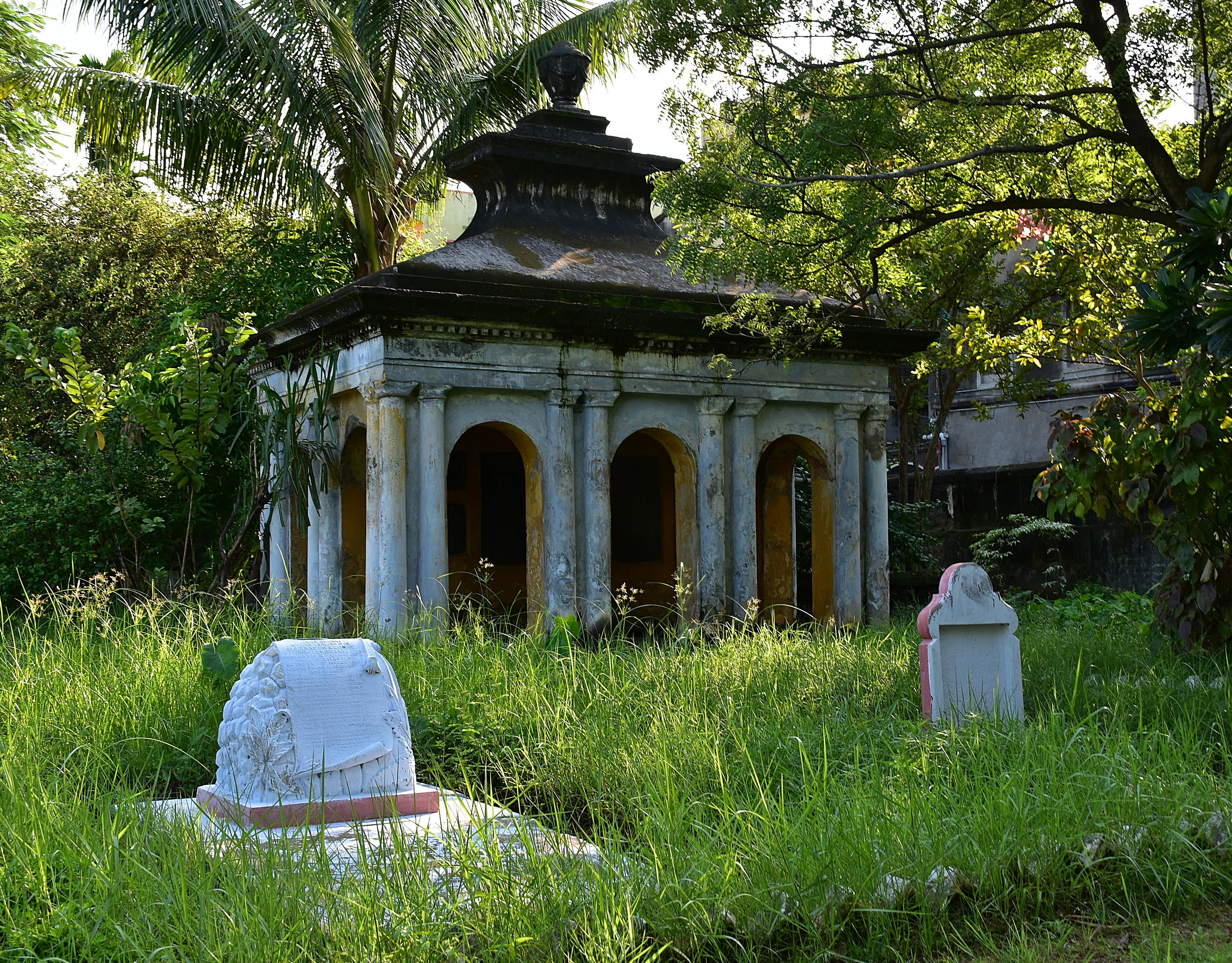
A structure in the cemetery

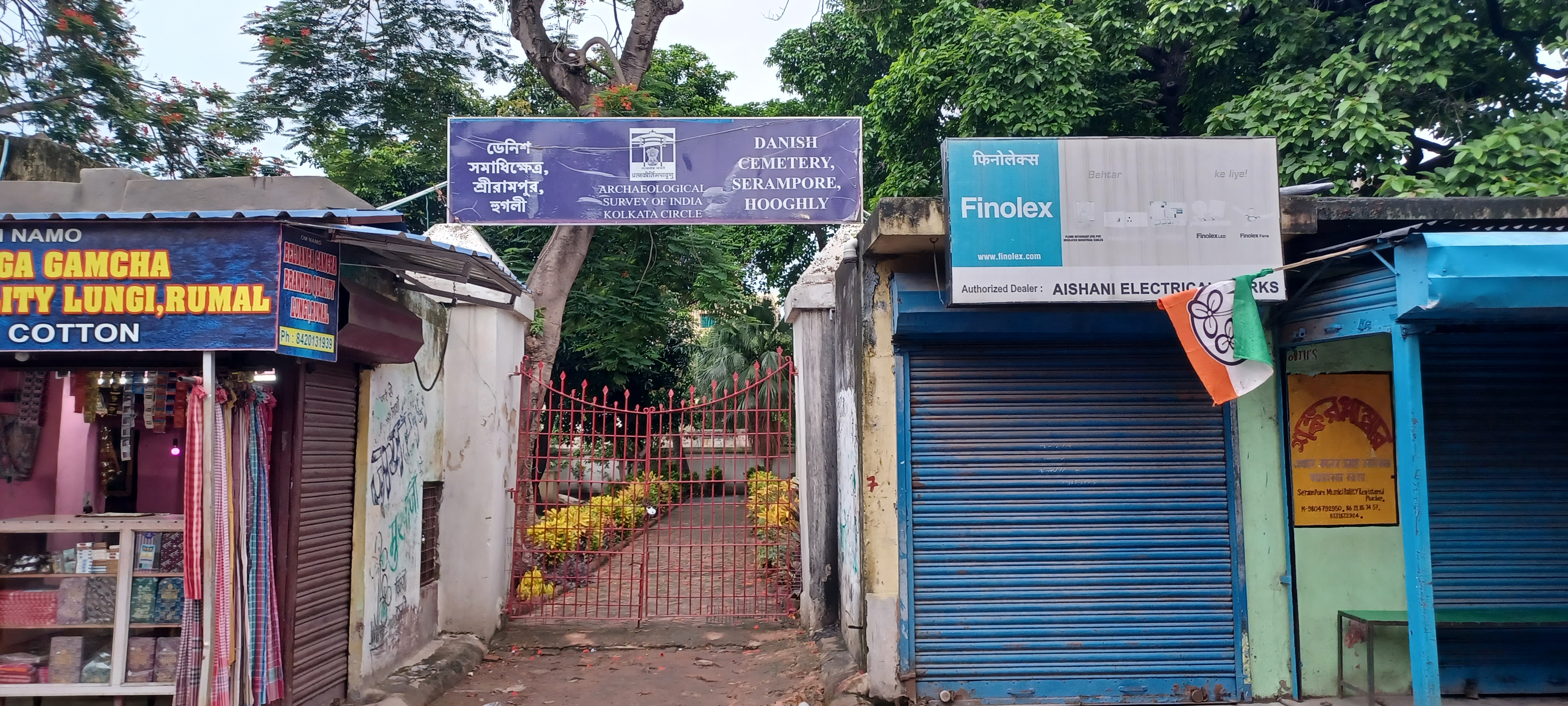
Entrance to Danish Cemetery

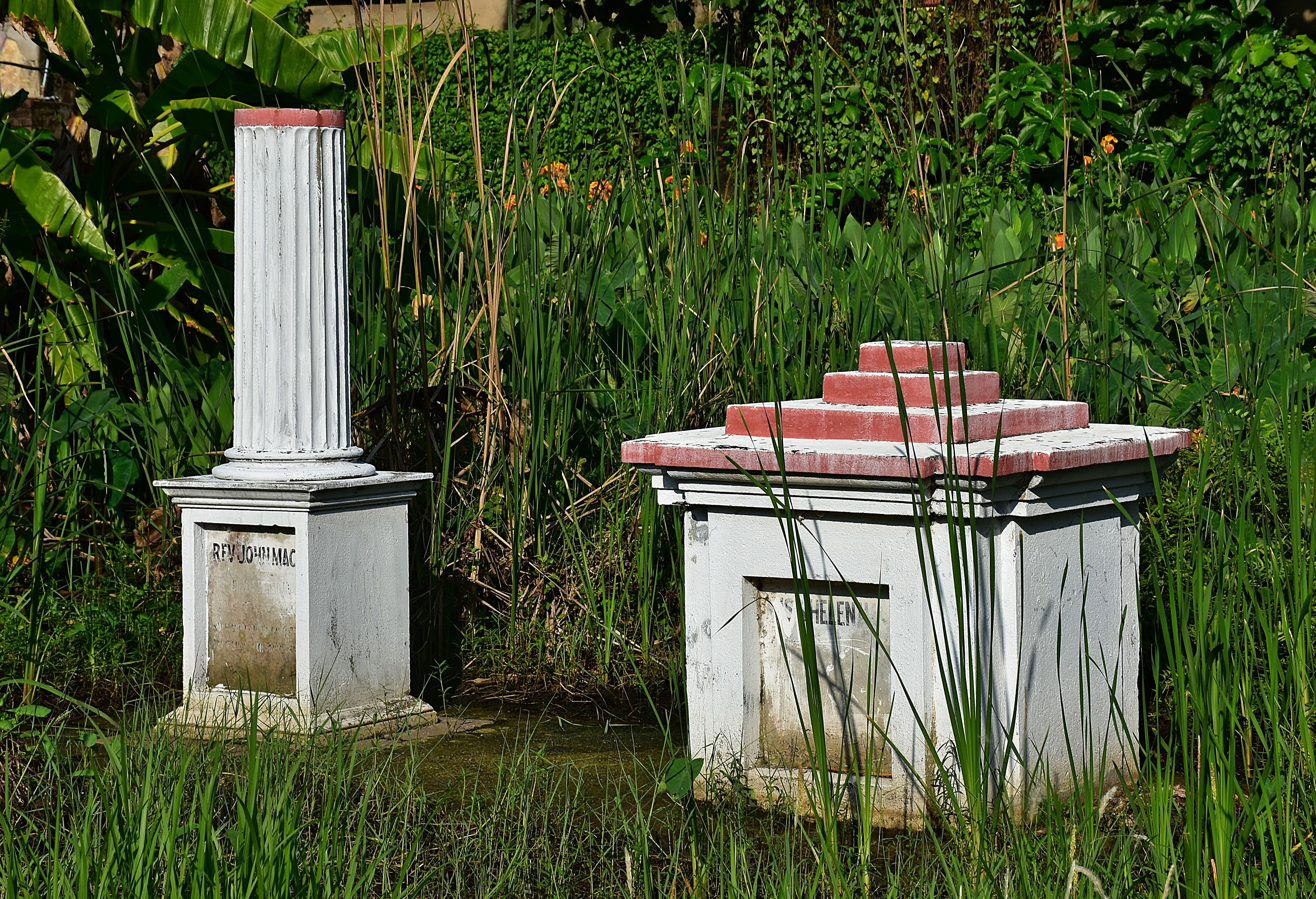
Tombs in Danish Cemetery

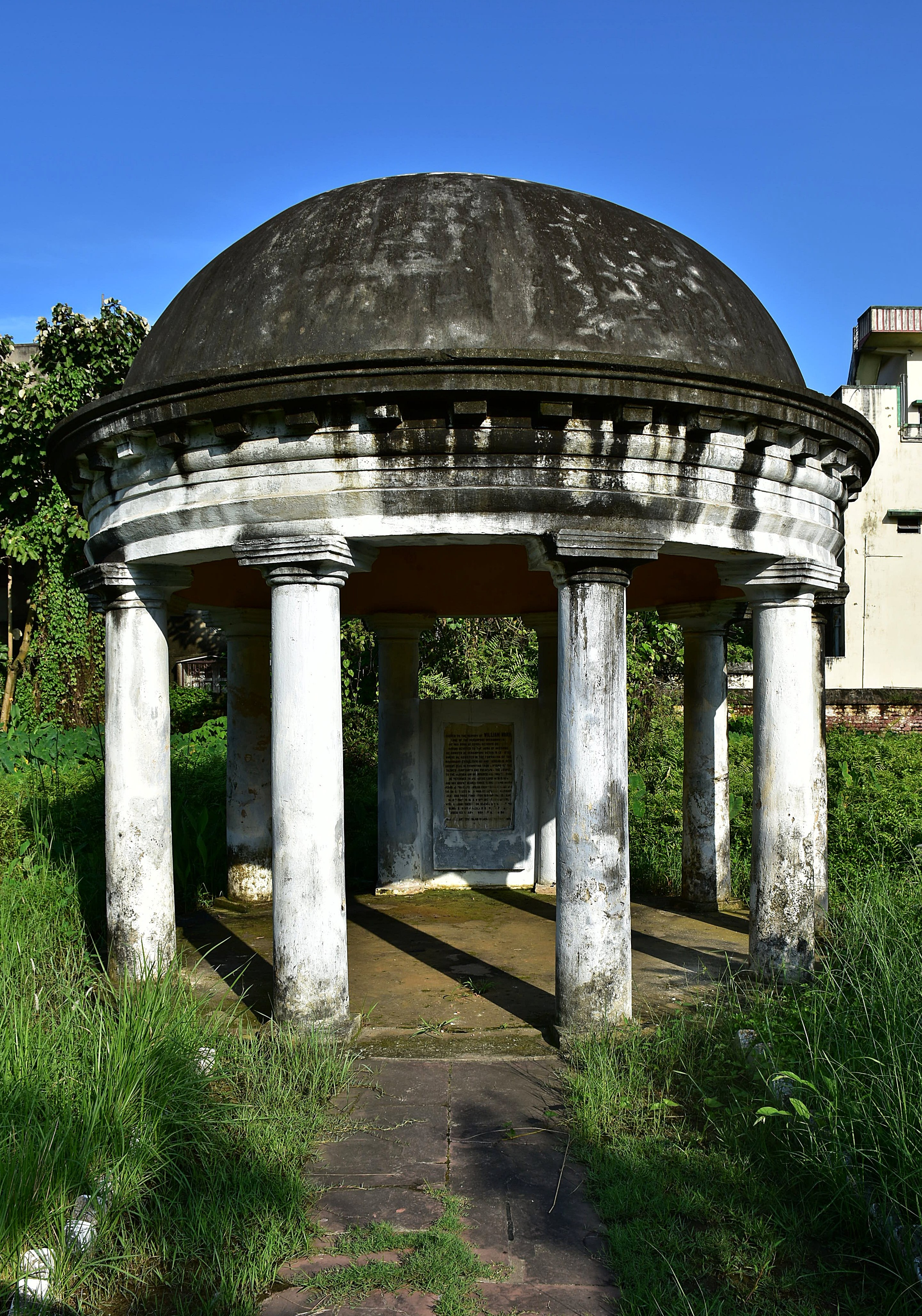
A tomb in Danish Cemetery
