= Akalabodhana =

Worship of Durga in the month of Ashvin

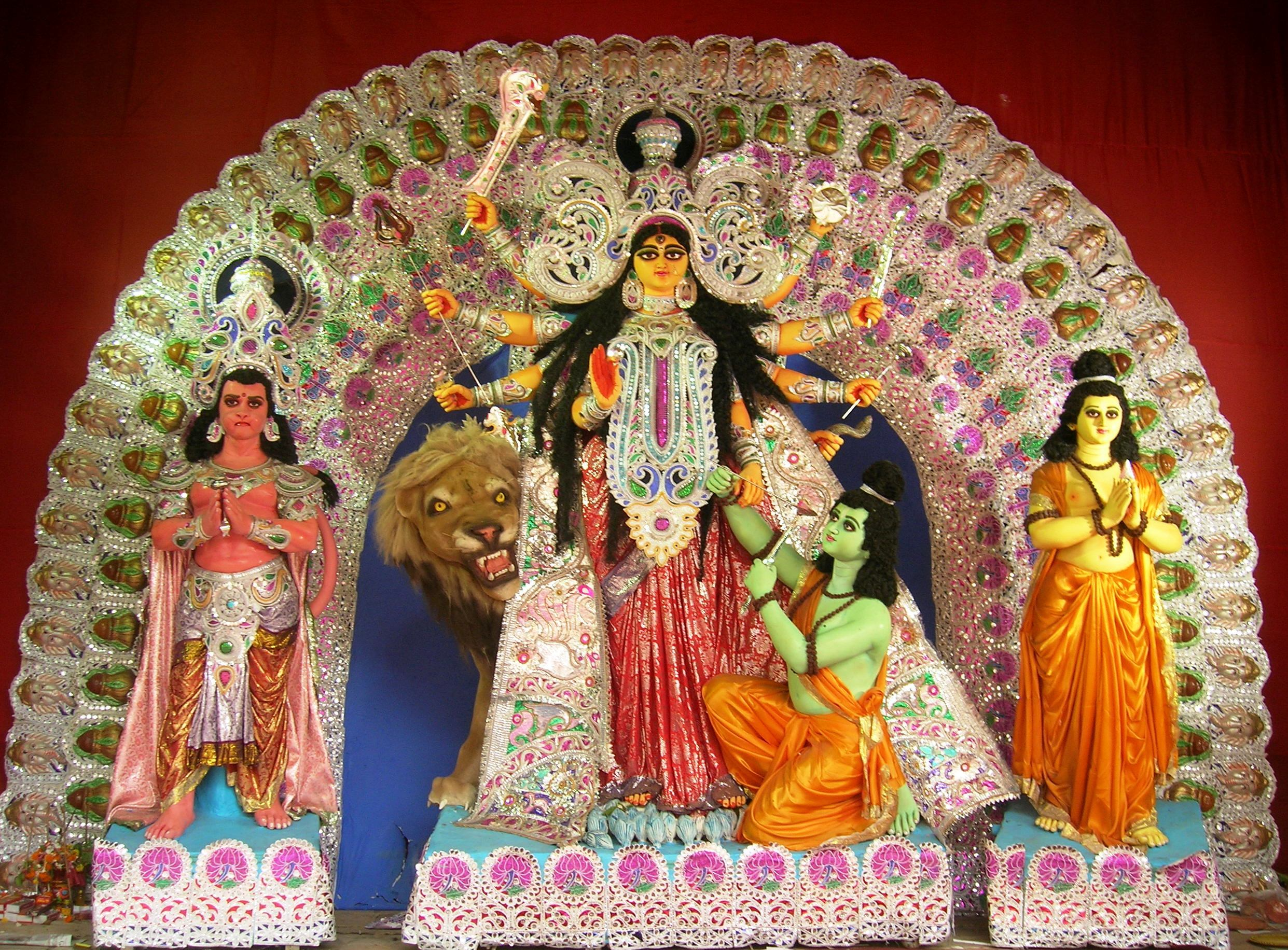
A scene of Akalabodhana, the untimely realization of Durga by Rama, as described in the Krittivasi Ramayana; Puja mandapa of Khidirpur Venus Club, Kolkata, 2010

Akalabodhana (Sanskrit: अकालबोधन, romanized: akālabodhana) or Akal Bodhan (Bengali: অকালবোধন) is the worship of Durga—an incarnation of Devi—in the month of Ashvin, an uncustomary time for commencement of her worship.

== Etymology ==
Akala and bodhana are both derived from the Sanskrit word akālabodhana, which are also included in many other Indo-Aryan languages. The word Akala means untimely, and bodhana means awakening. Akalabodhana refers to the untimely awakening of the goddess Durga for her worship.

== Legend ==
According to the Bengali version of Bhagavata Purana, when Ravana awakened Kumbhakarna and sent him to fight in the Lanka war, Rama was terrified. Brahma assured Rama and told him to worship Durga for success on the battlefield. Rama told Brahma that this was not the proper time (akala) to worship the goddess as it was the Krishna Paksha (waning moon), prescribed for her sleep. Brahma assured Rama that he would perform a puja for the awakening (bodhana) of the goddess. Rama agreed and appointed Brahma as the purohita (priest) of the ritual. Brahma performed the puja from the period of Krishna Navami till the death of the Ravana, during Shukla Navami. Following the instructions of Brahma, Rama praised the goddess by uttering Katyanaya hymn. Brahma uttered the Devi Sukta from the Vedas to please Durga. He vowed to offer 108 lotuses to Bhagavatī Durgā and he was short by just 1 flower. Since everyone else used to tell him how his eyes are the equivalent of lotuses and he is literally Kamalanayana i.e. the lotus eyed one. So, he thought to offer his eyes to the divine mother as a substitute. He then pulled out an arrow and was about to gouge his own eye balls out to offer, when the goddess appeared and stopped him. Pleased with him, she blessed him and declared that a great war between Rama and Ravana would occur between Shukla Saptami to Shukla Navami. On Saptami, she announced that she would enter Rama's bow and arrows. When ashtami (eighth day) would end and navami (ninth day) would begin, she proclaimed that she would cut Ravana's heads one after another. Finally, she assured that in the afternoon of Shukla Navami, she would destroy Ravana completely.

In a Bengali rendering of the Ramayana legend, Rama travelled to Lanka to rescue his abducted wife, Sita, from Ravana, the rakshasa king. Ravana was a devotee of Durga, who worshipped her in a temple in Lanka. However, angered by the abduction of Sita, a form of the great goddess, Durga shifted her loyalties to Rama. When Rama grew intimidated by the prospect of war, Brahma counselled him to worship Durga, who would bless him with courage. Rama worshipped Durga underneath a bilva tree, chanting the Devi Sukta and other Tantric hymns for her propitiation. Pleased, Durga appeared before Rama and blessed him with victory, and the boon of being able to slay Ravana. Armed with a weapon granted to him by Durga, Rama was able to kill Ravana and rescue his wife.

== See also ==
- Durga Puja
