= Serampore =

City in West Bengal, India

Serampore Srirampore Sreerampur
- City
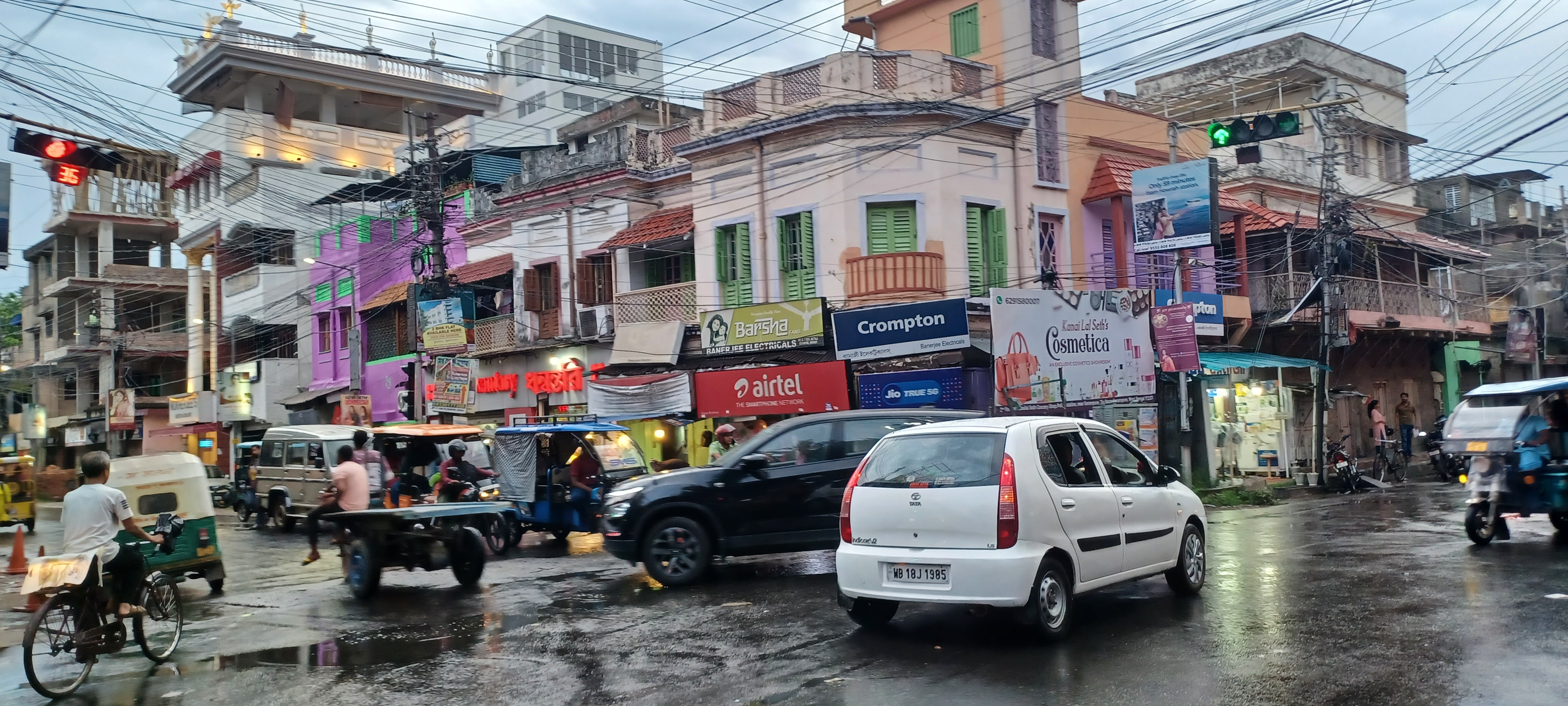
- Nickname: Frederiknagore (1755–1845)
- Location in West Bengal, India Serampore (India)
- Coordinates: 22.75°N 88.34°E
- Country: India
- State: West Bengal
- Division: Burdwan
- District: Hooghly
- Subdivision: Srirampore
- Founder: Danish
- Named for: Shri Ramsita Temple

Government
  - Type: Municipality
  - Body: Serampore Municipality
  - Chair Person: Giridhari Saha (AITC)
  - MP: Kalyan Banerjee (AITC)
  - MLA: Bhaskar Bhattacharya (BJP); Dilip Singh (BJP)

Area
  - Total: 11.60 km^{2} (4.48 sq mi)
- Elevation: 17 m (56 ft)

Population (2011)
  - Total: 181,842
  - Density: 15,680/km^{2} (40,600/sq mi)

Languages
  - Official: Bengali, English
- Time zone: UTC+5:30 (IST)
- PIN: 712201, 712202, 712203
- Telephone code: +91 33
- Vehicle registration: WB 15, WB 16, WB 17, WB 18
- Sex ratio: 941 females per 1,000 males
- Literacy Rate: 88.73%
- Lok Sabha constituency: Srerampur
- Vidhan Sabha constituency: Sreerampur and Champdani
- Website: www.seramporemunicipality.net.in//

Serampore (Bengali: [ʃriɾampuɾ]) is a city in Hooghly district of the Indian state of West Bengal. It serves as the headquarters of the Srirampore subdivision and is part of the area covered by Kolkata Metropolitan Development Authority (KMDA). Located on the west bank of the Hooghly River, it was a pre-colonial city that was part of Danish India under the name Frederiknagore from 1755 to 1845.

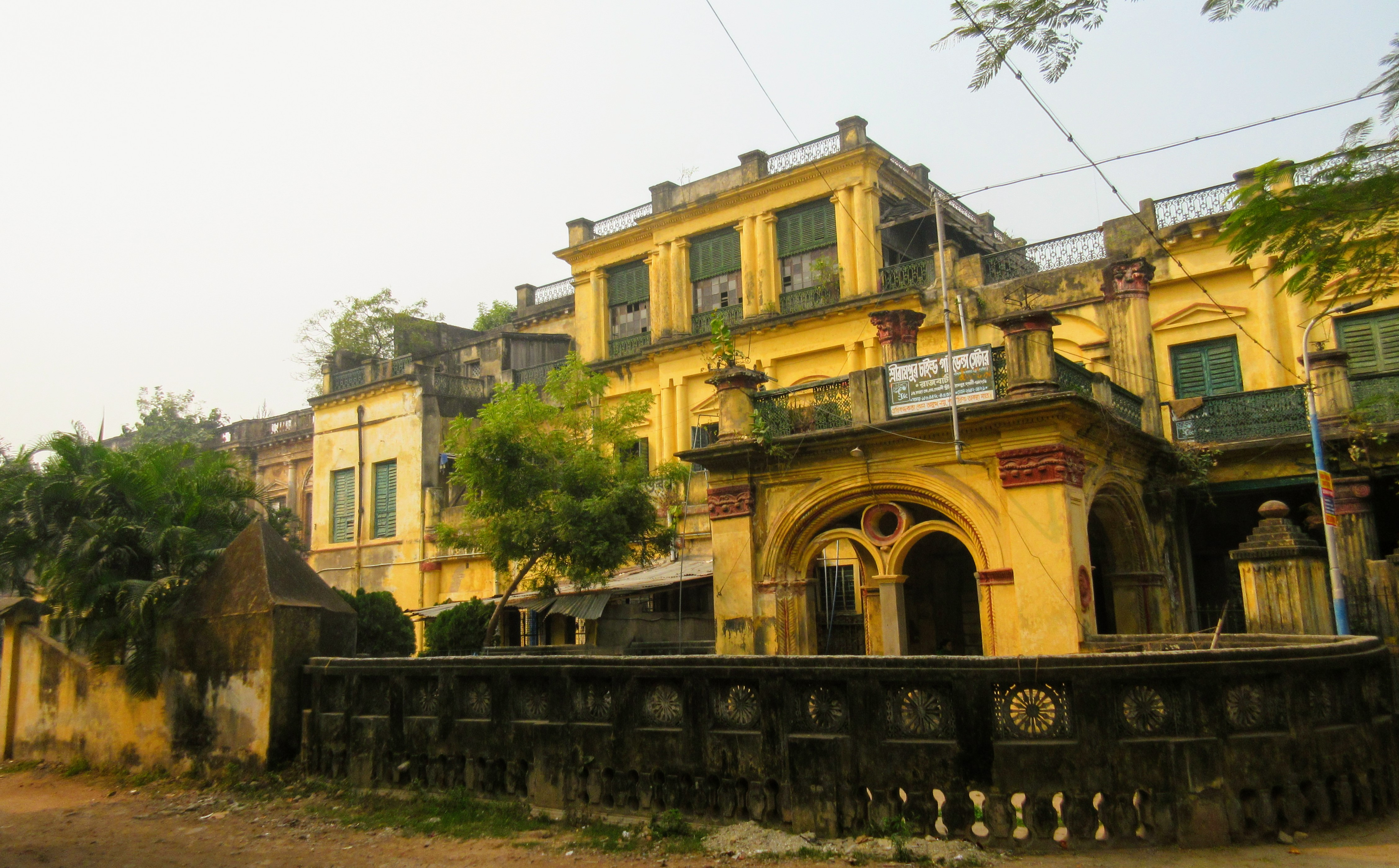
Front façade of Serampore Rajbari, Chatra

== Etymology ==
The name 'Serampore' (also known as 'Srirampur') is believed to have originated from terms such as 'Sripur', 'Sri Ram', or potentially 'Seetarampore', which is associated with a prominent Ram-Seeta temple in the region. The modern city of Serampore was formed through the amalgamation of several villages, including Mahesh, Ballavpur, Akna, Sripur, Gopinathpur, Manoharpur, Chatra, Rajyadharapur, Naoga, Sheoraphuli, and Shimla-Sataghara.

== History ==
The city is several centuries old and has undergone significant transformations. It witnessed the arrival and establishment of a Danish settlement, which was later followed by a period of British rule. After the British acquisition in 1845, the city experienced substantial industrial development, including the construction of railways and factories, leading to its emergence as an industrial hub.

The process of urbanization in Serampore can be understood through three distinct phases: a pre-urbanization period occurring before 1755, an urbanization phase spanning from 1755 to 1854, and an industrialization phase from 1854 to 1947.

=== Pre-urbanisation (before 1755) ===
Prior to the Mughal era, the area situated between the Saraswati River and Hooghly River was a flourishing local community. Sheoraphuli served as a crucial distribution center for goods produced throughout Hooghly, which encouraged many families to settle in the area before 1755.

Certain cultivating communities, including Sadgops and Manas, established settlements in specific areas such as Sadgop Para, Mana Para, and Lallakanta Para. Indigenous groups like the Jele Kaibartas and 'Sani' Muchis were present from the early days, residing in their designated localities. The area also hosted Sunni Muslims, who were descendants of Mughal soldiers, traders, and artisans; they lived in Mullick Para and Mussalman Para, where a mosque stands as evidence of their historical presence. During the Mughal period, Akna (now known as Akra Bati Lane) and Mahesh were densely populated. The region's warm and humid climate was ideal for the textile industry, with local lands renowned for cultivating cotton and silk. Hindu weavers specialized in producing fine cotton fabrics, while Muslim weavers dominated silk manufacturing. Additionally, the fertile land yielded abundant crops of paddy, jute, and betel-leaf, and the Kaibartas utilized the marshy areas for fishing.

In the era preceding its urbanization, primary communication in the Serampore region was facilitated by river routes, complemented by the presence of the 'Badshahi Sadak' (Grand Trunk Road). Prior to the arrival of the Danes, Sheoraphuli Hat served as a central internal trade hub, maintaining significant commercial connections with various districts of East Bengal (now Bangladesh), including Barisal, Khulna, Dhaka, Mymensingh, and Rajshahi. Between the 14th and 18th centuries, many foreign merchants, such as the French, Portuguese, and Dutch, established trading outposts, known as "Kuthis," to engage in commerce.

=== Urbanisation (1755-1854) ===
The urbanization phase in Serampore commenced with the acquisition of land by the Danes in 1755, as part of the Danish colonial empire in India. In that year, the Danish East India Company dispatched a representative from its Tranquebar office to secure a parwana (royal decree) from Nawab Alivardi Khan, which would permit them to conduct business in Bengal. They obtained this right and acquired three villages – Sripur, Akna, and Serampore – from the Nawab by agreeing to pay an annual rent of 1601 sicca rupees to the local Zamindar. For their new factory and port, the Danes secured three bighas of land at Sripur on the riverfront and an additional fifty-seven bighas at Akna, with governance overseen from Tranquebar. By 1770, Danish merchants were achieving notable progress in regional trade and commerce. This prosperity was further aided by the effective administration of Colonel Ole Bie, who became Serampore's first Crown Regent in 1776.

The Danes additionally established a bazaar, which is today known as Tin Bazaar, and permitted the maintenance of private godowns (warehouses). The town gradually flourished, becoming elegant and prosperous, attracting both foreign and indigenous merchants to settle there. Initially, the Danes relied on their factors for acquiring commodities, particularly silk and cotton fabrics. Over time, they became directly involved in collecting merchandise from producers and incentivized artisans with earnest money for high-quality goods. They also developed a class of trading middlemen, including agents, banias, mutsuddis, and stevedores.

The Hundi business (money lending and banking) was another significant source of Danish income. Colonel Ole Bie, the Danish Governor, aimed to develop Serampore into an attractive tourist destination. Under his patronage, the town became well-protected with a robust system for maintaining law and order. A new Court House was constructed for municipal, administrative, and judicial functions, a metalled road was laid along the riverbank, and grand palatial buildings were erected. The local civil administration operated through a 'Village Committee,' serving as a prototype of a municipality, with Ole Bie as its Governor. The flourishing period of Danish overseas trade largely coincided with Ole Bie's tenure as Head of the factory, from 1776 to 1805, with minor interruptions.

Local textile businessmen, Sobharam Basak and Anandaram Dhoba, were appointed as the first Danish factors. Nandlal Chakravarty served as their initial agent, later promoted to "Dewan." Patitpaban Ray from Katulpur (Bankura) and Safali Ram Dey were engaged as agents for supplying Saltpetre. Brothers Raghuram Goswami and Raghavram Goswami migrated from Patuli to Serampore seeking opportunity; Raghuram secured a position at the Danish Governor's commissariat, while Raghavram became the factory's official moneylender. Together, they accumulated substantial wealth, acquired extensive lands, and established the Serampore Rajbari on Serampore's western side for their family, whose descendants still reside there. To encourage weavers in Akna and Mohanpur villages, the Danes provided advances for cotton and fine silk products. The merchants also set up their own factory for producing fine cloths. They collected 'Hammer' and 'Luckline' ropes for ships, alongside various other ropes and agricultural goods. They also encouraged cultivators in Pearapur to grow Indigo in addition to paddy rice, with Mr. Princep acting as their indigo agent.

=== British rule (Post 1845 transition) ===
On 11 October 1845, Serampore was sold to Britain and subsequently integrated into British India, with its original Bengali name officially restored. Following their acquisition, the British focused on improving the town's civic amenities. The earlier 'Village Committee' was transformed into the Serampore Municipality in 1865, which also came to include Rishra and Konnagar. Serampore was also turned into a sub-division of the Hooghly district in 1845.

=== Industrialisation (1854-1947) ===
With significant capital investment from the British, Serampore transitioned from a commercial town into an industrial hub. A pivotal factor in this transformation was the laying of the Railway line from Howrah to Bardhaman in 1854, which brought about substantial changes in the town's social fabric. Between 1866 and 1915, six additional jute mills were established across Rishra, Serampore, and Chandannagar. Local landlords and mill-owners facilitated the habitation of the labor force by developing workers' colonies in "mouzas" such as Mahesh, Akna, and Tarapukur, adjacent to the Ganges. These included colonies like Odia basti, Gayaparabasti, Chhapra Basti, and Telenga Para Basti. The influx of these migrant workers led to a significant population increase in Serampore, from 24,440 to 44,451 between 1872 and 1901. The first jute mill was set up at Rishra in 1855, and the second one opened in Serampore in 1866. Along with jute mills, many other subsidiary factories emerged in the rural and fringe areas of the town.

During this period, various municipal and infrastructural developments took place. In 1914, the Municipality arranged for the supply of filtered potable water. The Town Hall was established in 1927 in memory of Kishori Lal Goswami. A weaving school was founded during the 1930s, which later gained the status of a Textile College, and the municipality began providing electricity in 1938.

After approximately fifty years of British possession, Serampore was greatly influenced by the Bengal Renaissance and a Bengali cultural and nationalist movement. This nationalist spirit significantly impacted many middle-class youths, leading to a decline in foreign investment in industries but a corresponding increase in indigenous investment. The Bangalakshmi Cotton Mill, for instance, was founded reflecting the swadeshi spirit. From the turn of the 20th century, numerous primary schools and educational institutions were established throughout Serampore. Furthermore, descendants of older aristocratic families contributed their residential buildings for benevolent purposes.

=== Educational and Literary Contributions (British Period) ===
The beginning of the 19th century marks a significant period in Serampore's history due to the arrival of four English missionaries: William Carey, Joshua Marshman, Hannah Marshman, and William Ward. These individuals are considered the architects of the Serampore renaissance. Although their primary purpose was to preach Christianity, they dedicated themselves to serving the ailing and distressed, spreading education, initiating social reforms, and contributing to social reconstruction. Hannah Marshman notably established the first Girls' School at Serampore, which received considerable public approval.

An outstanding contribution was the founding of the Serampore Mission Press by Carey in 1800, where wooden Bengali types made by Panchanan Karmakar were installed. Between 1801 and 1832, the Serampore Mission Press printed 212,000 copies of books in 40 different languages. Carey became renowned as the father of Bengali prose. The Mission Press published several key Bengali works, including the Bengali translation of the Bible, Hitopadesha, and Kathopakathan. Additionally, Munshi Ram Basu, a pundit appointed by Carey, produced "Maharaja Pratapadiya Charita" (1802), "Kashidasi Mahabharat" (1802), and "Krittibas Ramayan" (1803). The first issue of the second Bengali daily, "Samachar Darpan" (1818), was released under Carey's editorship. At the same time, the Serampore Mission Press also published the English daily, "A Friend of India" (a precursor to "The Statesman"). Another significant contribution was the establishment of India's first paper mill at Battala, set up by John Clark Marshman (son of Joshua and Hannah Marshman), powered by a steam engine.

In this cultural development, the local inhabitants largely played a passive role, with only a few affluent landlords and businessmen sending their children to the missionaries' academic institutions. Meanwhile, those from lower economic strata sent their children to monitorial schools, which provided basic education. This process led to the emergence of a local gentry with a favorable view toward the missionaries. Serampore was also known for its Sanskrit schools ("Tole") and published journals like 'Gyanarunodaya' (1852), 'Satya Pradip', 'The Evangelist' (1843), 'Arunodaya' (1856), 'Sarbartha Sangraha' (1873), 'Aakhbare Serampore' (1826), 'Bibidha Barta Prakasika' (1875), 'Prakiti Ranjan' (1878) and 'Benga-Bandhu' (1882). Literary figures such as Rev. Lal Behari Dey, M. Tansdend, Narayan Chattaraj Gunanidhi, Kalidas Maitra, and John Robinson were highly active in their literary pursuits. Raja Ram Mohan Roy, considered the first modern man in India, is said to have been born at Chatra in Serampore at his maternal uncle's house, though this remains controversial. Bhaduri Mahasaya, revered as Maharishi Nagendranath Bhaduri, once guided young minds as headmaster of Janai Training High School. Bhaduri Mahasaya was also known as "The Levitating Saint" due to accounts of his levitation during intense pranayama practices, as described by Paramahansa Yogananda in his Autobiography of a Yogi. His elder brother Gopal Ch. Bhaduri's home in Serampore was a cherished haven, where he often stayed and immersed himself in quiet contemplation. Other notable literary figures associated with Serampore include Dinabandhu Mitra (posted as postmaster), Bibhutibhusan Mukhopadhyay (spent childhood there), and poets Amiya Chakraborty and Haraprasad Mitra.

The crowning work of Carey and his two associates was the establishment of Serampore College in 1818. This institution functions both as a university through the Senate of Serampore College (University) and as an individual college. Its founders invested their last resources in constructing its magnificent buildings. It was also the first college in Asia to award a degree.

=== Post independence ===
Following India's independence in 1947, Serampore has developed as a satellite town of Kolkata (formerly Calcutta); however, its urbanization and developmental changes are still in progress. Presently, it stands as one of the most developed urban centers within the main line region of Howrah.

== Geography ==
Cities and towns in the Sreerampur Uttarpara CD Block, Srirampore subdivision, Hooghly district
M: municipal city/town, CT: census town
(Note: Due to the space constraints in the small map, the actual locations in the larger map may vary slightly)

=== Location ===
Serampore is located at 22.75°N 88.34°E. Geographically, Serampore is bordered by Barrackpore to its east (across the Hooghly River).

The area consists of flat alluvial plains, that form a part of the Gangetic Delta. This belt is highly industrialised.

=== Police stations ===
Serampore police station has jurisdiction over Serampore and Baidyabati municipal areas, as well as parts of Sreerampur Uttarpara CD Block. Additionally, the Serampore Women's police station has been established.

=== Urbanisation ===
The Srirampore subdivision is the most urbanized of the subdivisions in Hooghly district. Of its population, 73.13% is urban and 26.88% is rural. The subdivision includes 6 municipalities and 34 census towns, specifically: Dankuni Municipality, Uttarpara Kotrung Municipality, Konnagar Municipality, Rishra Municipality, Serampore Municipality, and Baidyabati Municipality. Among the CD Blocks within the subdivision, Uttarapara Serampore (census towns shown in the map alongside) has 76% urban population. Chanditala I has 42%, Chanditala II has 69% and Jangipara 7% (census towns in the latter three CD Blocks are shown in a separate map). All places marked on the map are linked in the larger full-screen map.

=== Climate ===
Climate data for Serampore
Month	Jan	Feb	Mar	Apr	May	Jun	Jul	Aug	Sep	Oct	Nov	Dec	Year
Mean daily maximum °C (°F)	26 (79)	29 (84)	33 (91)	36 (97)	36 (97)	34 (93)	33 (91)	33 (91)	33 (91)	32 (90)	30 (86)	27 (81)	32 (89)
Mean daily minimum °C (°F)	12 (54)	16 (61)	21 (70)	24 (75)	25 (77)	26 (79)	26 (79)	26 (79)	26 (79)	24 (75)	—	14 (57)	—
Average precipitation mm (inches)	19.2 (0.76)	39.4 (1.55)	38 (1.5)	49.5 (1.95)	132.7 (5.22)	245.9 (9.68)	347.6 (13.69)	322.4 (12.69)	291.2 (11.46)	163.6 (6.44)	27.9 (1.10)	5.7 (0.22)	1,683.1 (66.26)
Source: Serampore Weather

== Demographics ==
Religion in Serampore (2011)
Hinduism	90.23%
Islam	8.63%
Not Stated	0.62%
Christianity	0.25%
Sikhism	0.16%
Others	0.12%

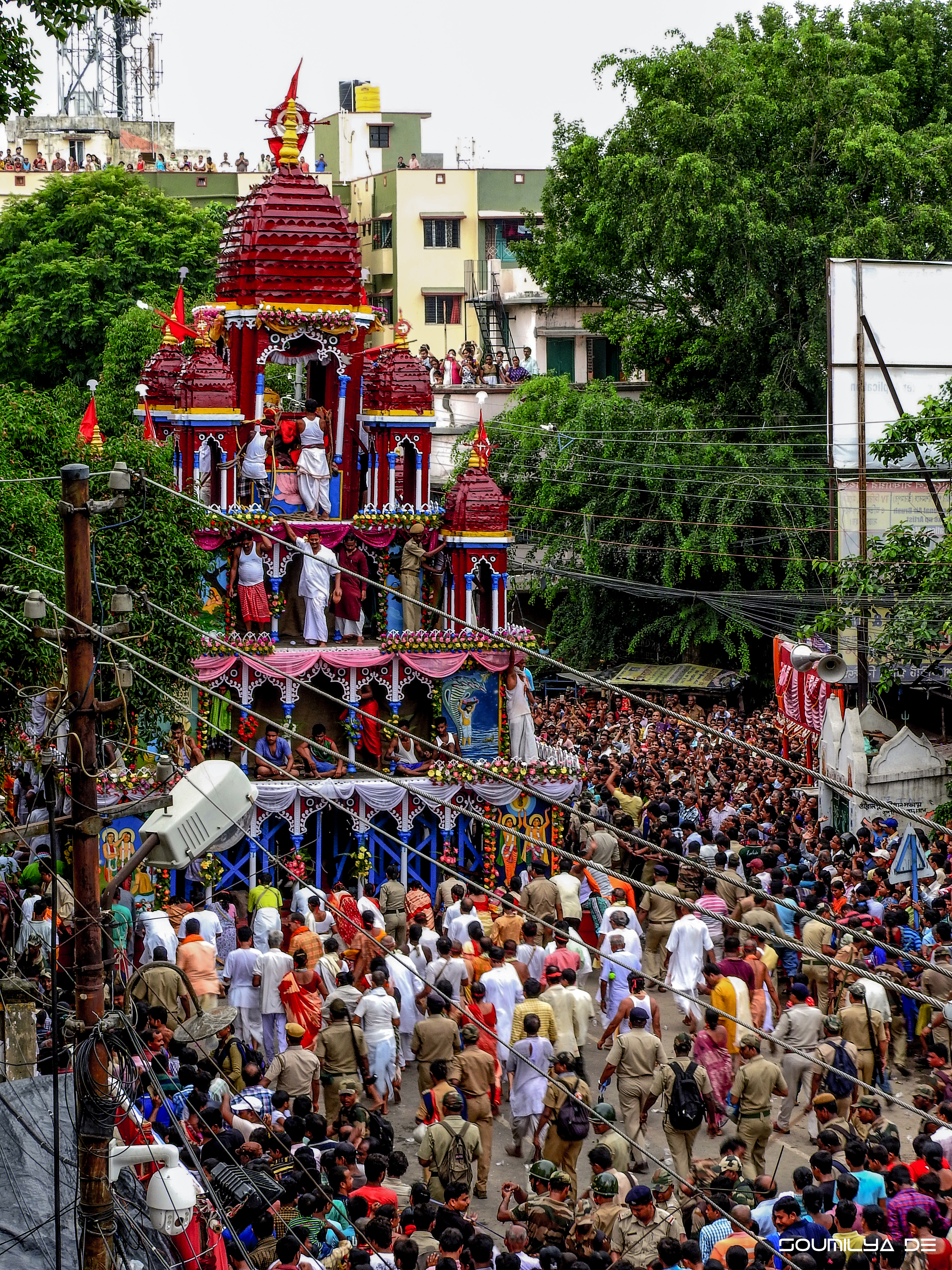
Rathayatra of Mahesh

At the 2011 census, Serampore had a population of 181,842. Of this, males constituted 51.55% and females 48.45%. The city had an average literacy rate of 88.73%, which was higher than the national average of 74.04%. Male literacy stood at 92.75% while female literacy was 87.05%. Around 7% of the population was under 6 years of age. Additionally, Serampore city had 11,998 slums, accommodating a population of 55,441 residents. This constituted approximately 30.49% of the city's total population.

=== Kolkata Urban Agglomeration ===
The following Municipalities and Census Towns in Hooghly district were part of Kolkata Urban Agglomeration in 2011 census: Bansberia (M), Hugli-Chinsurah (M), Bara Khejuria (Out Growth), Shankhanagar (CT), Amodghata (CT), Chak Bansberia (CT), Naldanga (CT), Kodalia (CT), Kulihanda (CT), Simla (CT), Dharmapur (CT), Bhadreswar (M), Champdani (M), Chandannagar (M Corp.), Baidyabati (M), Serampore (M), Rishra (M), Rishra (CT), Bamunari (CT), Dakshin Rajyadharpur (CT), Nabagram Colony (CT), Konnagar (M), Uttarpara Kotrung (M), Raghunathpur (PS-Dankuni) (CT), Kanaipur (CT) and Keota (CT).

=== Languages ===
Languages spoken in Serampore city (2011)
1. Bengali (68.1%)
2. Hindi (24.2%)
3. Urdu (4.20%)
4. Odia (1.30%)
5. Telugu (1.00%)
6. Others (1.23%)

== Transport ==
=== Roadways ===
Serampore is well-connected by road, with State Highway 6 (also known as Grand Trunk Road) passing through the town. It is also in proximity to State Highway 13 (West Bengal) and the Kolkata-Delhi Road. The town's bus service is considered efficient. Several private bus routes operate from Serampore City Bus Terminus. For example, Bus Route 285 connects Serampore to destinations like Salt Lake Sector-5 (as well as New Town and Baidyabati), covering a distance of approximately 45 km. Other routes include those to Chunchura Court – Dakshineswar, Aushbatil, Jangipara, and Birshibpur.

=== Railways ===
The Serampore railway station serves the locality, situated on the important Howrah-Bardhaman main line. This station holds historical significance as India's second railway commenced operations between Howrah and Hooghly on 15 August 1854. The first train's initial halt was Bally, with Serampore being the second stop. The station has 4 platforms and provides basic amenities.

=== Waterways (Ferry Services) ===
Serampore is connected to areas like Barrackpore and Titagarh via ferry services across the Hooghly River/Ganges. Popular ferry ghats include Mahesh Jagannath Ferry Ghat, Ballavpur Radha-Ballav Jiu Ferry Ghat, Juggal Auddy Ferry Ghat, and Chatra Char Poisar Ferry Ghat, connecting to Titagarh and Barrackpore respectively. These services typically operate daily from 6 AM to 10 PM. River cruises on the Hooghly also visit Serampore, highlighting its river connectivity for tourism and transport.

=== Air ===
Serampore is located approximately 25 to 34 kilometers from Netaji Subhas Chandra Bose International Airport (CCU) in Kolkata, depending on the route taken.

== Architecture ==
=== Temples ===
- The Radha-Ballav Temple at Ballavpur
- The temple of Lord Jagannath at Mahesh
- The Rathayatra of Mahesh.
- The Ram-Sita temple, Sripur.
- Gauranga Bati at Chatra (16th century).
- Hari Sabha at Battala.
- Kameshwar Kameshwari Temple at Bhagirathi Lane, Mahesh
- Sashan Kali Mandir at Ballavpur.
- Sitalatala Mandir, Chatra Sitalatala.
- Nistarini Kali Bari, Sheoraphuli Ghat.

=== Mosques ===
- Buro Bibi Mazar at Buro bibi lane.
- Chatra Alamin Siddiquea Masjid at AP Ghosh Rd.
- Gausia Masjid at Arabinda Darano, Chatra.
- Jhautala Mosque, Dharmatala.
- Mullickpara Mosque, Mullickpara.
- Silbagan Mosque.

=== Churches and other religious sites ===
- St. Olav's Church, Tin Bazar.
- Johnnagar Baptist Church, near Serampore College.
- Immaculate Conception Church, MG Road.
- Danish Cemetery, Serampore
- Johnnagar Church, Mahesh.
- Henry Martin's Pagoda, Ballavpur.
- Shree Charan Kamal Gurudwara Sahib at KM Shah Street.

== Education ==
- Serampore College
- Pearl Rosary School - Mahesh ( WBBSE, WBCHSE)
- Government College of Engineering & Textile Technology Serampore
- Serampore Union Institution
- Serampore Girls' College
- Mahesh Sri Ramkrishna Ashram Vidyalaya (Higher Secondary)
- Serampore Girls' High School (Akna Girls' High School)
- Chatra Nandalal Institution
- Serampore Mission Girls High School
- Malina Lahiri Boys' Academy
- Holy Home School
- West Point Academy
- Gospel Home School
- Pearl Rosary School - Mallickpara (West Chatra)
- Kidzee
- Bangla High School
- Ballavpur High School
- Mahesh High School
- Mahesh Banga Vidyalaya
- Ramesh Chandra Girl's High School
- Rajyadharpur Netaji Uchcha Balika Vidyalaya
- Parameshwari Girls' High School
- Nabagram K D Paul Vidyalaya
- Chatra Bani Balika Vidyalaya
- Anjuman.n.c.l.project School
- Aurobindo N.c.l.p School
- Bharati Balika Vidyalaya
- Fatema Girls Jr. High School
- Gopinath Saha Pry. School
- Mission Girls High School
- Nayabasti Sree Shiva Jr High School
- Saraswati.n.c.l.p Special School
- Viswanath Vidyamandir
- Prabash Nagar G.s.f.p.
- Mallickpara Municipal Free Pry

== See also ==
- Rathayatra of Mahesh
- Srerampur (Lok Sabha constituency)
- Sreerampur (Vidhan Sabha constituency)
- Serampore College
- Senate of Serampore College (University)
- Serampore Town Railway Station
- Srirampore subdivision
- Serampore Mission Press
- Hannah Marshman
- William Carey
- Joshua Marshman
- Willam Ward
- Serampore Trio
- Sheoraphuli Raj Debuttar Estate
- Sheoraphuli
- Sheoraphuli railway station
- St. Olav's Church, Serampore
