= Tin Bazar =

- Neighbourhood
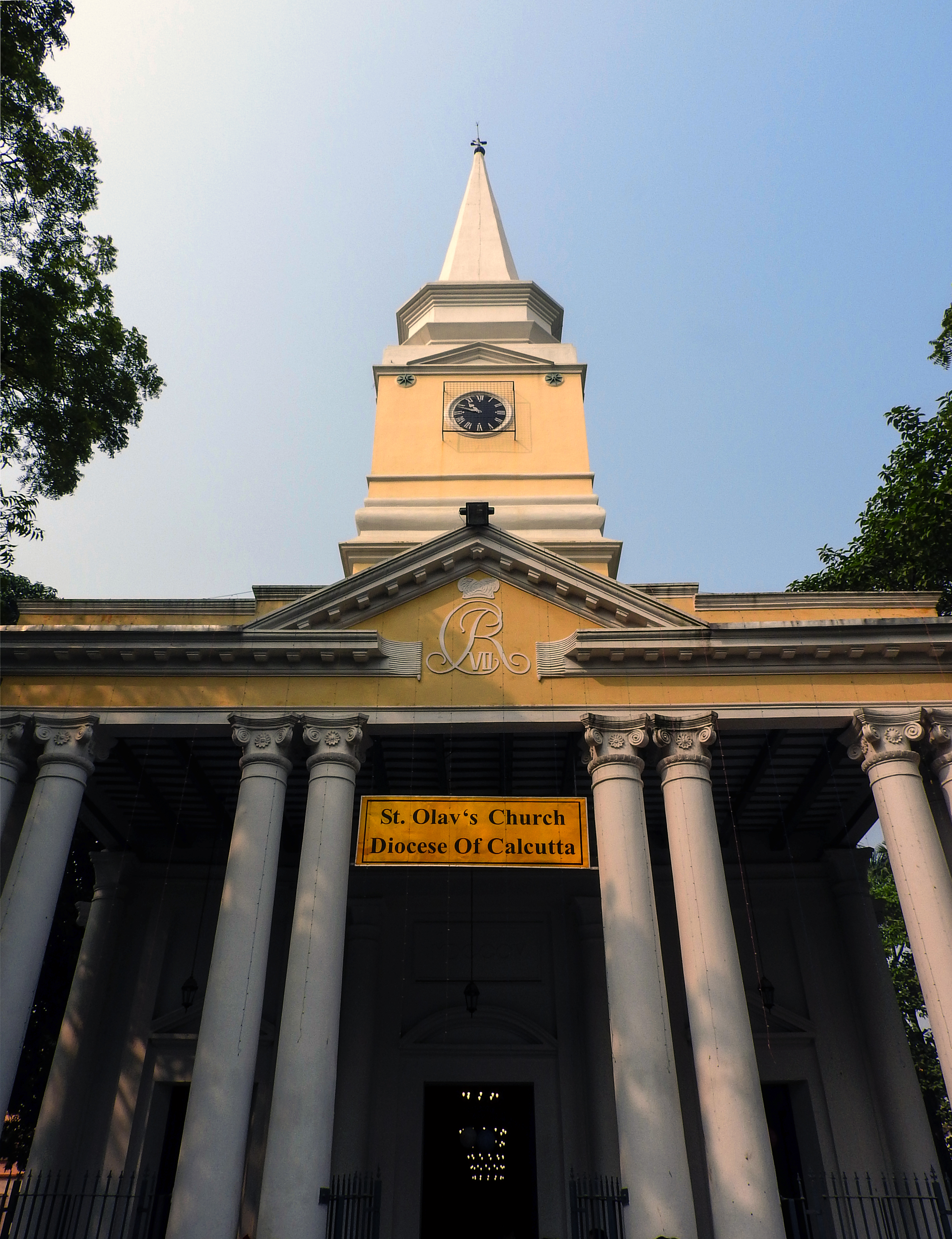
- St. Olav's Church, Tin Bazar

- Location in West Bengal, India Tin Bazar (India)
- Coordinates: 22°45′18″N 88°20′37″E
- Country: India
- State: West Bengal
- City: Serampore
- Municipality: Serampore Municipality
- Ward: 10, 11
- Parliamentary constituency: Srerampur
- Assembly constituency: Sreerampur

Government
  - Member of Legislative Assembly: Dr. Sudipto Roy
  - Municipal Chair Person: Sri. Amiya Mukherjee
  - Member of parliament: Sri. Kalyan Banerjee
- Time zone: UTC+5:30 (IST)
- PIN: 712201
- Area code: 033 XXXX XXXX

Tin Bazar is highly populated and a semi industrial neighbourhood in eastern Serampore of Hooghly district in the Indian state of West Bengal. It is a part of the area covered by Kolkata Metropolitan Development Authority (KMDA).

== See also ==
- Danish India
- Serampore
- St. Olav's Church, Serampore
