= Sheoraphuli Raj Debuttar Estate =

Palace in West Bengal

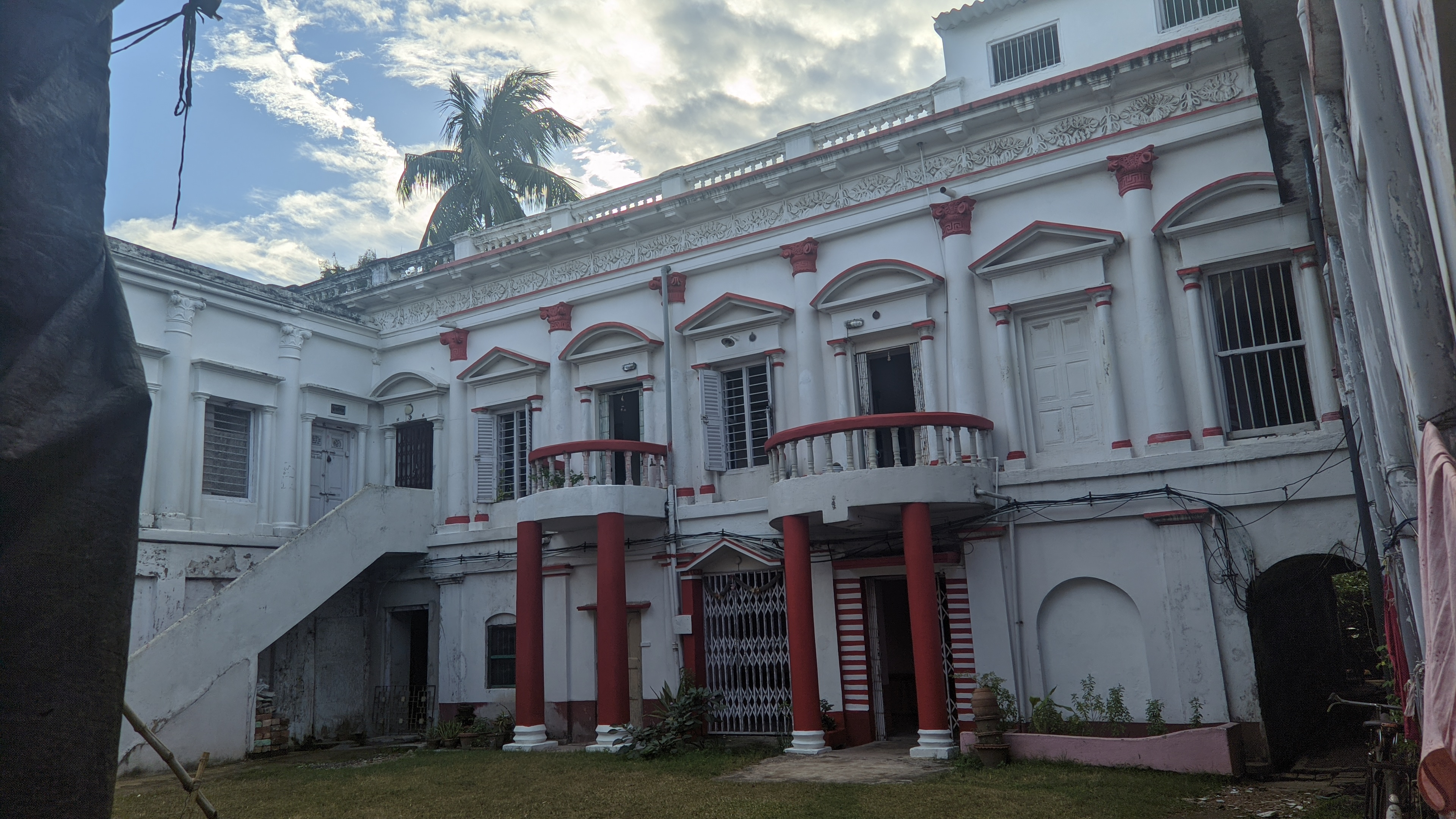
Front portion of the palace in Sheoraphuli

The Sheoraphuli Raj Debuttar Estate or Sheoraphuli Rajbari was part of the Zamindari of the Sheoraphuli Raj, a branch of the erstwhile Patuli Rajbansha which occupies a very high place in the peerage of Bengal. The Calcutta Review for 1845 states the Sheoraphuli family is "descended from one of the most ancient and respected families in Bengal".

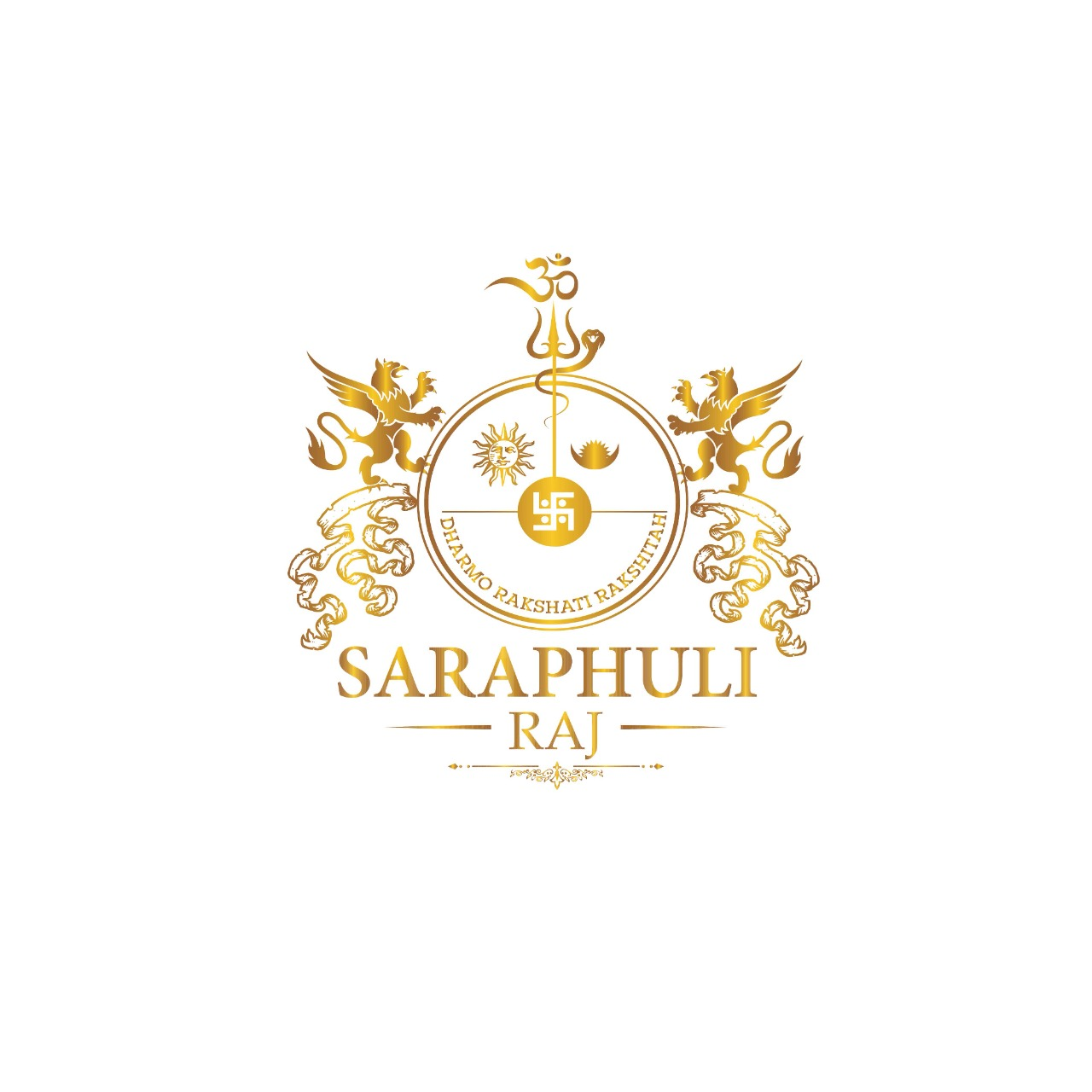
Sheoraphuli Rajbari Crest

Raja Manohar Roy (1718-1743 rule), founder of the Sheoraphuli Raj, was known as the King of Hooghly.

Raja Raghav (grandfather of Manohar Roy) was the abundant ruler 51 Parganas which included an additional 21 Parganas covering 700 square miles, namely Arsha, Haldaha, Mamdanipur, Panjnaur, Boro, Shahapur, Jehanabad, Shaistanagore, Shahanagore, Raipur Kotwali, Paonan, Khosalpore, Moiat, Buxbunder, Havilishahar, Paikan, Mozzaferpore, Hathikanda, Selimpur, Amirabad, and Janglipur. The combined area of these Parganas was approximately 1,564 square miles, and all the Parganas were under the government of Sathgaon.

Sir William Hedges (21 October 1632 – 6 August 1701), the first Governor of the East India Company (EIC) in Bengal, in his diary, describes the vast land ruled by Raja Udaya Roy of Patuli:

"Early in the morning, we passed by a village called Sreenagar, and by 5 o'clock this afternoon, we got as far as Rewee, a small village belonging to Woode Ray, a Jemindar, that owns all the country on that side of the water, almost as far as over against Hugly. It is reported by the country people that he pays more than Twenty Lack of Rupees per annum to the King, rent for what he possesses, and that about 2 years since he presented above a lack of rupees to the Mogul and his favorites, to divert his intention of hunting and hawking in his country, for fear of his tenants being ruined and plundered by the Emperor’s lawless and unruly followers. This is a fine pleasant situation, full of great shady trees, most of them Tamarins, well-stored with peacocks and spotted deer like our fallow-deer: we saw 2 of them near the river side at our first landing"

The Illustrious Hindu Samrat of Bengal Raja Ganesh, Shrila Narottam Thakur, Dinajpur Raj, Hanseshwari Devi's temple lineage, the Bhaglapur Mahashay lineage are some of the renowned individuals or lineages which are connected by blood relations with the Sheoraphuli Raj.

The ancestral residence of the Sheoraphuli Raj family was originally located in Patuli Narayanpur, within the Barddhaman district. The original palace consisted of an estate measuring 80 bighas, The Patuli palace lasted for several generations after which it fell a prey to the ravages of the river. The Bhagirathi gradually encroached upon the spot converting the place into a deep whirling pool of water which is known as the Patuli Daha.

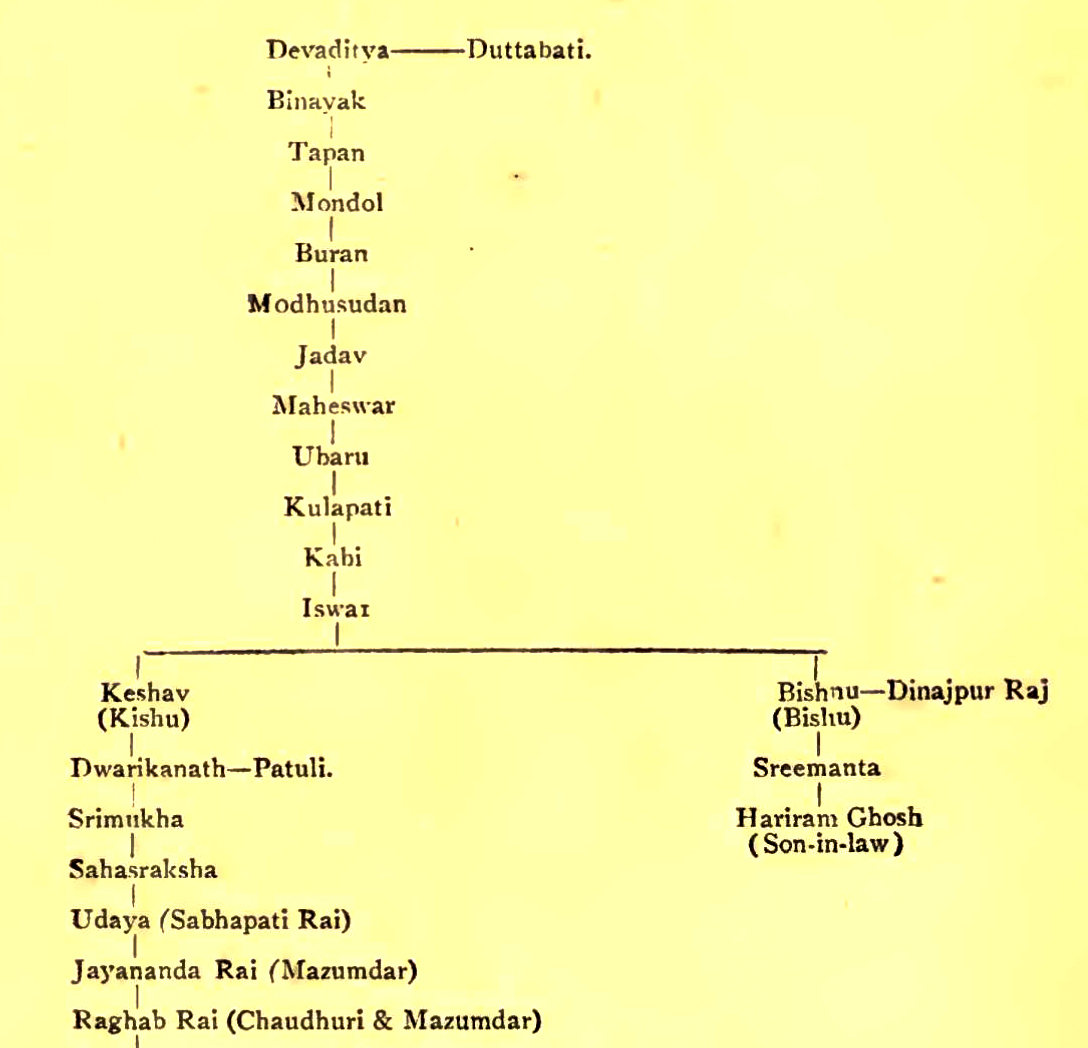
The Generation tree of Sheoraphuli Raj, Debdutta 907 AD (estm.) Of Kannauj till Raja Raghav of Patuli (1710 AD)

The Sheoraphuli "Kshatriya" Rajbansha received great honors from the Mughal emperors. During the reign of Akbar, the Barddhaman Maharaja possessed 10 ani while the Sheoraphuli Raja held 6 ani. Remarkably, when Serampore was under Danish rule as a colony in 1752, the Danes paid taxes to the Sheoraphuli Rajas, recognizing them as the rightful owners of the town.

In 1845, the town of Serampore, comprising 60 Bighas, along with the districts of Akna, and Pearapore were eventually transferred from the King of Denmark to the British, and the treaty ensured that Sheoraphuli Rajbari received an annual sum of 1601 sikkas thereon. Serampore and Sheoraphuli Situated alongside the sacred Ganges river, the town thrived and gained fame for its flourishing trade and commerce, owing to the convergence of three rivers - Ganga, Damodar, and Saraswati.

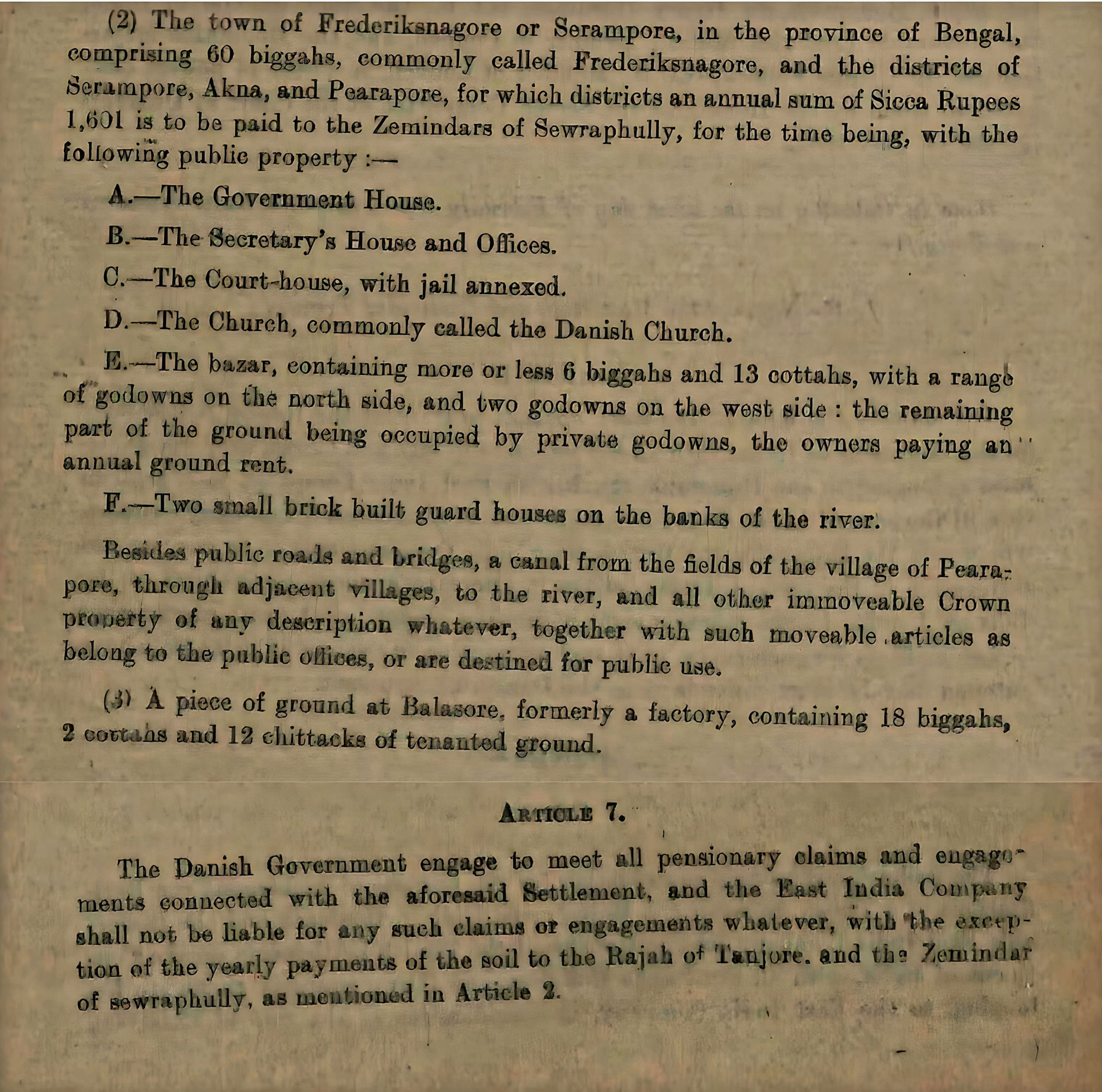
The Treaty signed between Sheoraphuli Raj and the Danish Government in 1845, denotes the payment 1601 Sikkas annually

Chandernagore fell under pargana Muhammad-Aminpur in Hughli Chakla, owned by the Bansberia-Sheoraphuli Zamindars. In 1731, Joseph Francis Dupleix, the new governor, acquired lands from Sheoraphuli zamindars and extended the town from Taldanga in the north to Gourhati in the South.

== History ==
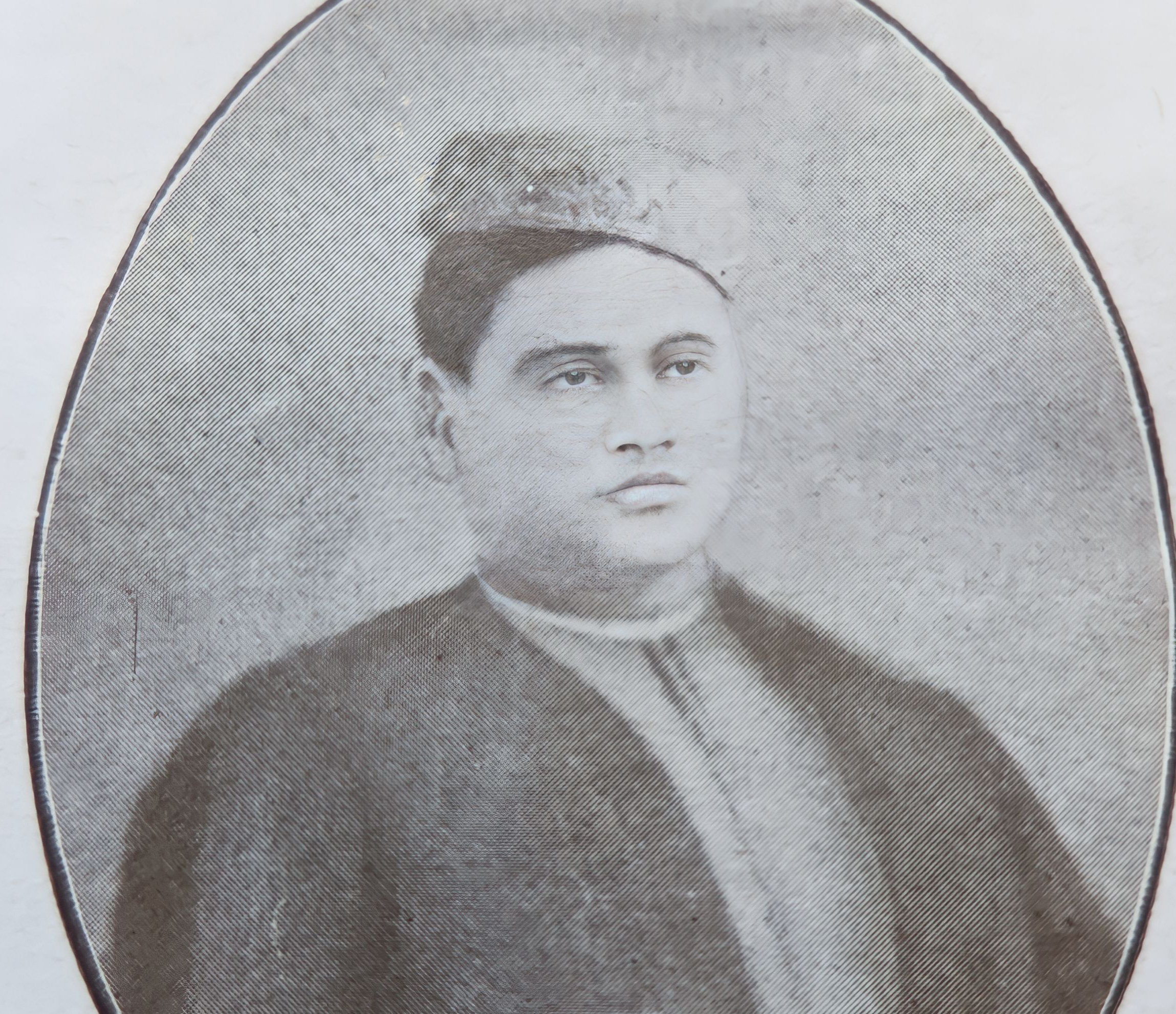
Raja Girindrachandra the first Chairman of Badiyabati Municipality also inspected the construction of Sheoraphuli-Trakeshwar Railline along with Lord Dufferin in 1885

The Patuli Rajbansha holds a prominent position among the Bengal aristocracy. Its historical roots are deeply ingrained, dating back to the era of Adisur, the final ruler of independent Hindu dynasties. The adipurush of the lineage Devaditya Dutt was Uttararhi Kulin Kayastha welcomed in Bengal during King Adisura's reign, 10th Century ad, later his descendant Jadab Dutt (1167 CE ) a remarkable character flourished in the time when Raja Ballal Sen was on the throne of Bengal. It is somewhat curious that this king ascended the throne in the very year in which William of Normandy having defeated and slain Harold took possession of the English throne. This esteemed lineage enjoyed prosperity during the Hindu rule until an unforeseen setback occurred with the advent of the Afghan invasion. Consequently, the family sought refuge in a more secure location, dwelling in obscurity for countless centuries until the emergence of the Mughal empire. Initially residing in Patuli, located in the Burdwan district, the family received a noble distinction from the illustrious Emperor Akbar the Great, who bestowed them with the title of "Roy", an esteemed honor of significant value during that era. However, this title merely foreshadowed the greater honors that awaited them. Following Akbar's passing, the succeeding Emperor Jehangir elevated the status of the Patuli family by granting their leader the prestigious title of Mazumdar, an honor of much higher significance compared to Rai or Zamindar titles. While there were numerous Rais and Zamindars, the Mazumdar title was limited to just four families in all of Bengal, symbolizing its sacred Vedic significance. Among these esteemed four families was Bhabananda, widely regarded as the revered founder of the Nadia Raj.

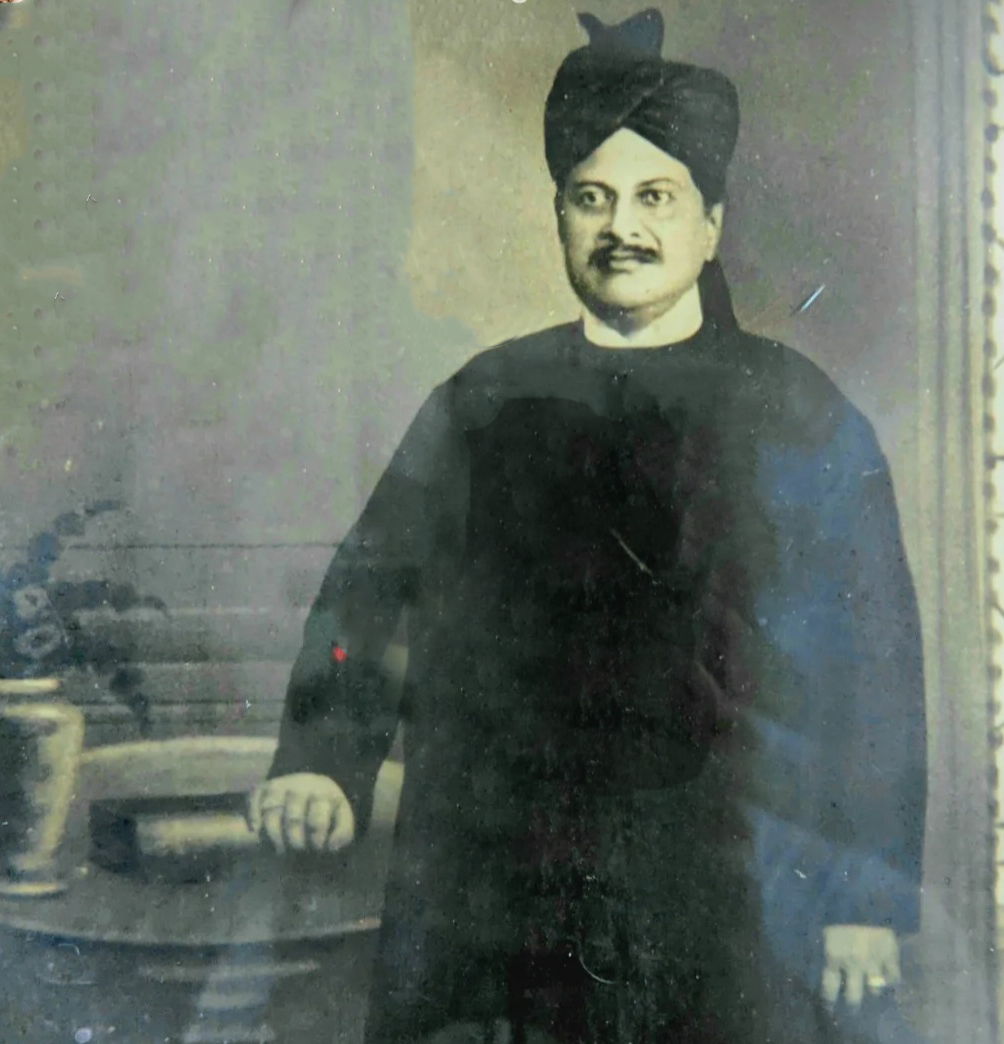
Raja N.C Ghosh Varman of Sheoraphuli Rajbari

Sheoraphuli, once an insignificant village, first rose to importance owing to its being the seat of an influential zamindari family, whose estate was consequently called the Sheoraphuli Raj. Purgana Arsha of Sarkar Satgaon belonged to two Kayasth brothers, Rameswar and his brother Basudeb. Between 1728 and 1749 A.D., a portion of the Pargana comprising strips of land on both banks of the Hooghly river from Hooghly to Calcutta was constituted as a separate zamindari under the name of "Zamindari Kismat Muhammad Aminpur." This was subdivided between the second and third sons of Rameswar and his two nephews.

The second son Mukund got a nine-annas and the third son Ramkrishna a seven-annas share of Muhammad Aminpur. The elder nephew Manohar( Sheoraphuli Raj) got 10 annas and the younger nephew Gangadhar 6 annas of Pargana Boro. The remainder of Painam went to the eldest son of Rameswar, Raghudev, the ancestor of the Bansberia family. Manohar moved to Sheoraphuli and Gangadhar to Bally (Howrah), was succeeded by Durgaprasad, son of the younger son of Manohar, thus founding the ten annas and six annas branches of the Sheoraphuli family.

Raja Manohar Ray established the Rajbari, thereby laying the foundation for the Sheoraphuli Raj family. This marked the inception of the family's illustrious history. Raja Manohar Roy acquired extensive land and constructed several temples, significant among them being the temple dedicated to Goddess Sarbamangala within the palace's premises.

== Raja Manohar Roy ==
Raja Manohar Roy's contributions gained wide recognition, with some comparing them to the great epic Mahabharata. He also donated land and funds for the construction of Mahesh's temple in Shrirampur. The Jagannathpur Mouza was denoted in service of Lord Jagannath by Raja himself.

Nawab Moorshed Kuli Khan employed certain gruesome methods in which he exacted the public revenue from unwilling Zemindars which were too well known to need recounting. On some occasions, he caused them to be dragged through a pond filled with ordure, a contrivance for obtaining the Government dues, It happened so that a Brahman Zemindar had thus fallen into arrears and was about to be consigned to this gruesome torture, when Manohar Roy, the Zemindar of Patuli, stepped forward and paid off the whole debt. The Nabab was so much gratified with this act of generosity that he conferred on him an invaluable jewel, which the family has retained for centuries. For several generations, they vindicated their claim to this distinction by their liberal donations to various shrines, and it is said that few temples of any note can be found in the country that have not received some tokens of their devotion and bounty.

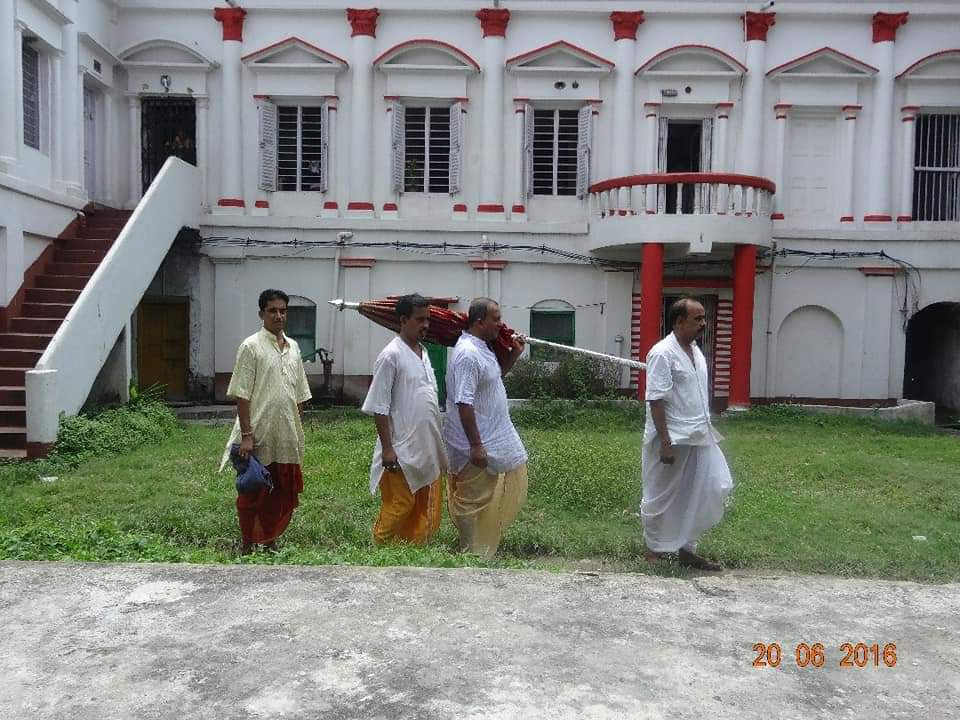
Raj Pujaris along with the Silver Umbrella headed towards Mahesh Jagannath Dev's snan Jatra

Raja Manohar roy was honored with the title of "Kshatriya Raj" during the Vajpeya Yagya organized by Nawadipadhipati Raja Krisnachadra.

The contemporary Nawabs of Bengal were greatly influenced by Raja Manohar Ray's philanthropic activities and temple constructions, leading them to donate significant land and wealth to him.

== Raja Harish Chandra Roy ==
Among the descendants of Raja Manohar, the best-known was Harish Chandra Roy, who flourished in the beginning of the 19th century. The great hat at Sheoraphuli owes its origin to him. He specially patronized the worship of Jagannath at Mahesh(Serampore). Raja Harishchandra on Horseback carried a 10 feet Silver Umbrella along with a 5 feet Silver Staff, as an age-old tradition of holding the umbrella on the deity Lord Jagannath with the staff held in high esteem before the rituals of the Snan jatra begins, it is followed till this day with much reverence.

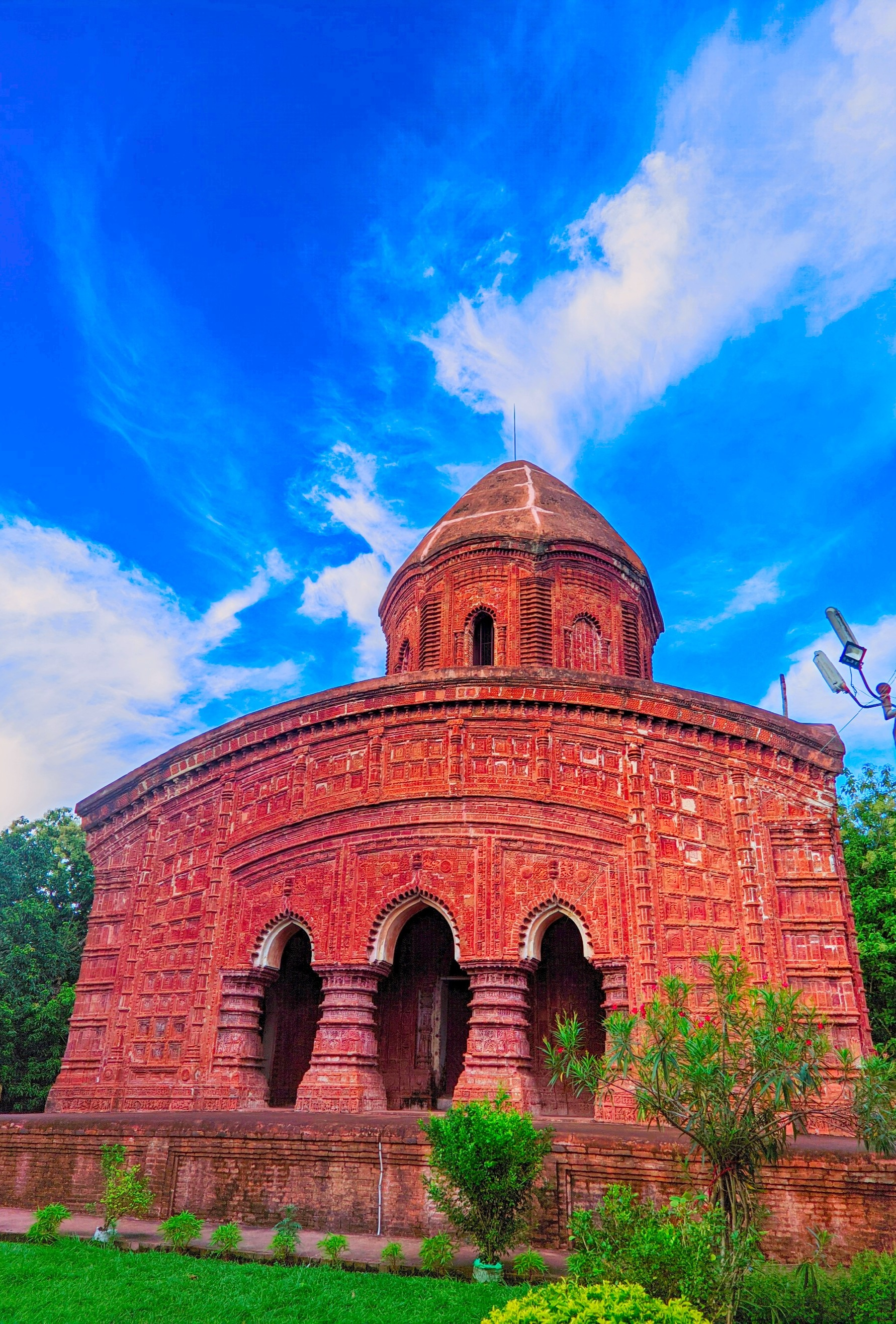
Shri Ramchandra Mandir in Guptipara built by Raja Manohar Roy of Sheoraphuli Raj

Raja Raj Chandra Roy, also known as Jotey Raja (the king with dreadlocks), Zamindar of Sheoraphuli built the temple of Ram-Sita at Sripur (Serampore) in 1752. He resided in the Rajbari of Sheoraphuli, which also served as his temporary residence apart from his abode in Patuli. His third son Raja Harischandra left Patuli for Sheoraphuli, which served as their permanent dwelling thereafter. After him the Zamindari was demarcated into the 'Barataraf' and the 'Chototaraf' which has been retained.

Later on Zamindar Nirmal Chandra Ghosh (Barataraf) and his descendants of the Raj Parivar continue to reside in the Rajbari. The Saraphuli Raj Debuttar has been traditionally renowned for the policy of self-effacement.

== Shri Rama Temples in Hooghly ==
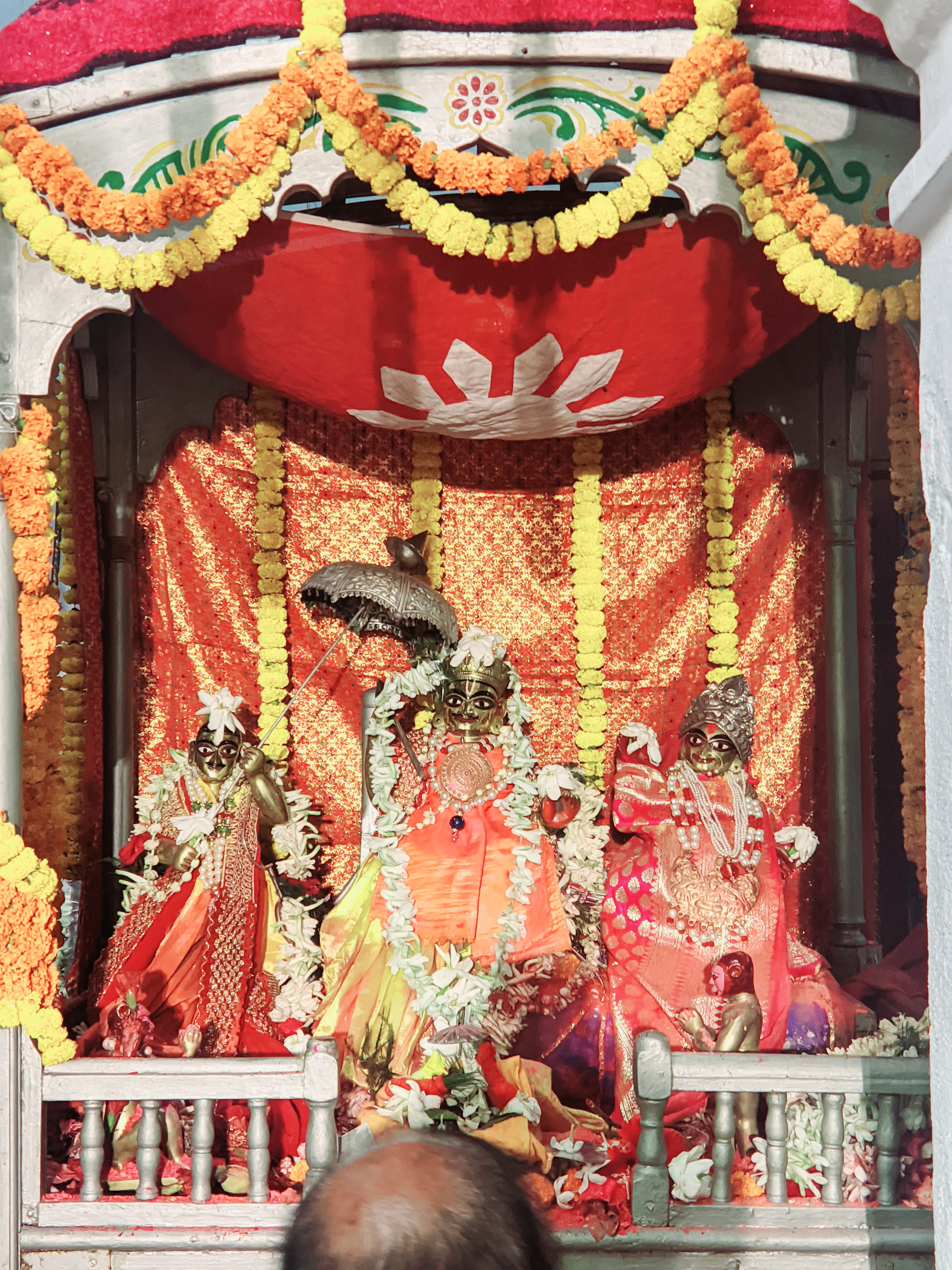
Sri Ram Chandra of Serampore

Ram temple, Srirampore :- Sheorafuli king Rajchandra Ray built the temple in 1752(1667). It is said that the king received SHRI RAM's instruction to build a temple in a dream. He was said to have been sleeping in a boat then. He donated 3 villages – Sripur, Mohanpur, Gopinathpur for Dev seva. Later those three villages together came to be known as Srirampore. That's how the town got its name from Srirampore.

Ram temple, Uttarpara :- Sheorafuli king Rajchandra Ray built this temple too however seven years later after Srirampore temple. At first vigrahas of Shri Rama, Ma Sita, Lakshmana, Bharat, Satrughna, Mahavir Hanuman were being worshipped. Later, temple was extended and vigrahas of Gaur-Nitai was installed. Then, temple was extended some time after that and this time Shyam Ray & Radhika was installed that time.

Rama temple, Chuchura :- This temple is situated in the 19 no ward of the Chuchura municipality. This vigraha too is credited to Sheorafuli royal family. So, it seems Sheoraphuli royals established many Rama temples. They were Shaktas however, they also established many Kalika & Durga temples. Despite construction of so many temples they avoided any kind of publicity.

Rama temple, Guptipara :- This temple is known for its exquisite terracotta art. According to 1951 district gazetteer it was built in the end of 18th century by Sheoraphuli Harish Chandra Ray. Harish Chandra is the son of Raj Chandra Ray(he built two Rama-Sita temples) and grandson of Manohar Ray. The common knowledge is that this temple was constructed in 1822. However, Baneshwar Vidyalankar in his Citra Champu (written in 1744) and Bijayram Sen in his ‘Tirtha-Mangal’ (1770) have mentioned Rama temple in Guptipara.Raja Manohar Ray died in 1743 & Baneshwar mentions

“সপ্তগ্রামসমীপধাম পরমং শ্রীগুপ্তপল্লীতি চ যচ্ছ্রী বৃন্দাবনচন্দ্রনন্দিতমপি শ্রীরামচন্দ্রজ্জ্বোলম”

So, it is more likely King Manohar Ray built the temple.

The vigraha is far more older however. It is a 400 years old vigraha. A Rama sadhak called Ramkanta went to Ayodhya for pilgrimage purpose and he received a Shaligram shila by the grace of divine. After coming back he established a temple on the bank of Bhagirathi which got wiped out in flood later. That Rama vigraha is being worshipped in Guptipara temple now.

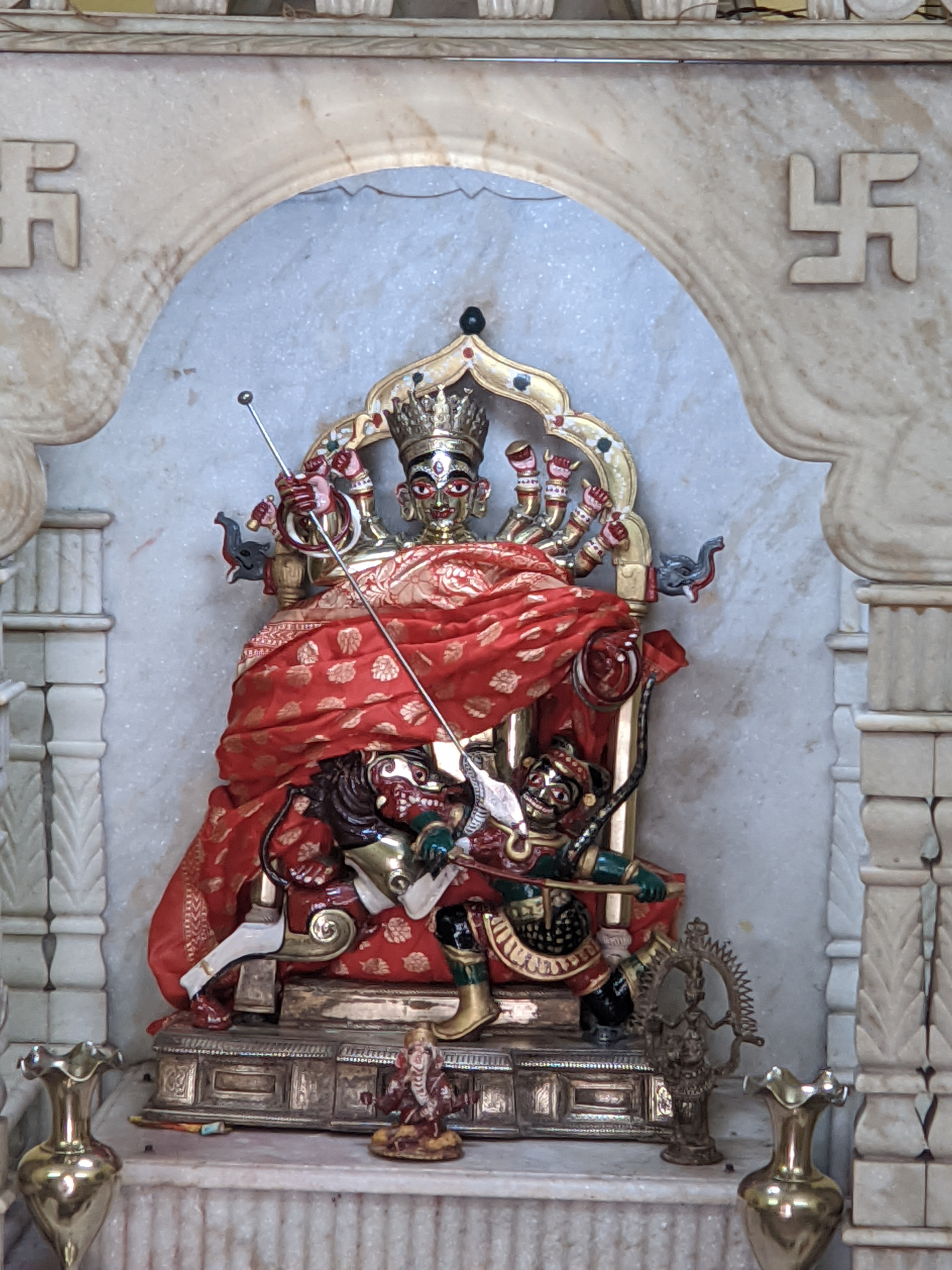
Ma Sarbamangala Devi

=== The Sarvamangala Devi Temple ===
Sarvamangala Devi Temple of the Raj Debuttar Estate is a center of attraction in and around the area most notably during the occasion of Durga Puja. Devotees from various places gather for the Arati. The Puja is also a special occasion for gatherings of family members of the Raj Parivar. The "Kumari Puja" during the 'Mahaashtami' is a special and prominent phase during the Rajbari Durga Puja. The temple is also an abode for the Govindahari-Radhika murti and the family deities Shree Shree Lakshmi Janardan Thakur.

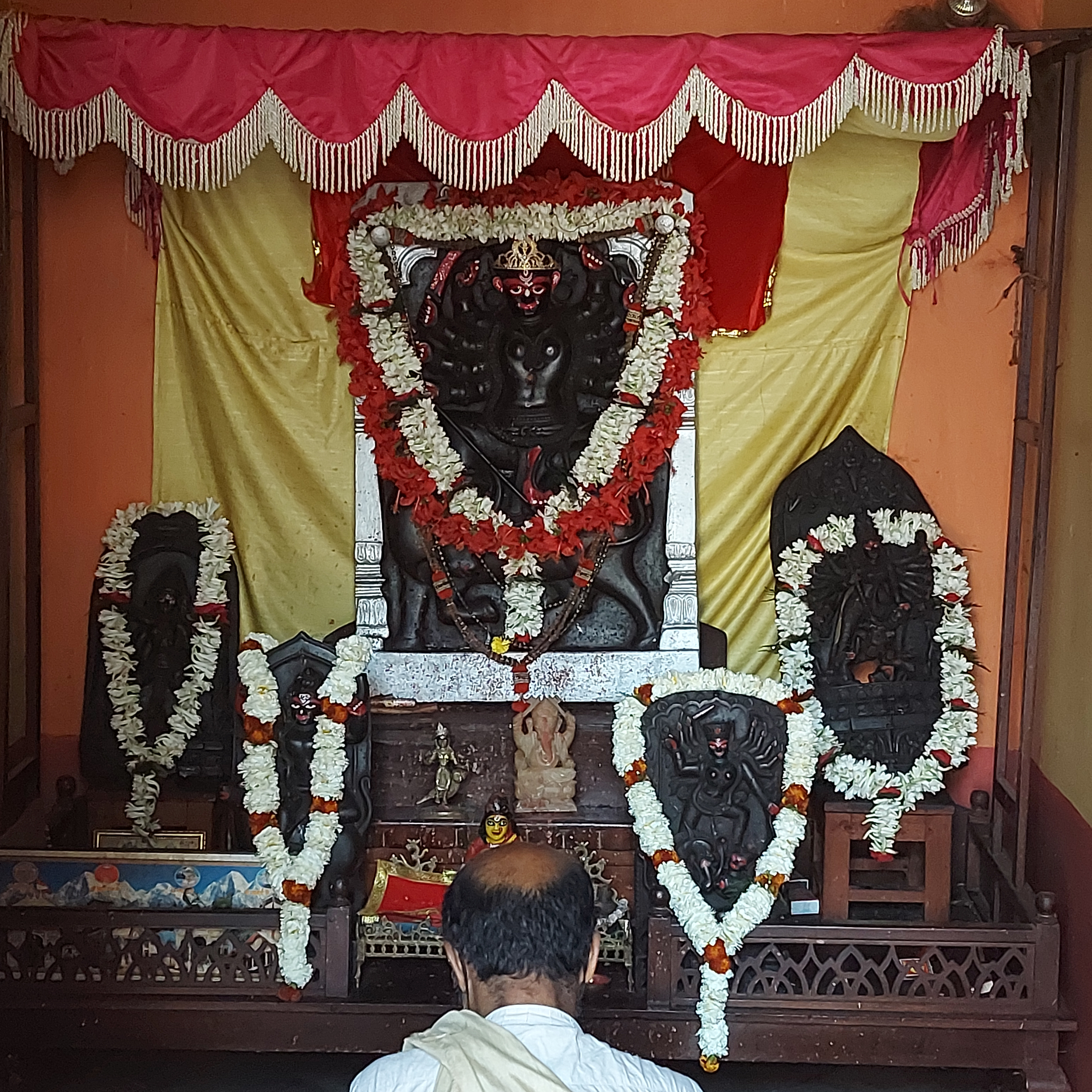
Ma Mahishmardini one of the oldest deities of the family.

The Rajbari Durga Puja reached its 280th year in 2012. The Asthadhaatu murti of Devi Sarvamangala is said to have been excavated from below ground, after a vision appeared before Raja Manohar Roy in his dream from a pond in the village of Aatishara. In 1147 Bengali era or 1734 AD, he erected the temple and made substantial donations of land and funds for its maintenance, as well as engaging in various philanthropic endeavors. The temple and the Durga Puja has a rich history and is looked after by the Raj Debuttar Trust. The trust was formed by the members of the Raj Parivar to ensure timely temple renovations and maintenance.

=== Mahesh Jagannath Mandir ===
The initial temple construction and to facilitate the service and management of Lord Shri Jagannath deb, King Manohar Roy directed the establishment of a village named Jagannathpur as an endowment property. As part of the pilgrimage, the royal family, along with other devotees, offered their obeisance to Lord Shri Shri Jagannath Deb. His descendant Raja Harish Chandra rode to the shrine with half a dozen outriders and a long array of followers; and the annual ceremony of bathing Lord Jagannath was postponed till he arrived and issued orders for its performance.

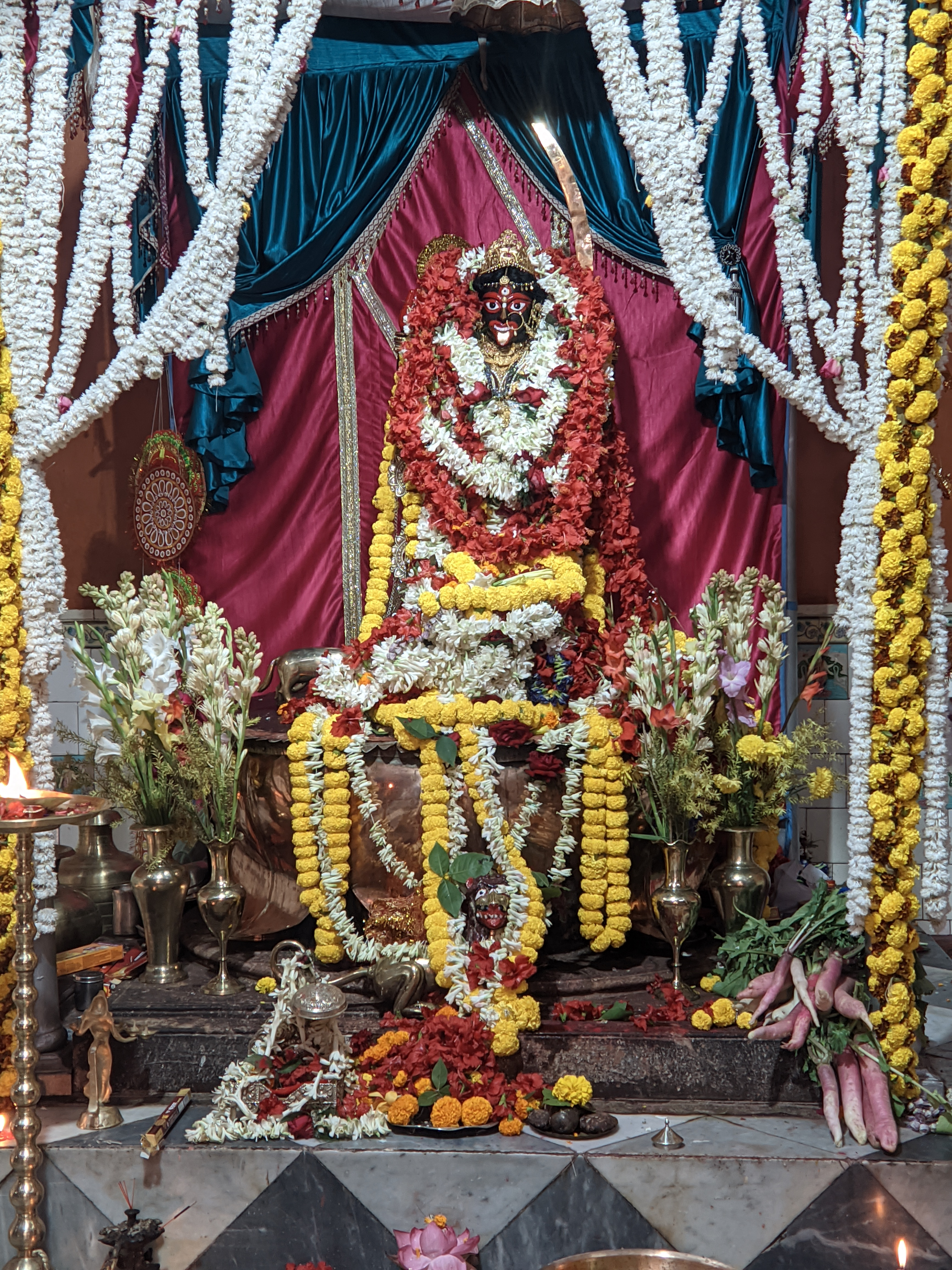
Ma Nistarini of Sheoraphulli

=== Ma Nistarini Mandir ===
On the banks of the Ganga in Sheoraphuli, a temple was erected of Dakshina Kali in the year 1827 by King Harishchandra. The goddess is enshrined on the sacred Panchamundi seat. A prominent feature of the deity is the sword she holds, which carries the enduring legacy of the royal family. Sarvamangala, the first queen of King Harishchandra, holds a special place in the temple's folklore. Legend has it that the king transformed her into a divine goddess within the temple premises.

=== Sheoraphuli Hat ===
The Sheoraphuli Hat established in 1827 by Raja Harishchandra of Sheoraphuli entirely by his own merit soon became the biggest market and trade center not only in undivided Bengal but across the length of eastern India. Though the largest trading center in Bengal before the foundation of Kolkata, the hat currently stands third in terms of trading volume after Bara Bazar and Sealdah Hat.

Jute, betel leaves, rice, paddy, and vegetables were the main trade items in this market. The "Seorafulir Hat" within Baidyabati Municipality is distinguished by its unique architecture, vastness, and vibrant trade. This market was established in the year 1827. Every Saturday and Tuesday, a fascinating transformation took place as local vendors and farmers set up their stalls and platforms. While boats and carts used to come here in the past, significant changes occurred with the arrival of the railway line until 1885. This brought about a remarkable shift in the market's appearance. The Sheoraphuli Hat's distinctive pumpkin, were quite famous and used to find its place in the Royal feasts of England, were each quite heavy, weighing around 1/2 maunds(18 kg). The market primarily dealt in jute, betel leaves, rice, paddy, and vegetables. The morning market attracts around 50 to 60 thousand people, filling the area with life. The Hat, holds historical significance. Dinbondhu Mir's poem "Dinbondhu Mirar Shurdhuni" references Seodaful Hat and its relocation by King Harischandra. Even during that time, there were larger markets. Despite legal troubles, pilferage, and tumultuous times, this market stands resilient, maintaining its aura.
