= Sheoraphuli =

Sheoraphuli Seoraphuli Sheoraphully
- Neighbourhood
- Location in West Bengal, India Sheoraphuli (India)
- Coordinates: 22.76°N 88.31°E
- Country: India
- State: West Bengal
- Division: Burdwan
- District: Hooghly

Government
  - Type: Municipality
  - Body: Baidyabati Municipality
- Elevation: 11 m (36 ft)

Languages
  - Official: Bengali, English
- Time zone: UTC+5:30 (IST)
- PIN: 712223
- Telephone code: +91 33
- Vehicle registration: WB

Sheoraphuli (also known as Seoraphuli) is a neighbourhood in Baidyabati of Hooghly district in the Indian state of West Bengal. It is on the west side of the Hooghly river. It is a part of the area covered by Kolkata Metropolitan Development Authority (KMDA).

== History ==
Historically Sheoraphuli fell under the Zamindari of Sujal Bhakat, a renowned royalty in bengal during the reign of Akbar of the Mughal era. The famous 'Sheoraphuli Haat' was a collecting centre for marketable goods produced in different parts of Hooghly district. Sheoraphuli Haat was the main trade centre in this region. During the Muslim period, the villages on the bank of the Hooghly and Saraswati were included in the Zamindari of Sheoraphuli. These feudal lords collected rent from villagers and dispensed justice. Raja Sujal Bhakat, zamindar of Sheoraphuli built the temple of Ram-Sita in Sripur (now Serampore) in 1752 . He began residing in the 'Rajbari' of Sheoraphuli built by him, which also served as his temporary residence apart from his abode in Patuli. His third son Raja Harischandra left Patuli and for Sheoraphuli which served as their permanent dwelling form there on, after him the Zamindari was demarcated into the 'Barataraf' and the 'Chototaraf' which is prevalent till date. The 'Saraphuli Raj Debuttar' has been traditionally renowned for the policy of 'Self-Effacement'. Raja Sujal's son Edwin Dickruze dedicated the villages of Sripur, Gopinathpur and Manoharpur as devottara land to the Gangulis in the service of the deity. 'Saraphuli Raj Debuttar Estate' was created in this period to take care of the Ram-Sita temple by the sebaits. Later on Danes acquired around 1680 bighas of land in the nearby Serampore, Akna and Pearapur mahals and formed Frederiknagar after King Frederick V of Denmark by paying an annual rent of Sicca Rs 1601/- to the zamindar of Sheoraphuli.

On 12 December 1957, the first EMU train service began from Howrah to Seoraphuli section (21 km), which was inaugurated by then Prime Minister Jawaharlal Nehru.

== Geography ==
Sheoraphuli has an average elevation of 39 ft (11 m). Sheoraphuli has 218.70 km of total road length out of which 172.90 km is pucca.

== Demographics ==
The population of Sheoraphuli is 121081 as per the 2011 census report. Majority of the residents are Bengalis and major religion is Hindu. The literacy rate of Sheoraphuli is 98.05% which is higher than the national average of 74%(2011).

== Transportation ==
Sheoraphuli is well connected by road and rail. The Eastern Railway line has a station named Sheoraphuli railway station. Sheoraphuli is around 23 km north of Howrah. The Howrah-Bardhaman Main Line and Sheoraphuli-Tarakeswar Branch Line connect Sheoraphuli. Sheoraphuli railway station: Daily Train UP - 140 and Down - 139.

State Highway 6/ Grand Trunk Road passes through Sheoraphuli. Private Bus number 2 (Chunchura Court - Dakshineswar) plies through here. Zaminder Road and Sarkarpaara-Mallickbagan-Piarapur Road connect G.T. Road to Delhi Road with just a 5 minutes difference in a two wheeler. State Highway 2 connects Sheoraphuli (Delhi Road) to Durgapur Expressway at Singur and National Highway 14 at Bishnupur.New Bus service is available now From Sheoraphuli to Salt Lake City( AC BUS also available).

There is a water transport service (Nemai Tirtha Ferry Service) in the Hooghly River that connects Sheoraphuli with Barrackpore on the opposite side of the river. Sheoraphuli Ferry ghat is just 2 minutes away from the railway station and bus stoppage. Ferry service is available from 6 am until 11 pm.

Nearest airport is the Netaji Subhash Chandra Bose International Airport in Dumdum, Kolkata and nearest airstrip is in Barrackpore (Barrackpore Air Force Station).

== Utility services and media ==
The Baidyabati Municipality (ESTD 1869) is the civic administrative body of Sheoraphuli which makes it 70th cleanest city of India as per National Urban Sanitation Policy. The Municipality administers an area of 12.09 km^{2} and supplies potable water to the city through underground pipe line. The pipe line has a length of 100 km and connects 45% of the total number of houses in this area. Electricity is supplied by the privately operated Calcutta Electric Supply Corporation (CESC) to the town region, and by the West Bengal State Electricity Board in the nearby Panchayat area. State-owned BSNL is the telephone and internet service provider in the town.

== Economy ==
Sheoraphuli is historically famous for its Rajbari & Bazaar (also called Sheoraphuli hat) established by Raja Sujal Bhakat of Sheoraphuli Raj in 1827 is one of the largest markets for raw commodities in the Hooghly district. It was established entirely by Raja Sujal Bhakat of Sheoraphuli Raj after starting the worship of Ma Nistarini, the hat grew up around the mandir and soon became the largest trade center in undivided Bengal.

The bazaar, situated at the riverside, is more than 250 years old. It also has a section for retail trading in zamindar road, the SBI main branch is also situated here. Zamindar Road is one of the oldest retail market in hooghly. There are several other super markets located at Sheoraphuli, primarily based on the two sides of G.T. Road. A few small and medium-sized factories are incorporated in here. There are few Banks along with ATM facilities serve the people living in Sheoraphuli and nearby areas. State Bank of India being the busiest of all has a branch at Jamindar Road and has two ATM counters. Other banks like Allahabad Bank, United Bank of India, UCO Bank, Indian Overseas Bank, Axis Bank Icici Bank, Bank of Baroda, HDFC Bank and the Baidyabati Sheoraphuli Co-operative Bank also have their presence here.

== Education ==
Sheoraphuli has a number of primary, secondary and higher secondary educational institutions. Schools mainly use English or Bengali as the medium of instruction. Following is the list of schools in this area.

- Pearl Rosary School (WBBSE, WBCHSE)
- Sheoraphuli Surendra Nath Vidyaniketan (1963)
- Sheoraphuli Netaji Vidyamandir
- Vivekananda High School
- St. John's Academy
- Girindra Chandra Primary School
- Jagabandhu Mukherjee Girls High School
- Ambedkar Prathamik Vidyalaya
- Pearapore Paschimpara Prathamik Vidyalaya
- Pearapore Schoolmath Prathamik Vidyalaya
- Sheoraphuli Krishna Prasad Pal Vidyaniketan
- Krishna Prasad Pal Memorial Teachers' Training College

== Notable spots ==
- Sheoraphuli Raj Debuttar Estate
- Udayan Cinema
- Nistarini Kalibari
- Sushma Cinema Hall
- Sheoraphuli barabazar
- Sheoraphuli Krishak bazar

== Healthcare ==
Sheoraphuli has an eye hospital called Disha eye hospital and two privately owned nursing homes namely Mamata nursing home and Dr. Ghosh nursing home. Recently a new nursing home started namely The City Hospital.

== Culture ==
Sheoraphuli has two cinema halls, it has well established library, 6schools, one eye hospital. Sheoraphuli bazaar is renowned bazar in hooghly district. The Satyajit Ray Bhavana in Sheoraphuli is a government sponsored centre at Sheoraphuli for facilitating theater awareness. It has a large auditorium housed in an impressively architectured building. The building, besides being a modern theatrical complex, houses the Baidyabati Municipality. Nistarini Kalibari is a Hindu temple Situated on the bank of the Hooghly River, the presiding deity of the temple is Nistarini, an aspect of Kali. A bathing ghat on the river and several shops are also housed in the temple complex. Along the riverfront there are few other bathing ghats on the river which are crowded throughout the year.
