= Ananta Basudeba Temple =

Hindu temple in Bansberia

Ananta Basudeba temple
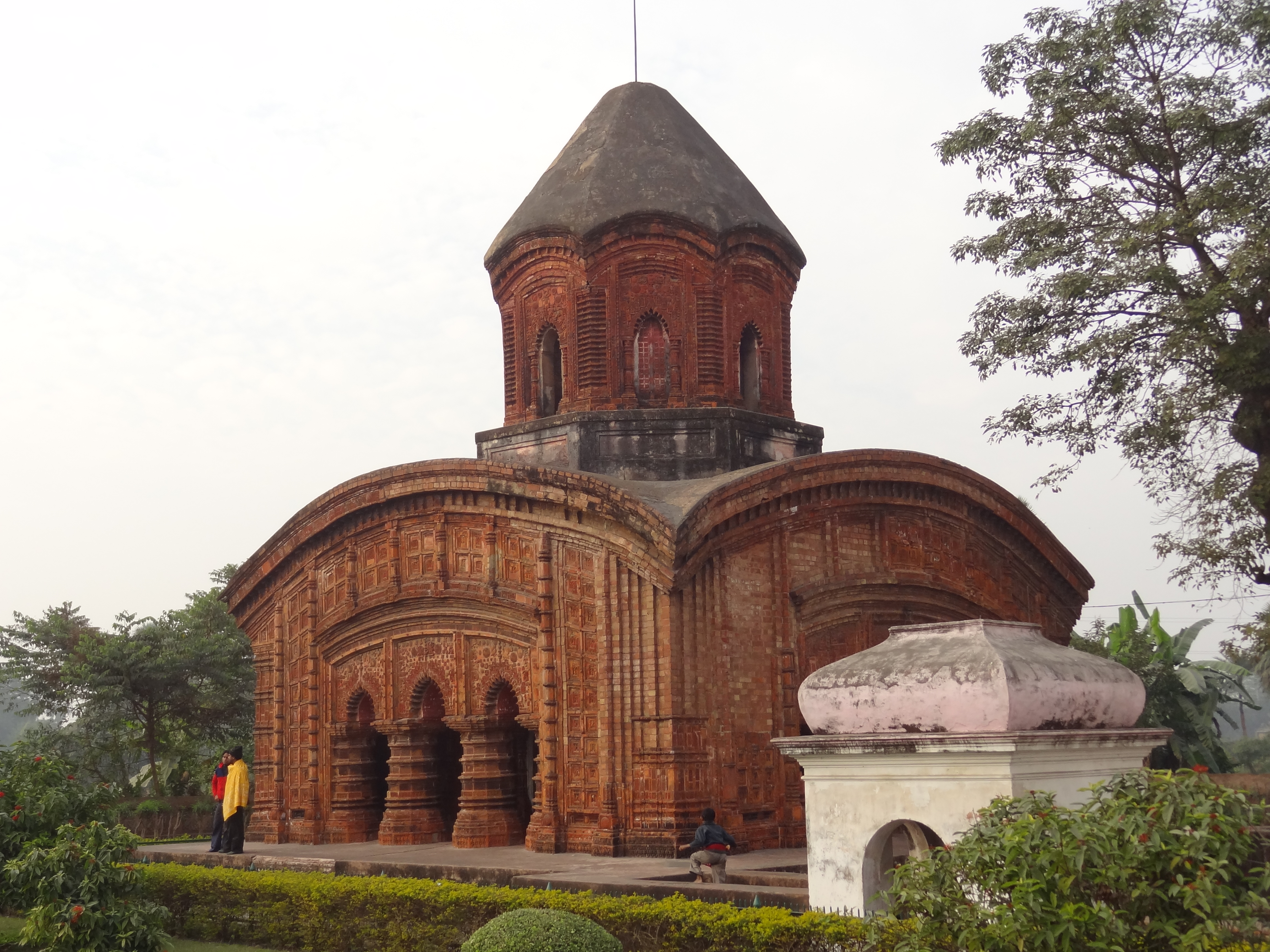

- Location in West Bengal

Religion
- Affiliation: Hinduism
- District: Hooghly District
- Deity: Lord Krishna

Location
- Location: Hangseshwari temple complex in Banshberia
- State: West Bengal
- Country: India
- Interactive map of Ananta Basudeba temple
- Coordinates: 22°57′52″N 88°23′59″E

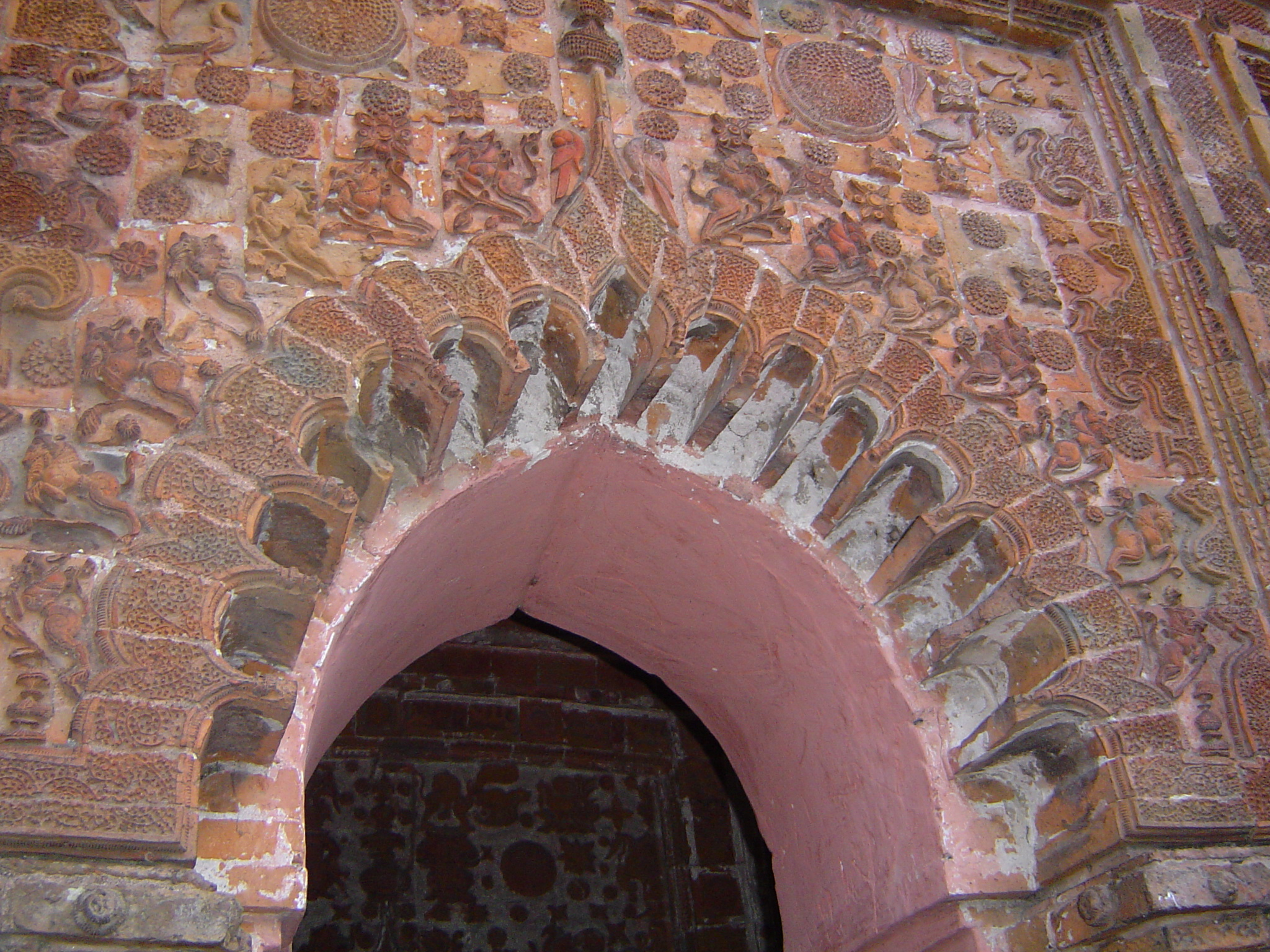
Terra cotta works on the wall of the temple

Ananta Basudeba temple is a Hindu temple of Lord Krishna in the Hangseshwari temple complex in Banshberia, in the Hooghly District in the Indian state of West Bengal. Built by Raja Rameswar Datta in 1679, this temple is noted for the exquisite terra cotta works on its walls. It is built in the traditional eka-ratna style, with curved cornices. The tower on top of the temple is octagonal. The terracota works depict stories from the great Indian epics Ramayana and Mahabharata, as well as from lilas of Krishna.
