= Hangseshwari Temple =

Hindu temple in Bansberia

Hangseshwari temple
- হংসেশ্বরী মন্দির
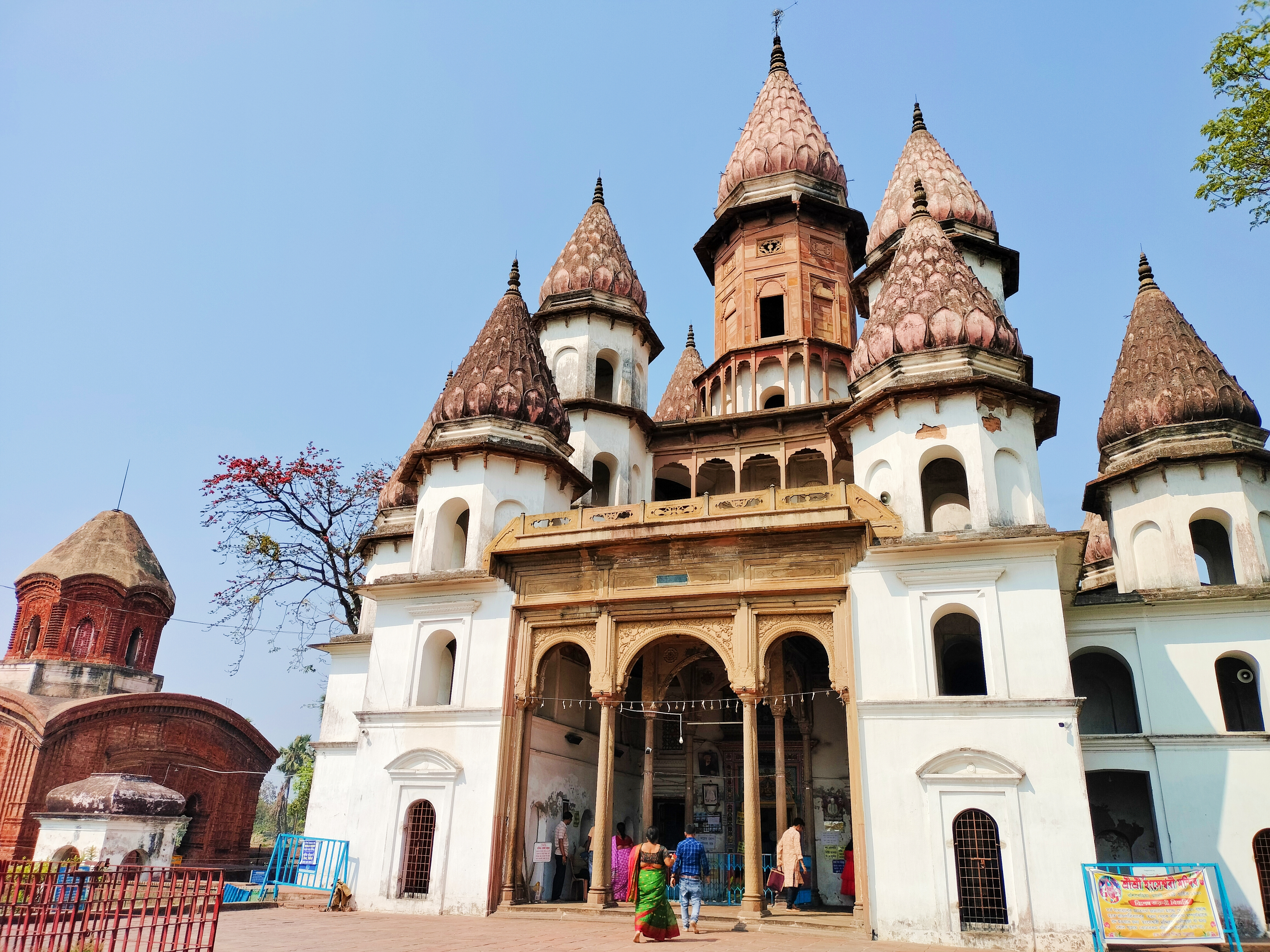

- Location within West Bengal Location within India

Religion
- Affiliation: Hinduism
- District: Hooghly District
- Deity: Hangseshwari, a form of adi parashakti jagatjanani Kali
- Festival: Kali Puja

Location
- Location: Bansberia, Hooghly District
- State: West Bengal
- Country: India
- Interactive map of Hangseshwari temple
- Coordinates: 22°57′51.55″N 88°23′59.31″E

Architecture
- Type: Bengal temple architecture
- Style: Unique architecture with 13 minars or Ratnas
- Founder: Raja Nrisinhadeb Roy
- Creator: Rani Sankari
- Completed: 1814; 212 years ago

Specifications
- Direction of façade: South faced
- Height (max): 70 m (230 ft)

The Hangseswari temple (also spelled as Hanseswari temple) is a Hindu ratna temple located in the town of Bansberia at Hooghly District, West Bengal, India. The presiding deity of the temple is Hangseswari, a form of Maa Adi Parashakti Jagatjanani Dakshina Kali in Hindu mythology. In December 1799, Raja Nrisinhadeb Roy Mahasay laid the foundation stone of this temple. But after completion of the second storey in 1802, the founder died leaving this far-famed temple incomplete. His second wife Rani Sankari completed the rest of the work in 1814. The temple is known for its unique ratna architecture.

Bansberia is an industrial town positioned in between Bandel and Tribeni. Rani Hanseswari was the mother of Raja Nrisingha Deb Roy, hence the deity is worshipped as Maa Hanseswari. The deity is worshipped as a form of Maa Kali in Hindu mythology. The temple complex has another temple — Ananta Basudeba temple — besides the main temple. Also near is the Swanbhaba Kali temple built by Raja Nrisinha Deb Roy Mahasay in 1788. The Hanseswari temple has a distinctive architecture different from the usual pattern present in this area, consisting 13 minars or Ratnas, each built as a blooming lotus bud. The inner structure of the building resembles human anatomy. It was started by Raja Nrisingha Deb Roy Mahasay and later completed by his widow wife Rani Sankari in 1814.

The architecture of the temples is the representation of "Tantrik Satchakrabhed". The structure tells about the structure of a human body, because the five storied temple is like the five parts of the human body, namely, Bajraksha, Ira, Chitrini, Pingala and Sushumna.

== Gallery ==
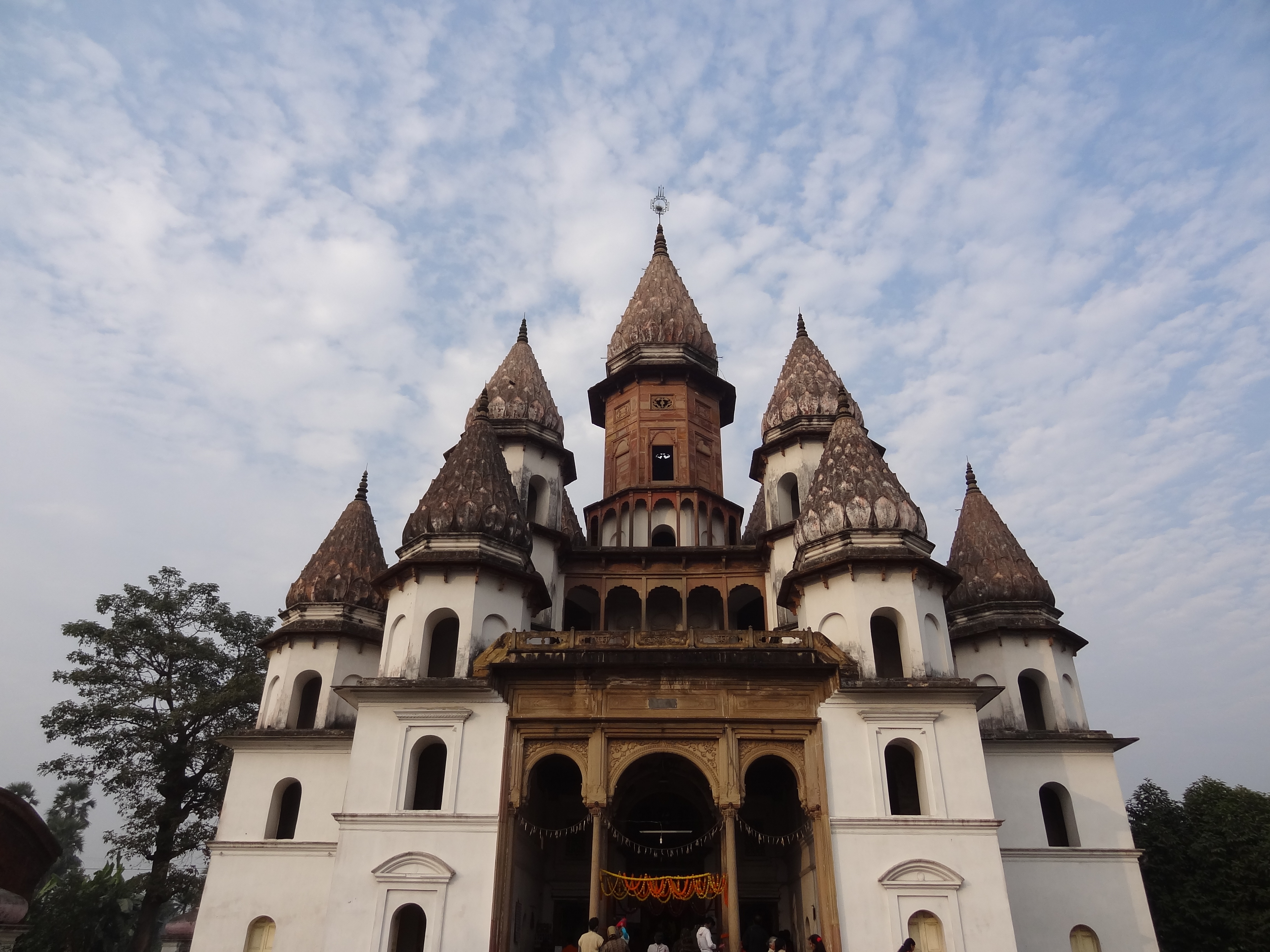
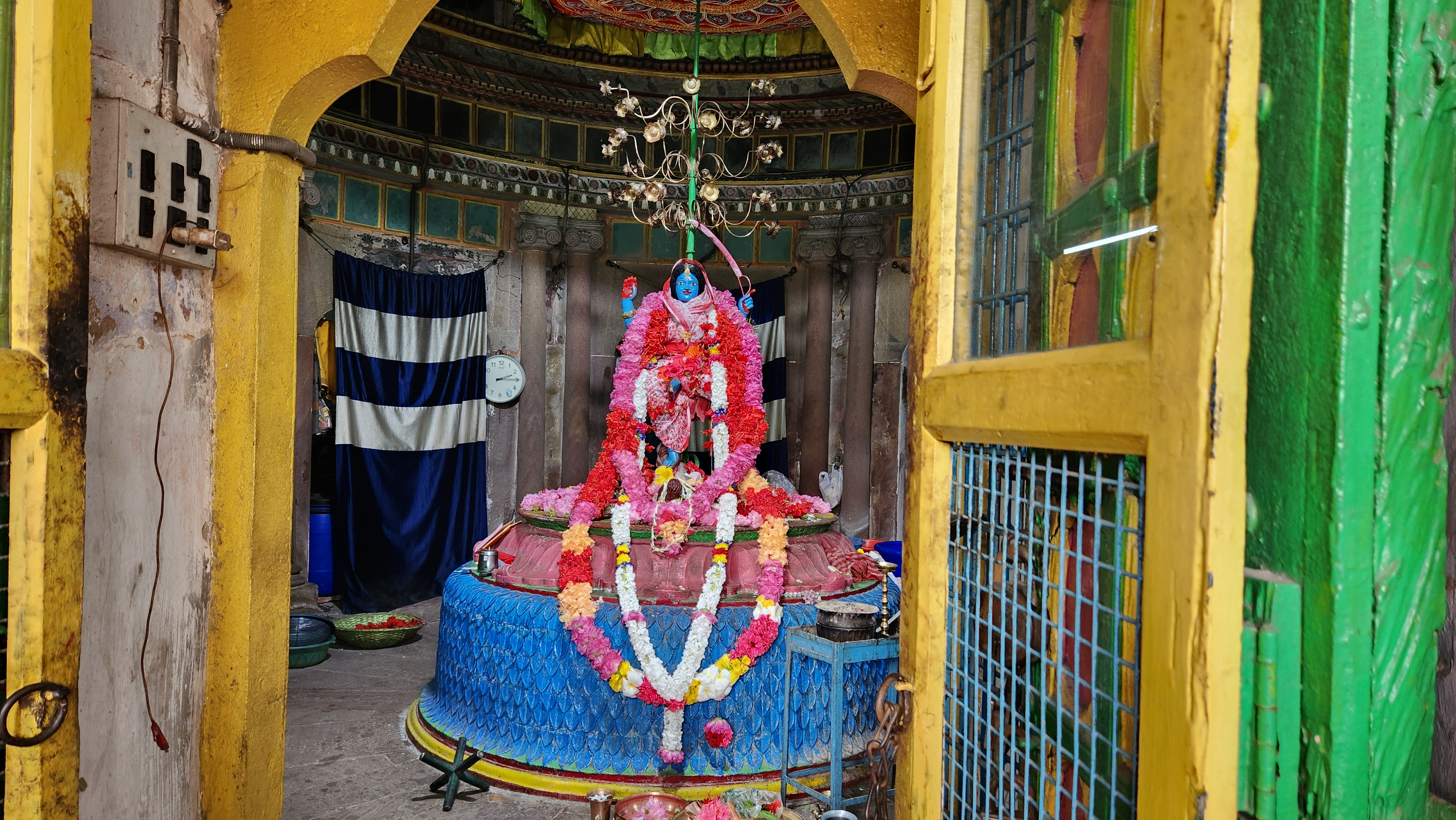
Main Idol of Goddess Hangseshwari inside the temple
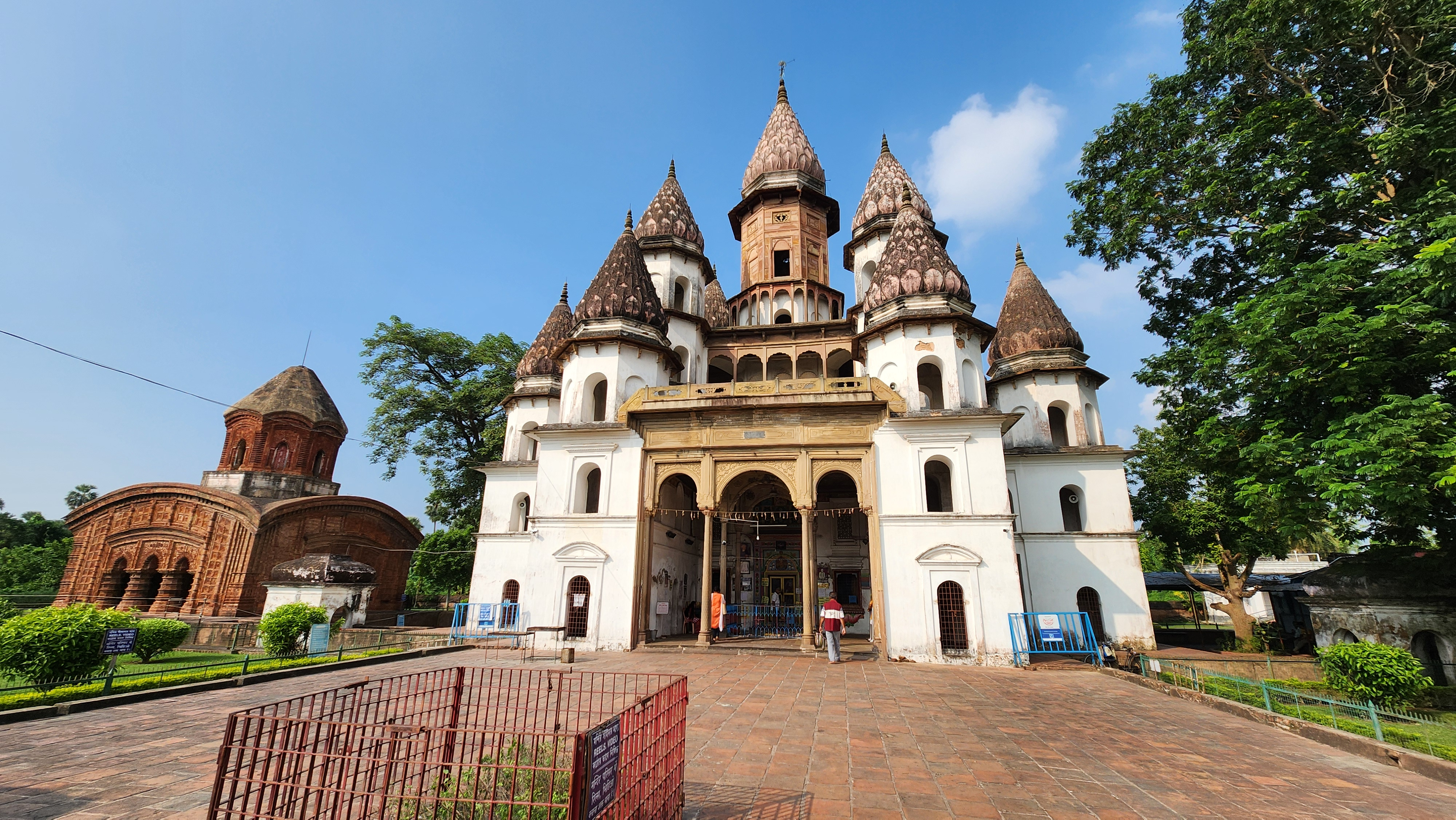
Hangseshwari Temple Ground
Hangseshwari Temple

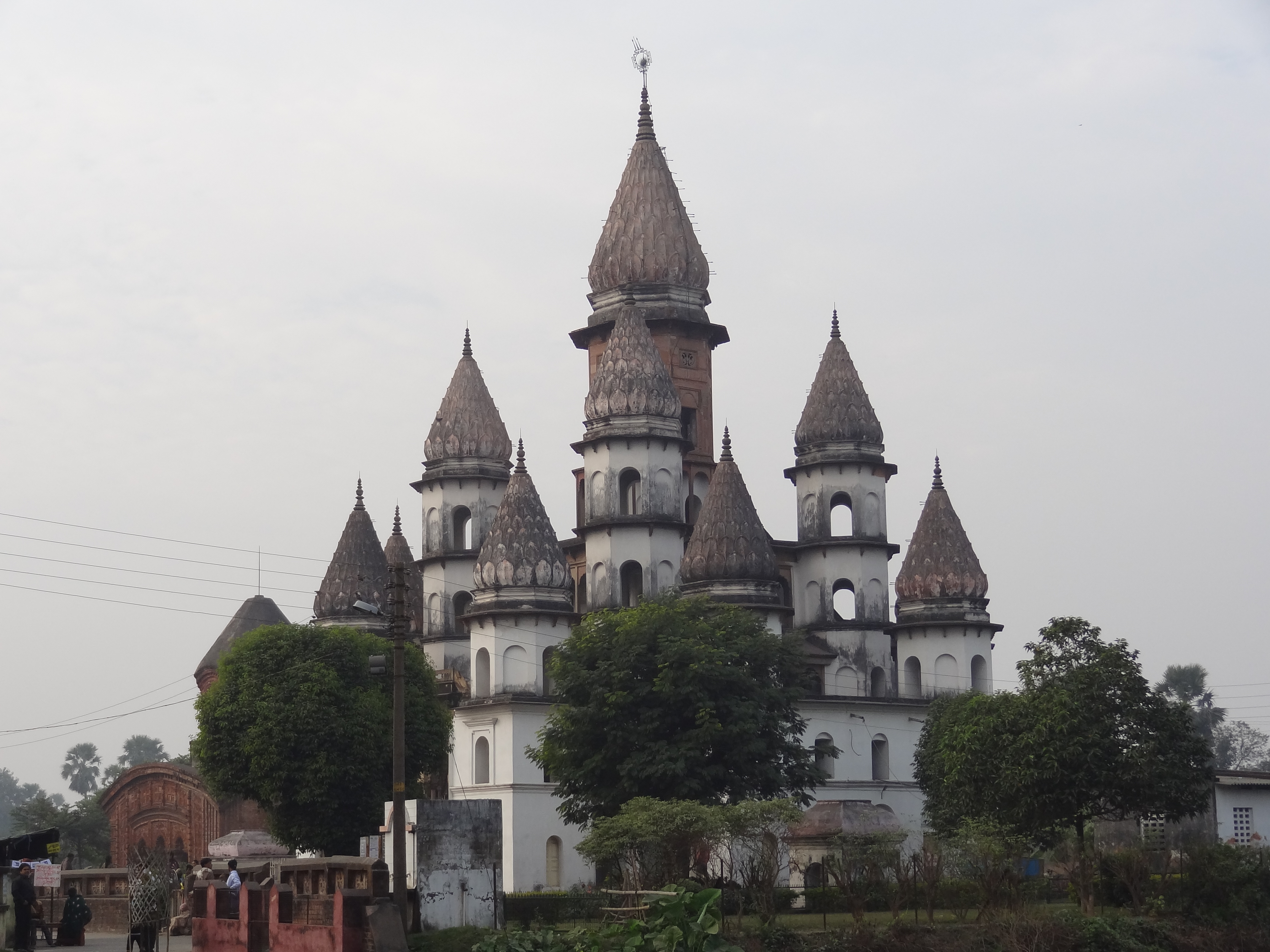
Hangseshwari Temple

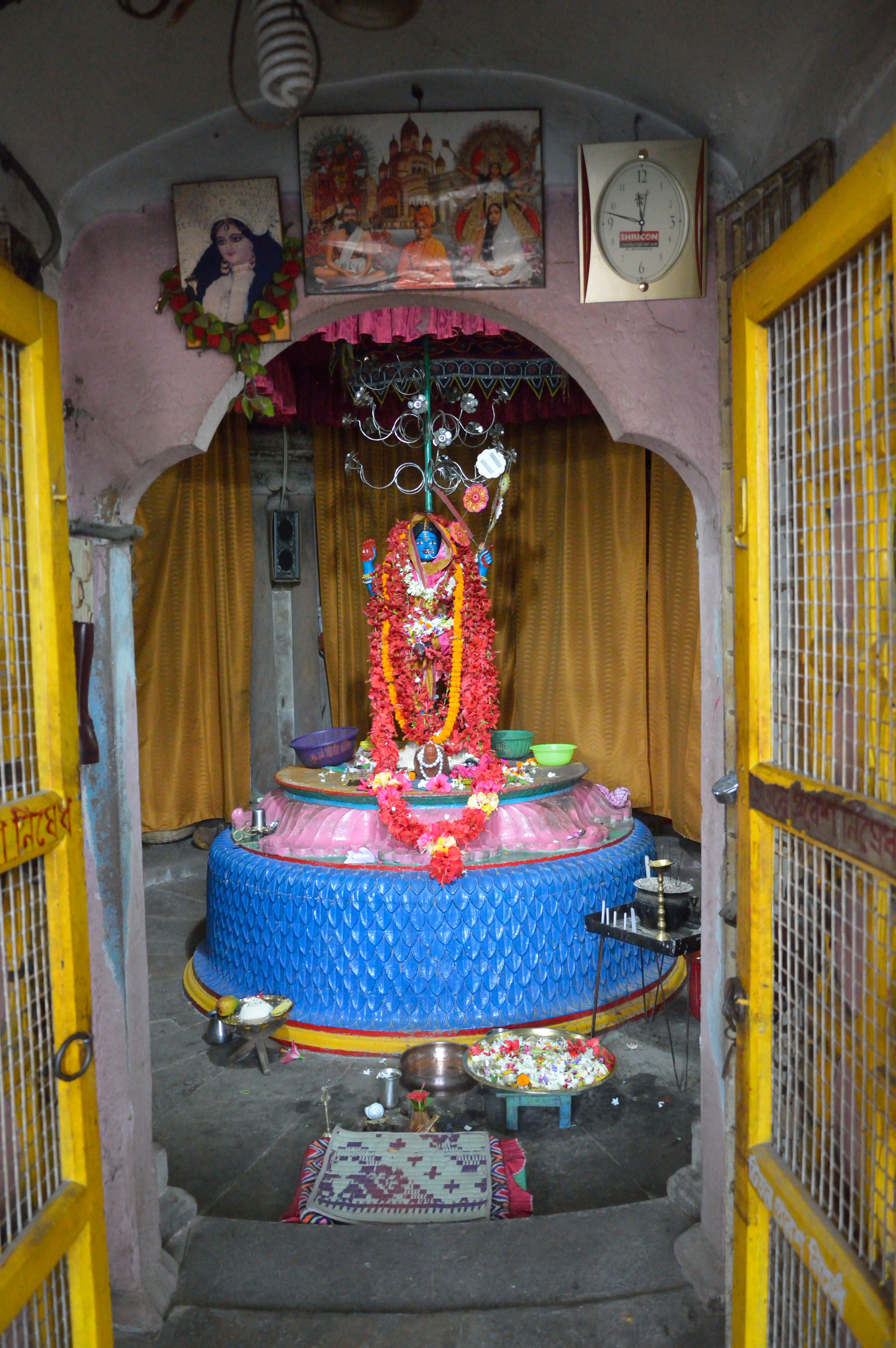
Hangseshwari Temple goddess

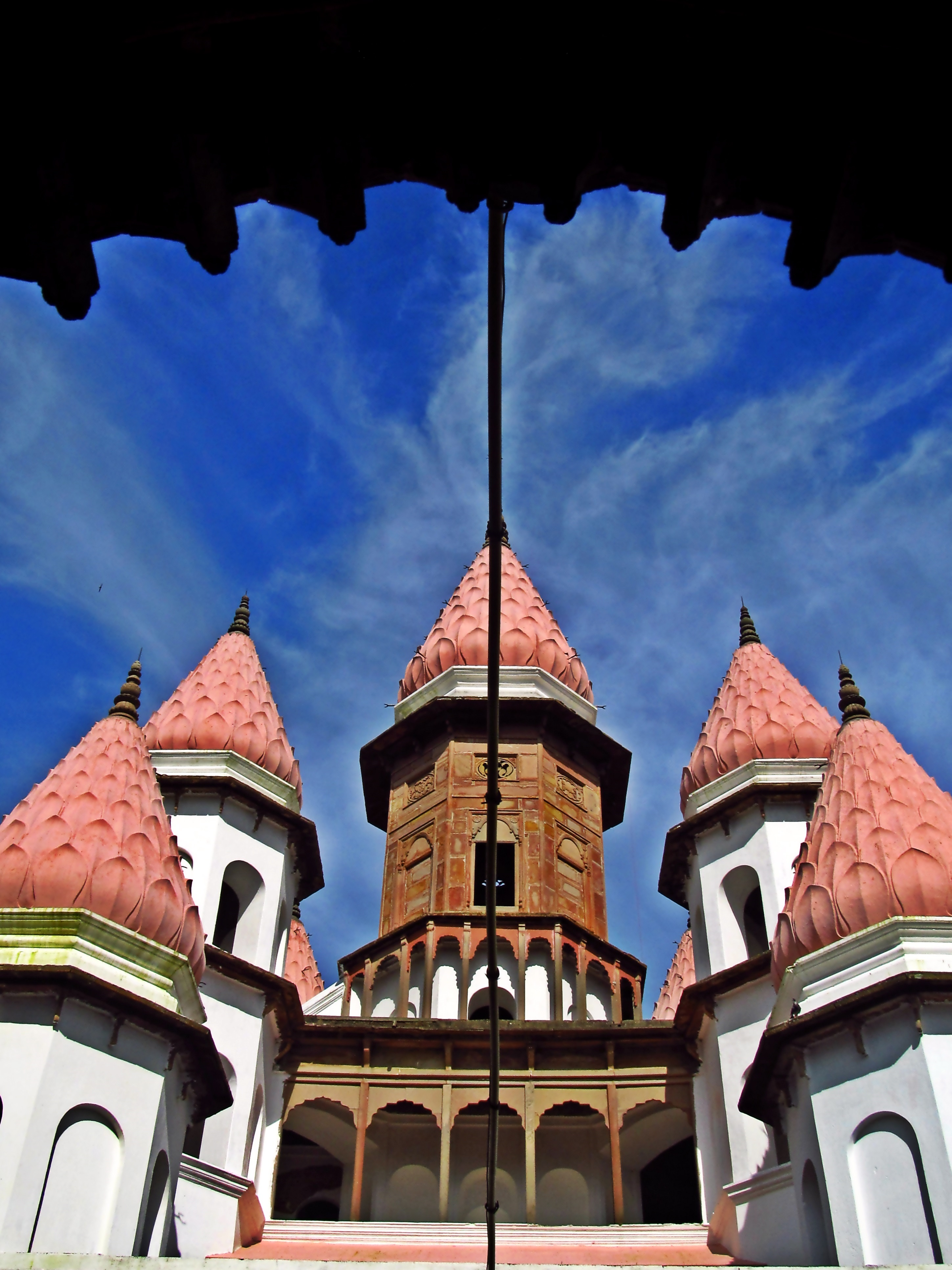
Hangseshwari temple from inside the Basudev temple
