= Sonbarsa (disambiguation) =

Sonbarsa may refer to:

- Sonbarsa, a village in Parsa District in the Narayani Zone of southern Nepal
- Sonbarsa, Ballia, a village in Ballia District, Uttar Pradesh, India
- Sonbarsa, Raebareli, a village in Raebareli district, Uttar Pradesh, India
- Sonbarsa, Sitamarhi, a village in Sitamarhi District, Bihar, India
- Sonbarsa Raj, a village in Saharsa District, Bihar, India
