= Madhopur Pathak =

Madhopur Pathak Mādhopur Pathak
- Village
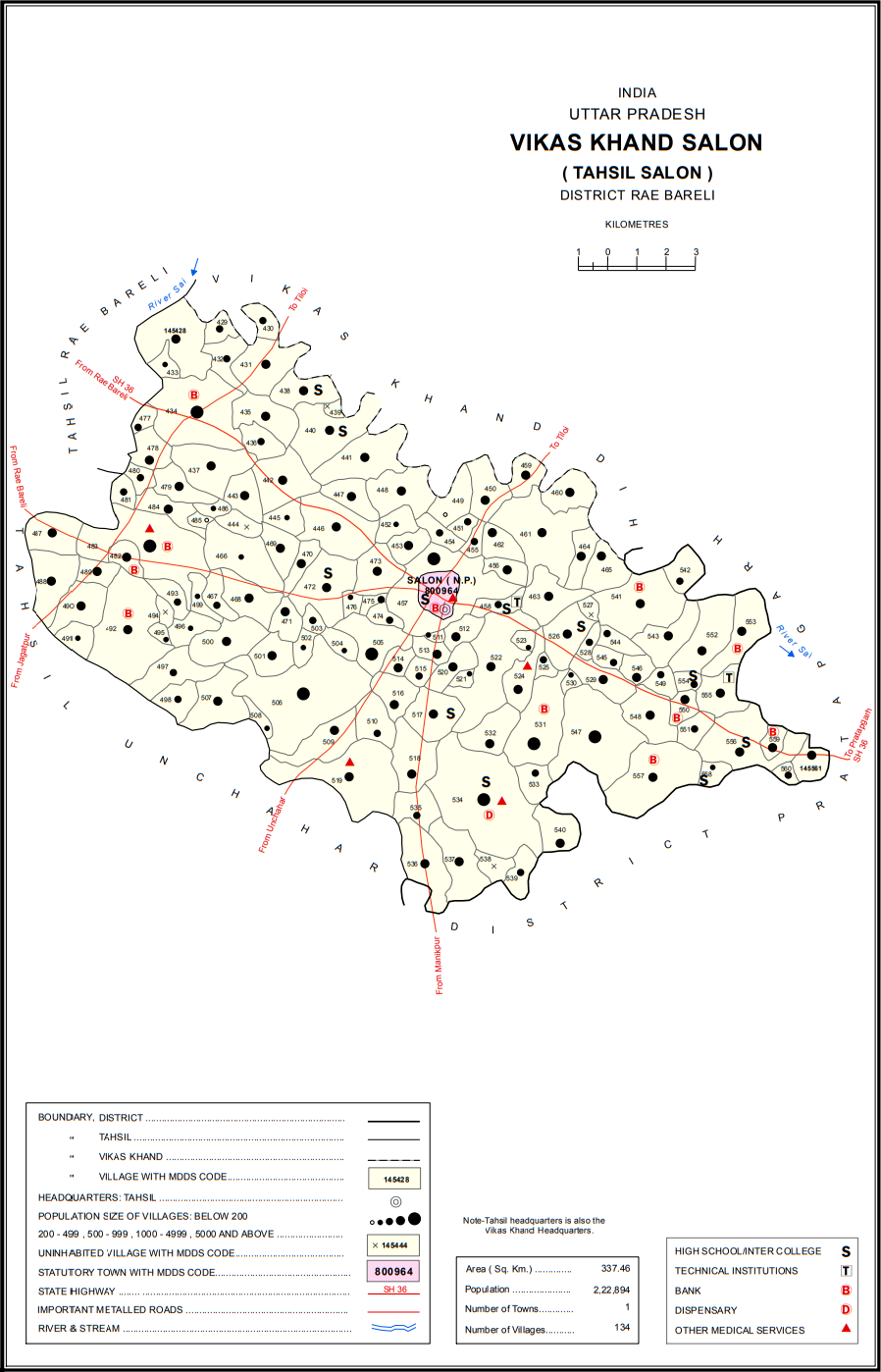
- Map showing Madhopur Pathak (#545) in Salon CD block

- Location in Uttar Pradesh, India
- Coordinates: 26.006168°N 81.51355°E
- Country: India
- State: Uttar Pradesh
- District: Raebareli

Area
  - Total: 0.708 km^{2} (0.273 sq mi)

Population (2011)
  - Total: 923
  - Density: 1,300/km^{2} (3,380/sq mi)

Languages
  - Official: Hindi
- Time zone: UTC+5:30 (IST)
- Vehicle registration: UP-35

Madhopur Pathak is a village in Salon block of Rae Bareli district, Uttar Pradesh, India. It is located 37 km from Raebareli, the district headquarters. As of 2011, Madhopur Pathak has a population of 923 people, in 190 households. It has two primary schools and no healthcare facilities, and it does not host a permanent market or a periodic haat.

The 1961 census recorded Madhopur Pathak as comprising 2 hamlets, with a total population of 269 people (129 male and 140 female), in 52 households and 47 physical houses. The area of the village was given as 177 acres.

The 1981 census recorded Madhopur Pathak as having a population of 445 people, in 128 households, and having an area of 71.22 hectares. The main staple foods were given as wheat and barley.
