= Khwajapur =

Khwajapur Khwājāpur
- Village
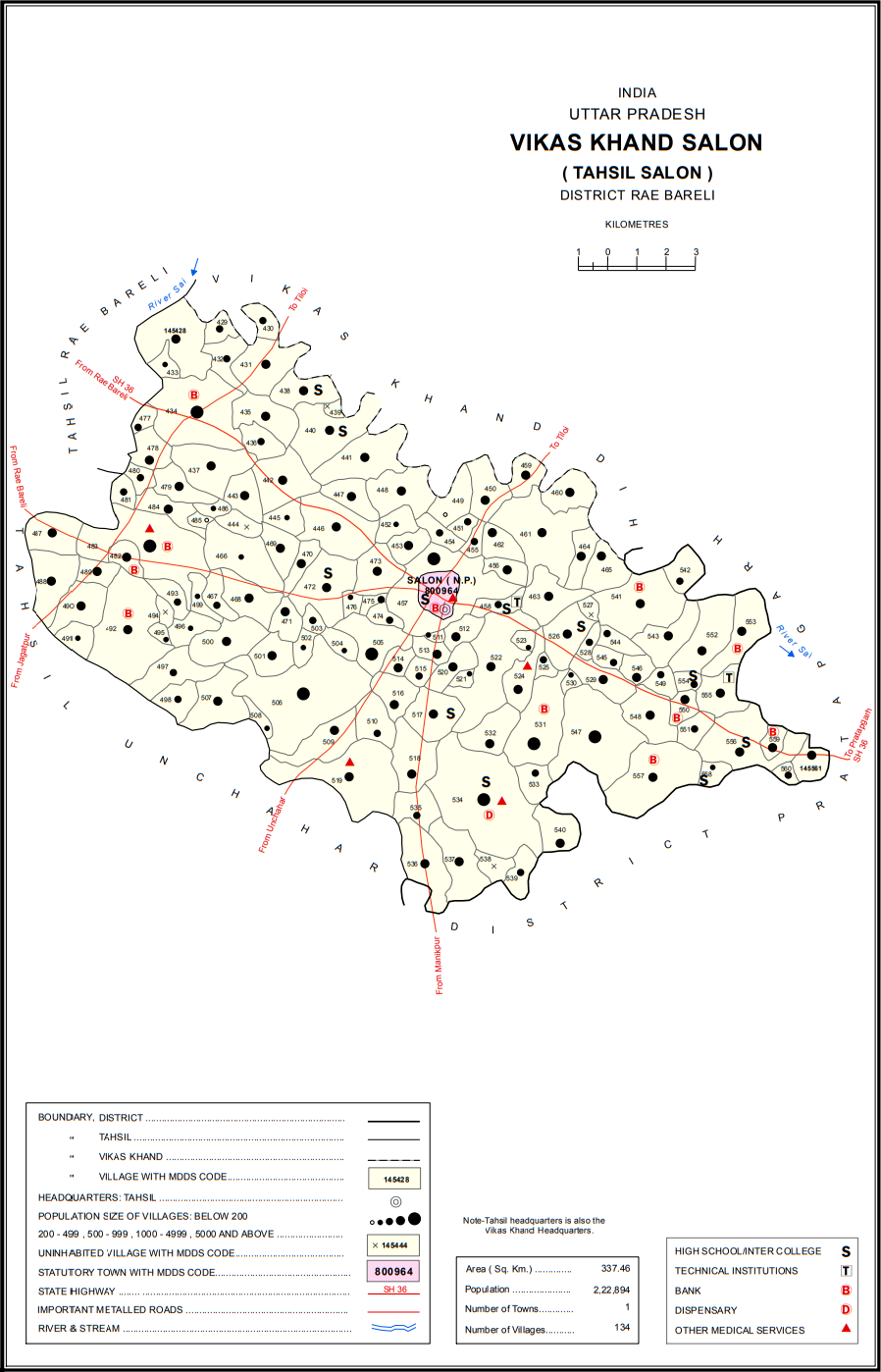
- Map showing Khwajapur (#518) in Salon CD block

- Location in Uttar Pradesh, India
- Coordinates: 25.973368°N 81.444416°E
- Country India: India
- State: Uttar Pradesh
- District: Raebareli

Area
  - Total: 2.53 km^{2} (0.98 sq mi)

Population (2011)
  - Total: 2,305
  - Density: 911/km^{2} (2,360/sq mi)

Languages
  - Official: Hindi
- Time zone: UTC+5:30 (IST)
- Vehicle registration: UP-35

Khwajapur is a village in Salon block of Rae Bareli district, Uttar Pradesh, India. It is located 38 km from Raebareli, the district headquarters. As of 2011, Khwajapur has a population of 2,305 people, in 399 households. It has one primary school and no healthcare facilities.

The 1961 census recorded Khwajapur as comprising 3 hamlets, with a total population of 823 people (408 male and 415 female), in 170 households and 163 physical houses. The area of the village was given as 676 acres.

The 1981 census recorded Khwajapur (as "Khwajpur") as having a population of 1,221 people, in 278 households, and having an area of 273.58 hectares. The main staple foods were given as wheat and rice.
