= Tikaria Bhat =

- Village
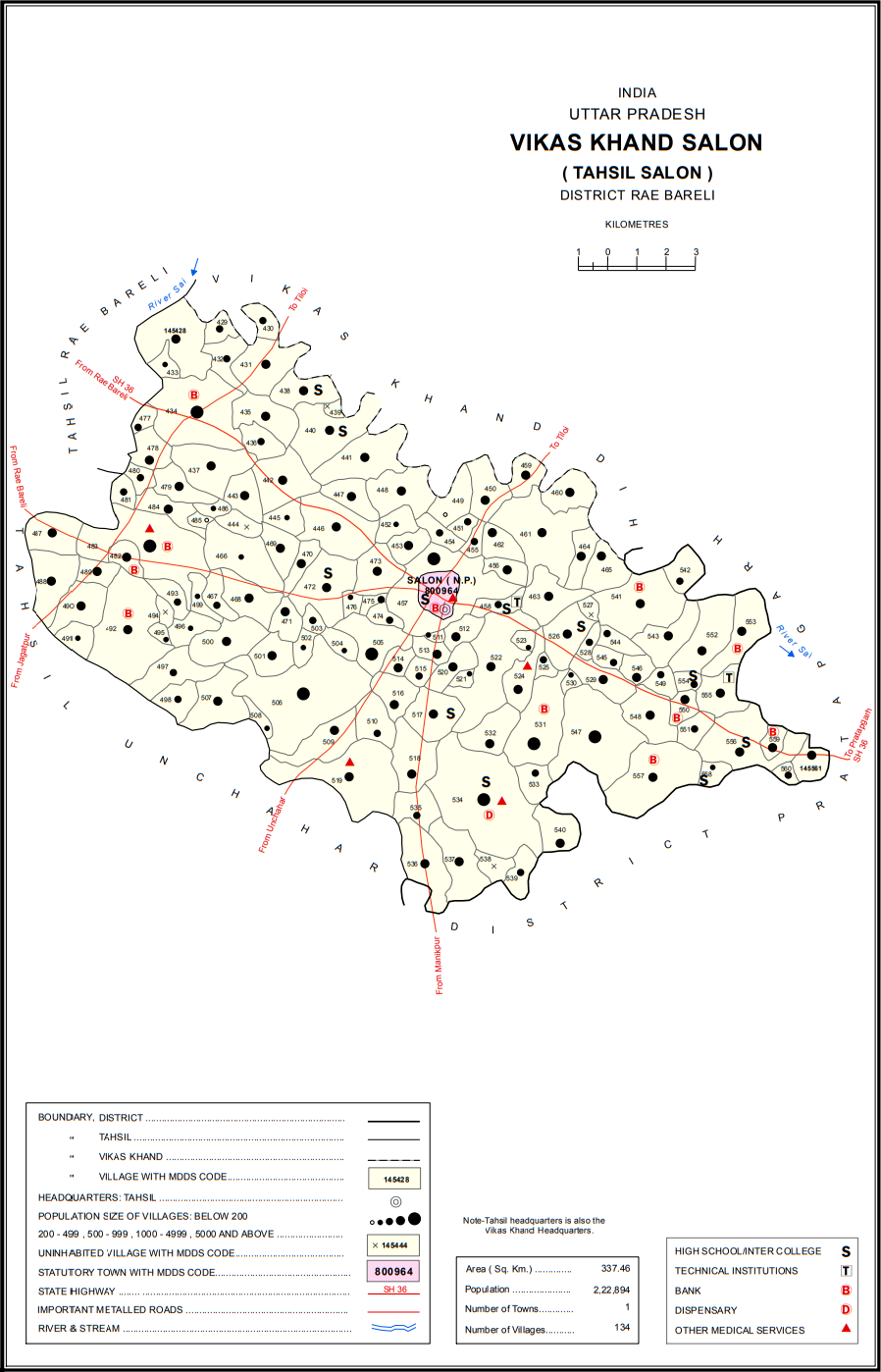
- Map showing Tikaria Bhat (#533) in Salon CD block

- Location in Uttar Pradesh, India
- Coordinates: 25.968285°N 81.488155°E
- Country: India
- State: Uttar Pradesh
- District: Raebareli

Area
  - Total: 2.367 km^{2} (0.914 sq mi)

Population (2011)
  - Total: 667
  - Density: 282/km^{2} (730/sq mi)

Languages
  - Official: Hindi
- Time zone: UTC+5:30 (IST)
- Vehicle registration: UP-35

Tikaria Bhat is a village in Salon block of Rae Bareli district, Uttar Pradesh, India. It is located 40 km from Raebareli, the district headquarters. As of 2011, Tikaria Bhat has a population of 667 people, in 125 households. It has two primary schools and no healthcare facilities, and it hosts a periodic haat but not a permanent market.

The 1961 census recorded Tikaria Bhat as comprising 3 hamlets, with a total population of 230 people (95 male and 135 female), in 42 households and 42 physical houses. The area of the village was given as 277 acres.

The 1981 census recorded Tikaria Bhat as having a population of 289 people, in 74 households, and having an area of 111.11 hectares. The main staple foods were given as wheat and rice.
