= Chak Neknampur =

Chak Neknampur Chak Neknāmpur
- Village
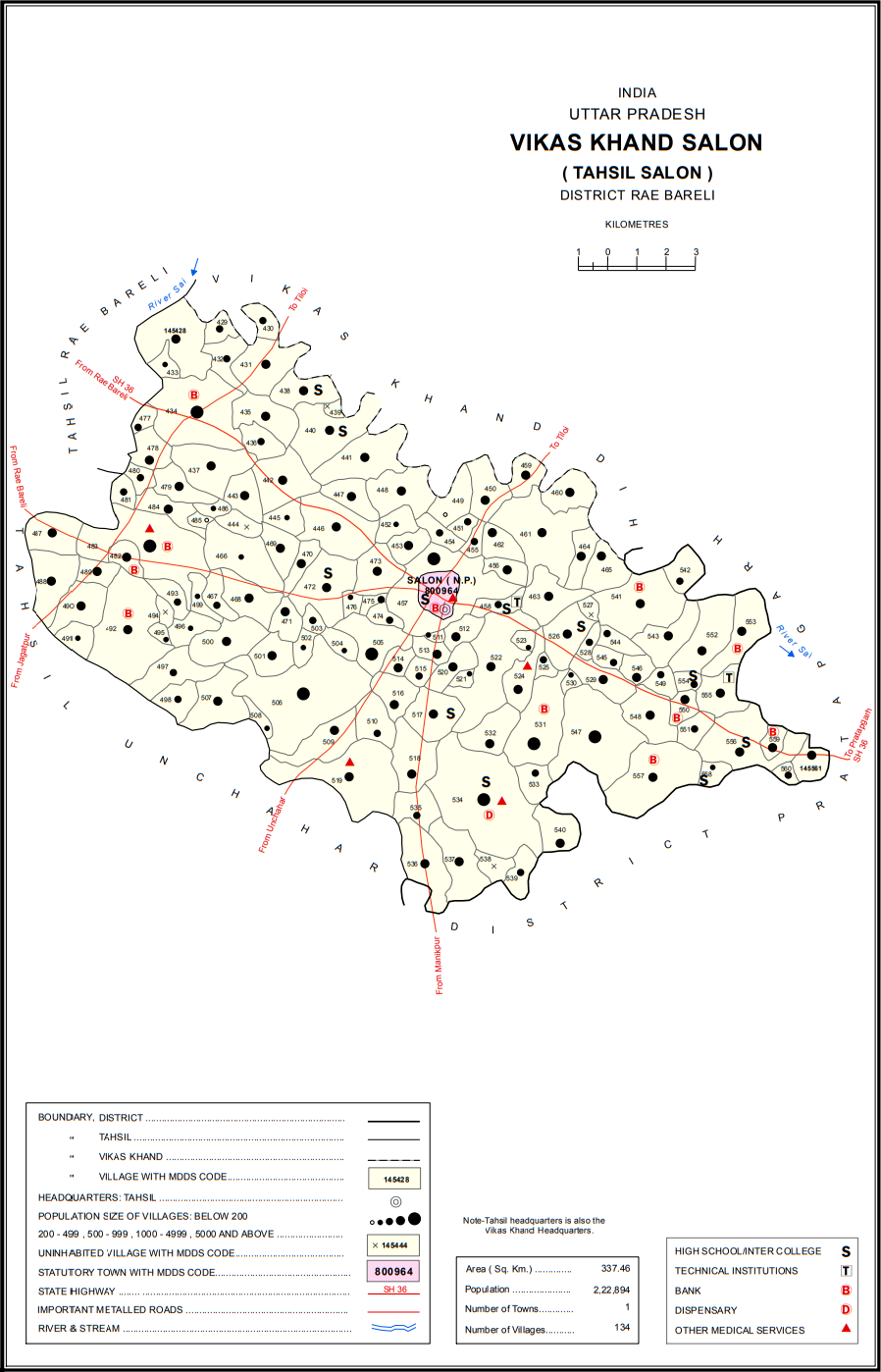
- Map showing Chak Neknampur (#502) in Salon CD block

- Location in Uttar Pradesh, India
- Coordinates: 26.012383°N 81.404024°E
- Country India: India
- State: Uttar Pradesh
- District: Raebareli

Area
  - Total: 0.594 km^{2} (0.229 sq mi)

Population (2011)
  - Total: 442
  - Density: 744/km^{2} (1,930/sq mi)

Languages
  - Official: Hindi
- Time zone: UTC+5:30 (IST)
- Vehicle registration: UP-35

Chak Neknampur is a village in Salon block of Rae Bareli district, Uttar Pradesh, India. It is located 34 km from Raebareli, the district headquarters. As of 2011, Chak Neknampur has a population of 442 people, in 75 households. It has one primary school and no healthcare facilities.

The 1961 census recorded Chak Neknampur as comprising 2 hamlets, with a total population of 207 people (91 male and 116 female), in 37 households and 37 physical houses. The area of the village was given as 156 acres.

The 1981 census recorded Chak Neknampur as having a population of 325 people, in 80 households, and having an area of 59.89 hectares. The main staple foods were given as wheat and rice.
