= Ghuranpur =

Ghuranpur Ghūranpur
- Village
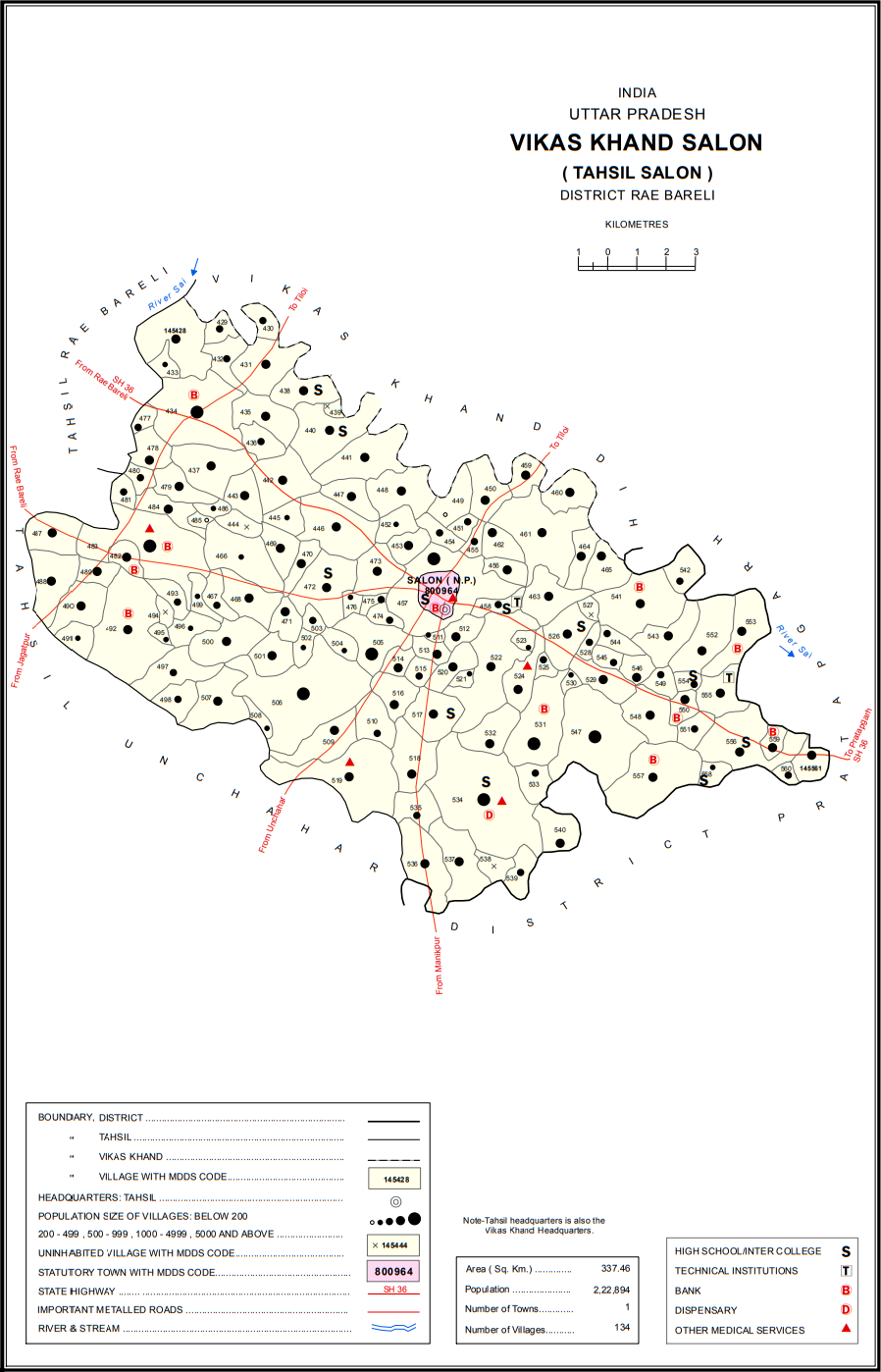
- Map showing Ghuranpur (#554) in Salon CD block

- Location in Uttar Pradesh, India
- Coordinates: 26.001578°N 81.543271°E
- Country: India
- State: Uttar Pradesh
- District: Raebareli

Area
  - Total: 2.091 km^{2} (0.807 sq mi)

Population (2011)
  - Total: 694
  - Density: 332/km^{2} (860/sq mi)

Languages
  - Official: Hindi
- Time zone: UTC+5:30 (IST)
- Vehicle registration: UP-35

Ghuranpur is a village in Salon block of Rae Bareli district, Uttar Pradesh, India. It is located 48 km from Raebareli, the district headquarters. As of 2011, Ghuranpur has a population of 694 people, in 123 households. It has 4 primary schools and no healthcare facilities, and it does not host a permanent market or a periodic haat. Agriculturally, the main crops grown here are rice, wheat, and potatoes.

The 1961 census recorded Ghuranpur as comprising 2 hamlets, with a total population of 56 people (33 male and 23 female), in 11 households and 10 physical houses. The area of the village was given as 164 acres.

The 1981 census recorded Ghuranpur as having a population of 391 people, in 86 households, and having an area of 63.53 hectares.
