= Raipur Mahewa =

Raipur Mahewa Rāipur Mahewa
- Village
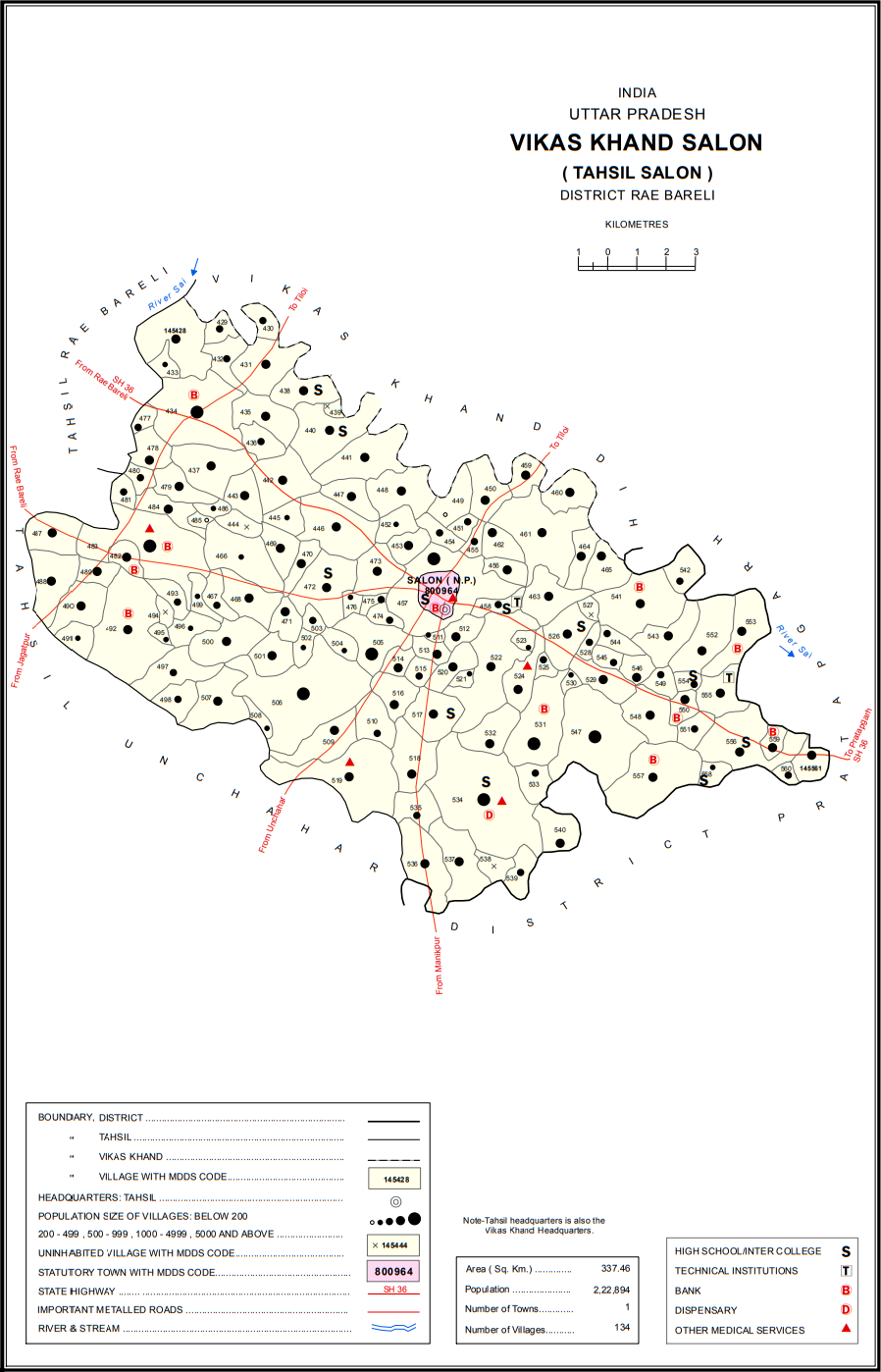
- Map showing Raipur Mahewa (#432) in Salon CD block

- Location in Uttar Pradesh, India
- Coordinates: 26.102443°N 81.37602°E
- Country India: India
- State: Uttar Pradesh
- District: Raebareli

Area
  - Total: 1.84 km^{2} (0.71 sq mi)

Population (2011)
  - Total: 979
  - Density: 532/km^{2} (1,380/sq mi)

Languages
  - Official: Hindi
- Time zone: UTC+5:30 (IST)
- Vehicle registration: UP-35

Raipur Mahewa is a village in Salon block of Rae Bareli district, Uttar Pradesh, India. It is located 2 km from Salon, the block headquarters. As of 2011, Raipur Mahewa has a population of 979 people, in 186 households. It has one primary school and no healthcare facilities.

The 1961 census recorded Raipur Mahewa as comprising 1 hamlet, with a total population of 386 people (193 male and 193 female), in 95 households and 95 physical houses. The area of the village was given as 466 acres.

The 1981 census recorded Raipur Mahewa as having a population of 512 people, in 46 households, and having an area of 183.75 hectares. The main staple foods were given as wheat and rice.
