= Ghurhat =

- Village
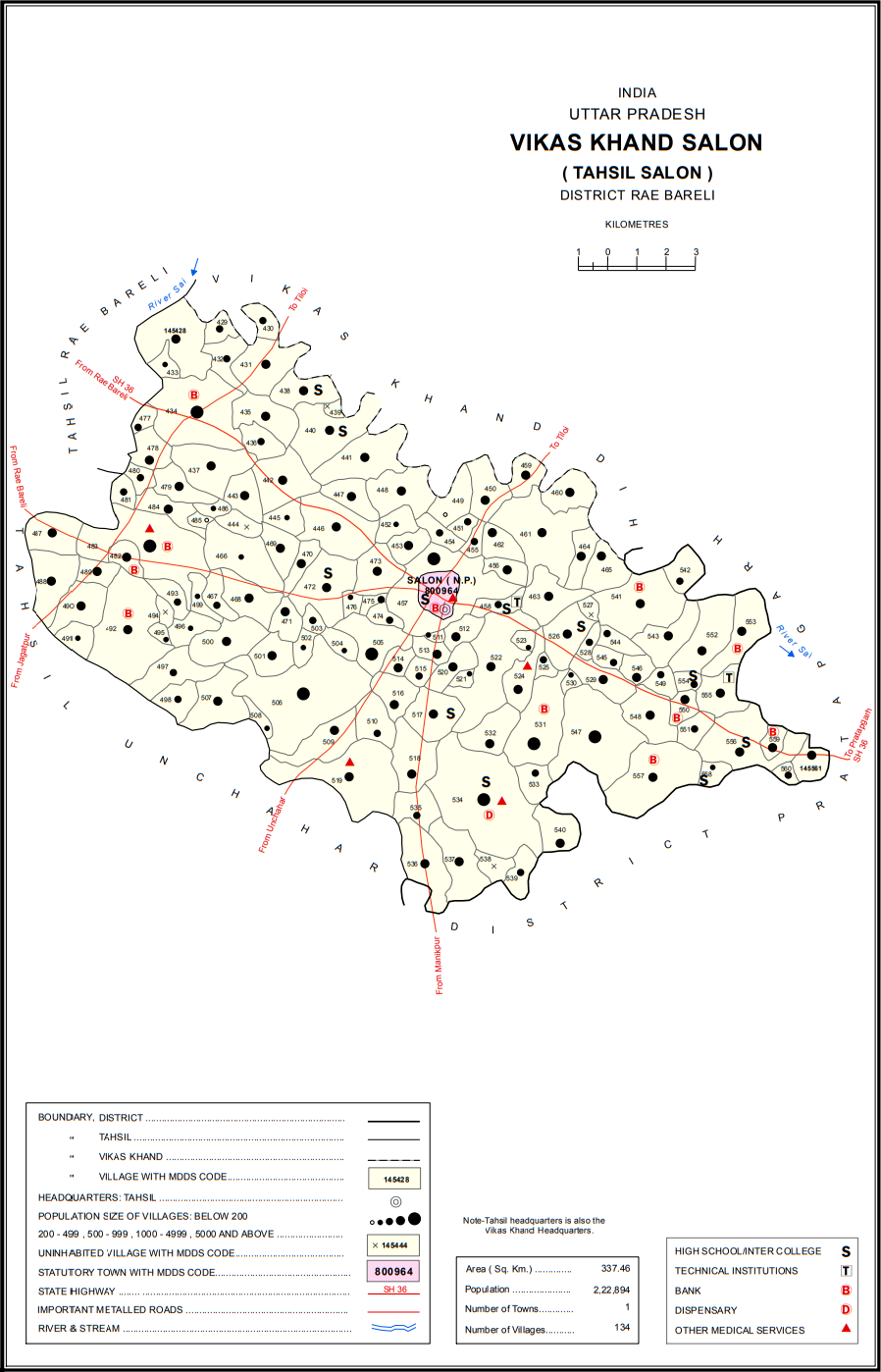
- Map showing Ghurhat (#498) in Salon CD block

- Location in Uttar Pradesh, India
- Coordinates: 25.991894°N 81.364695°E
- Country India: India
- State: Uttar Pradesh
- District: Raebareli

Area
  - Total: 0.998 km^{2} (0.385 sq mi)

Population (2011)
  - Total: 693
  - Density: 694/km^{2} (1,800/sq mi)

Languages
  - Official: Hindi
- Time zone: UTC+5:30 (IST)
- Vehicle registration: UP-35

Ghurhat is a village in Salon block of Rae Bareli district, Uttar Pradesh, India. It is located 37 km from Raebareli, the district headquarters. As of 2011, Ghurhat has a population of 693 people, in 115 households. It has one primary school and no healthcare facilities.

The 1961 census recorded Ghurhat as comprising 3 hamlets, with a total population of 299 people (143 male and 156 female), in 66 households and 61 physical houses. The area of the village was given as 250 acres.

The 1981 census recorded Ghurhat as having a population of 424 people, in 102 households, and having an area of 90.96 hectares. The main staple foods were given as wheat and rice.
