= Kateha =

- Village
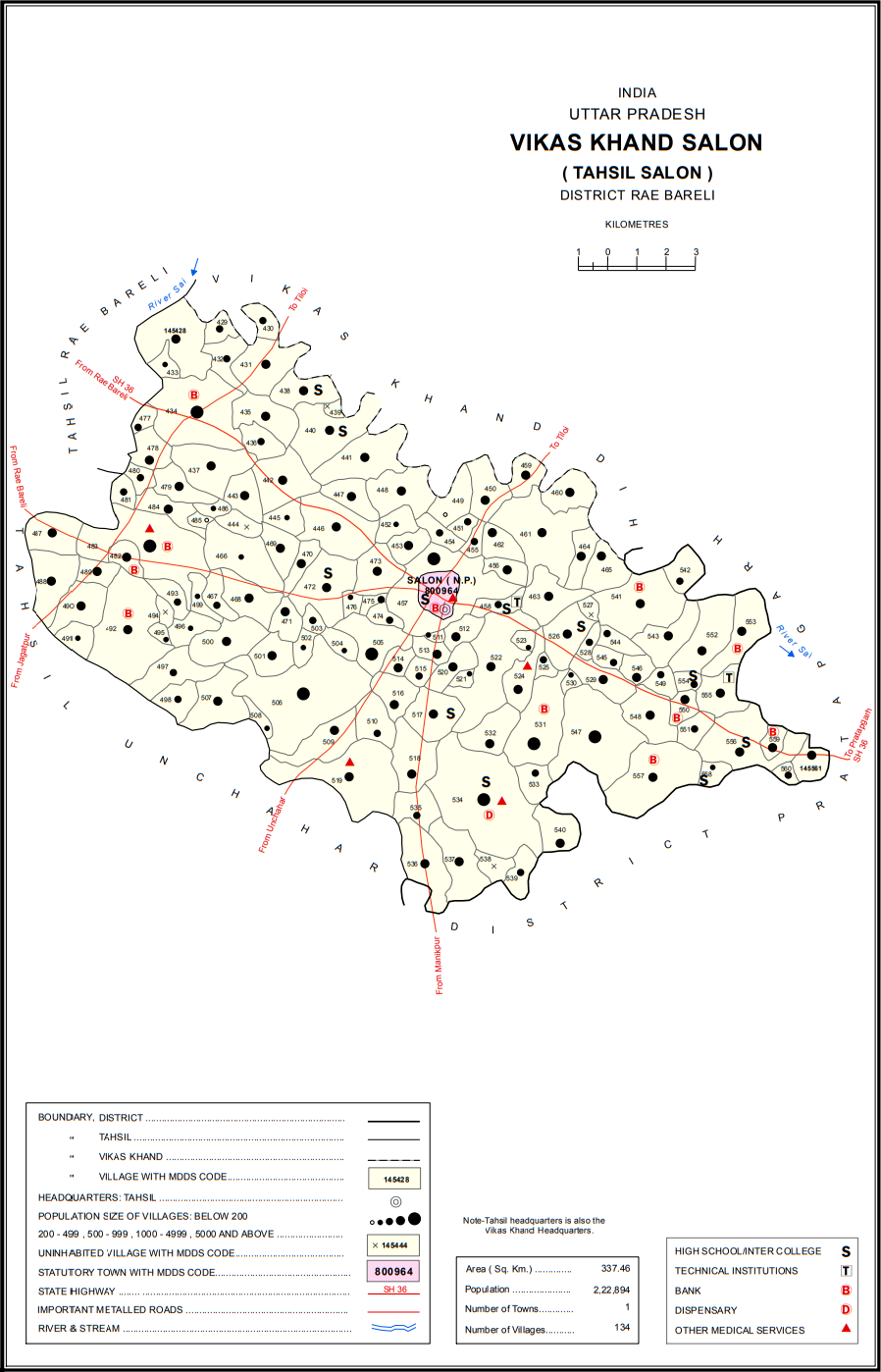
- Map showing Kateha (#473) in Salon CD block

- Location in Uttar Pradesh, India
- Coordinates: 26.033787°N 81.431363°E
- Country India: India
- State: Uttar Pradesh
- District: Raebareli

Area
  - Total: 1.959 km^{2} (0.756 sq mi)

Population (2011)
  - Total: 1,795
  - Density: 916.3/km^{2} (2,373/sq mi)

Languages
  - Official: Hindi
- Time zone: UTC+5:30 (IST)
- Vehicle registration: UP-35

Kateha is a village in Salon block of Rae Bareli district, Uttar Pradesh, India. It is located 30 km from Raebareli, the district headquarters. As of 2011, Kateha has a population of 1,795 people, in 292 households. It has one primary school and no healthcare facilities.

The 1961 census recorded Kateha (as "Kateh") as comprising 3 hamlets, with a total population of 411 people (173 male and 238 female), in 78 households and 73 physical houses. The area of the village was given as 498 acres.

The 1981 census recorded Kateha (as "Kateh") as having a population of 801 people, in 180 households, and having an area of 201.53 hectares. The main staple foods were given as wheat and rice.
