= Kapuripur =

Kapuripur Kapūrīpur
- Village
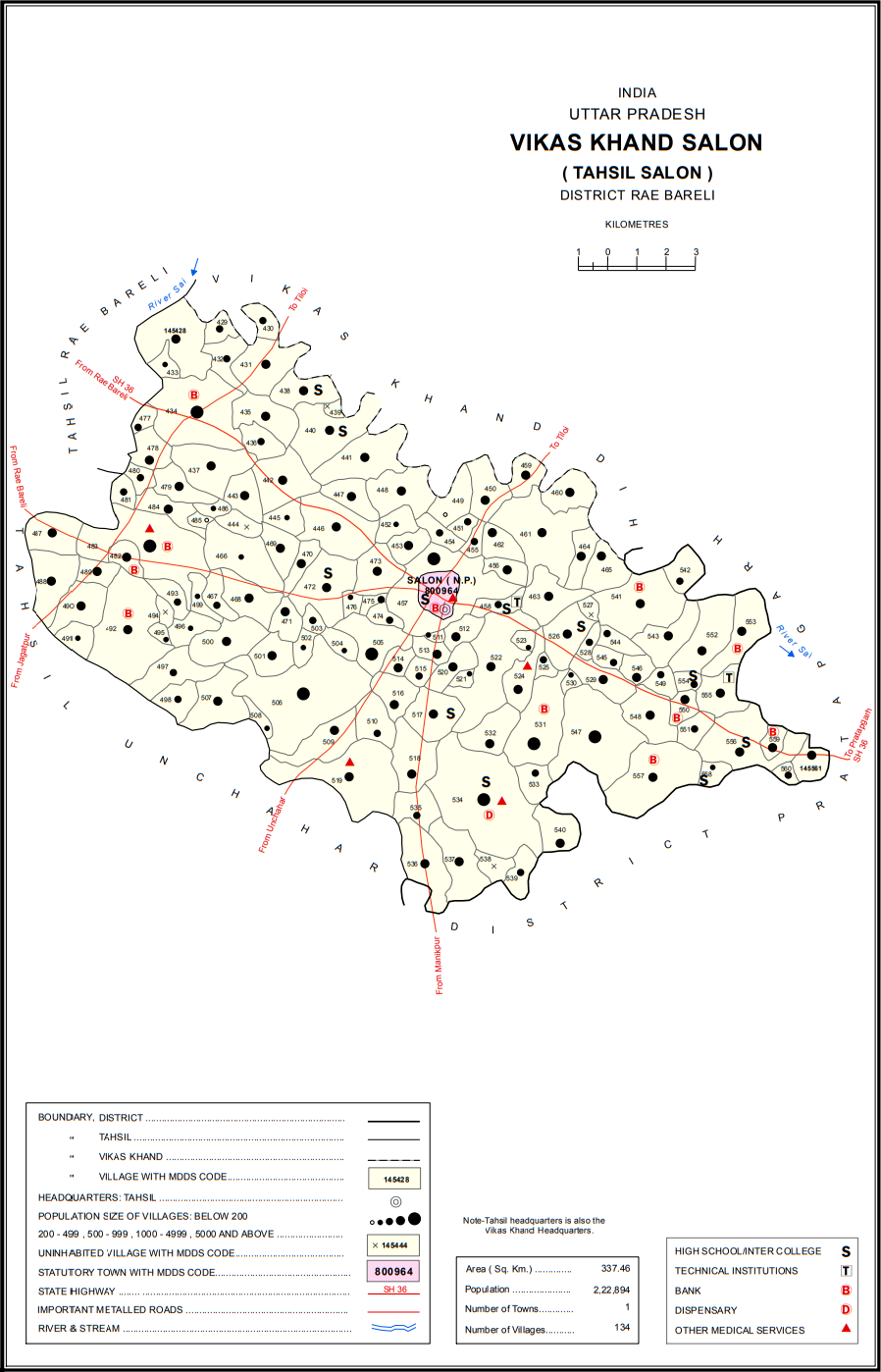
- Map showing Kapuripur (#529) in Salon CD block

- Location in Uttar Pradesh, India
- Coordinates: 25.990849°N 81.514396°E
- Country: India
- State: Uttar Pradesh
- District: Raebareli

Area
  - Total: 1.277 km^{2} (0.493 sq mi)

Population (2011)
  - Total: 1,001
  - Density: 783.9/km^{2} (2,030/sq mi)

Languages
  - Official: Hindi
- Time zone: UTC+5:30 (IST)
- Vehicle registration: UP-35

Kapuripur is a village in Salon block of Rae Bareli district, Uttar Pradesh, India. It is located 43 km from Raebareli, the district headquarters. As of 2011, Kapuripur has a population of 1,001 people, in 173 households. It has no schools or healthcare facilities, and it hosts a permanent market but not a periodic haat.

The 1961 census recorded Kapuripur as comprising 1 hamlet, with a total population of 377 people (192 male and 185 female), in 110 households and 108 physical houses. The area of the village was given as 326 acres.

The 1981 census recorded Kapuripur (as "Kapooripur") as having a population of 441 people, in 124 households, and having an area of 132.34 hectares. The main staple foods were given as wheat and rice.
