= Qazipur Gosain =

Qazipur Gosain Qāzīpur Gosāīn
- Village
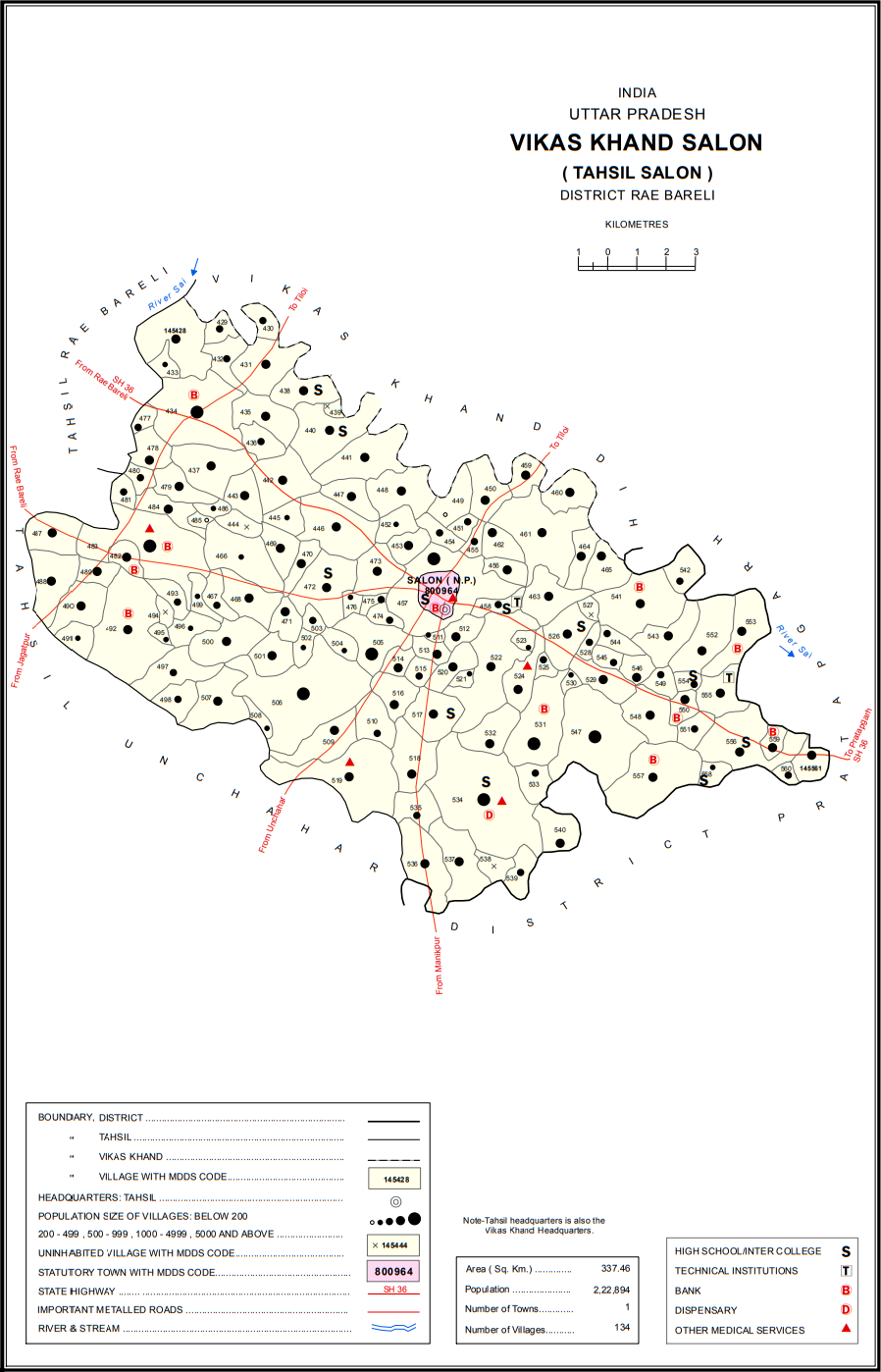
- Map showing Qazipur Gosain (#560) in Salon CD block

- Location in Uttar Pradesh, India
- Coordinates: 25.969881°N 81.576089°E
- Country: India
- State: Uttar Pradesh
- District: Raebareli

Area
  - Total: 0.288 km^{2} (0.111 sq mi)

Population (2011)
  - Total: 563
  - Density: 1,950/km^{2} (5,060/sq mi)

Languages
  - Official: Hindi
- Time zone: UTC+5:30 (IST)
- Vehicle registration: UP-35

Qazipur Gosain is a village in Salon block of Rae Bareli district, Uttar Pradesh, India. As of 2011, it has a population of 563 people, in 98 households. It has one primary school and no healthcare facility. It hosts both a permanent market and a periodic haat.

The 1961 census recorded Qazipur Gosain as comprising 1 hamlet, with a total population of 128 people (42 male and 86 female), in 39 households and 37 physical houses. The area of the village was given as 82 acres.

The 1981 census recorded Qazipur Gosain (as "Qazipur Gosayin") as having a population of 283 people, in 67 households, and having an area of 34.03 hectares. The main staple foods were given as wheat and rice.
