= Taragarh, Raebareli =

Taragarh Tārāgarh
- Village
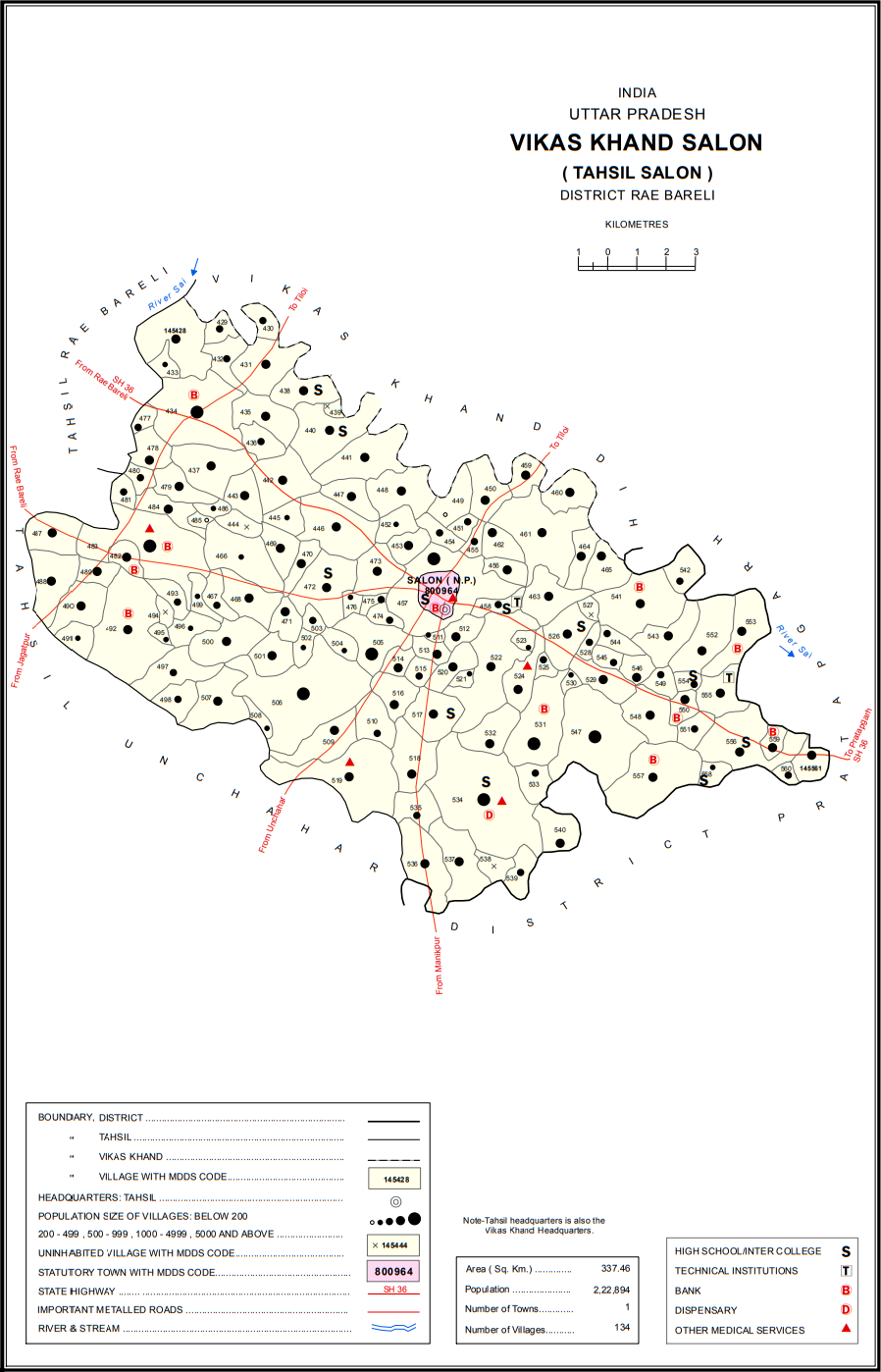
- Map showing Taragarh (#444) in Salon CD block

- Location in Uttar Pradesh, India
- Coordinates: 26.052004°N 81.389793°E
- Country India: India
- State: Uttar Pradesh
- District: Raebareli

Area
  - Total: 0.277 km^{2} (0.107 sq mi)

Population (2011)
  - Total: 0
  - Density: 0.0/km^{2} (0.0/sq mi)

Languages
  - Official: Hindi
- Time zone: UTC+5:30 (IST)
- Vehicle registration: UP-35

Taragarh is an abandoned village in Salon block of Rae Bareli district, Uttar Pradesh, India. It is 24 km (15 mi) from Raebareli, the district headquarters. As of 2011, Taragarh is uninhabited, although the land is used for agricultural purposes. The village lands cover 27.7 hectares (68 acres), of which 17.6 ha (43 acres) were used as farmland in 2011; another 3.9 ha (9.6 acres) were under forest cover.

The 1961 census recorded Taragarh as comprising 1 hamlet, with a total population of 87 people (42 male and 45 female), in 21 households and 20 physical houses. The area of the village was given as 68 acres.

The 1981 census recorded Taragarh as having a population of 0 and an area of 27.93 hectares.
