= Reoli, Raebareli =

Reoli Rewli, Rewali
- Village
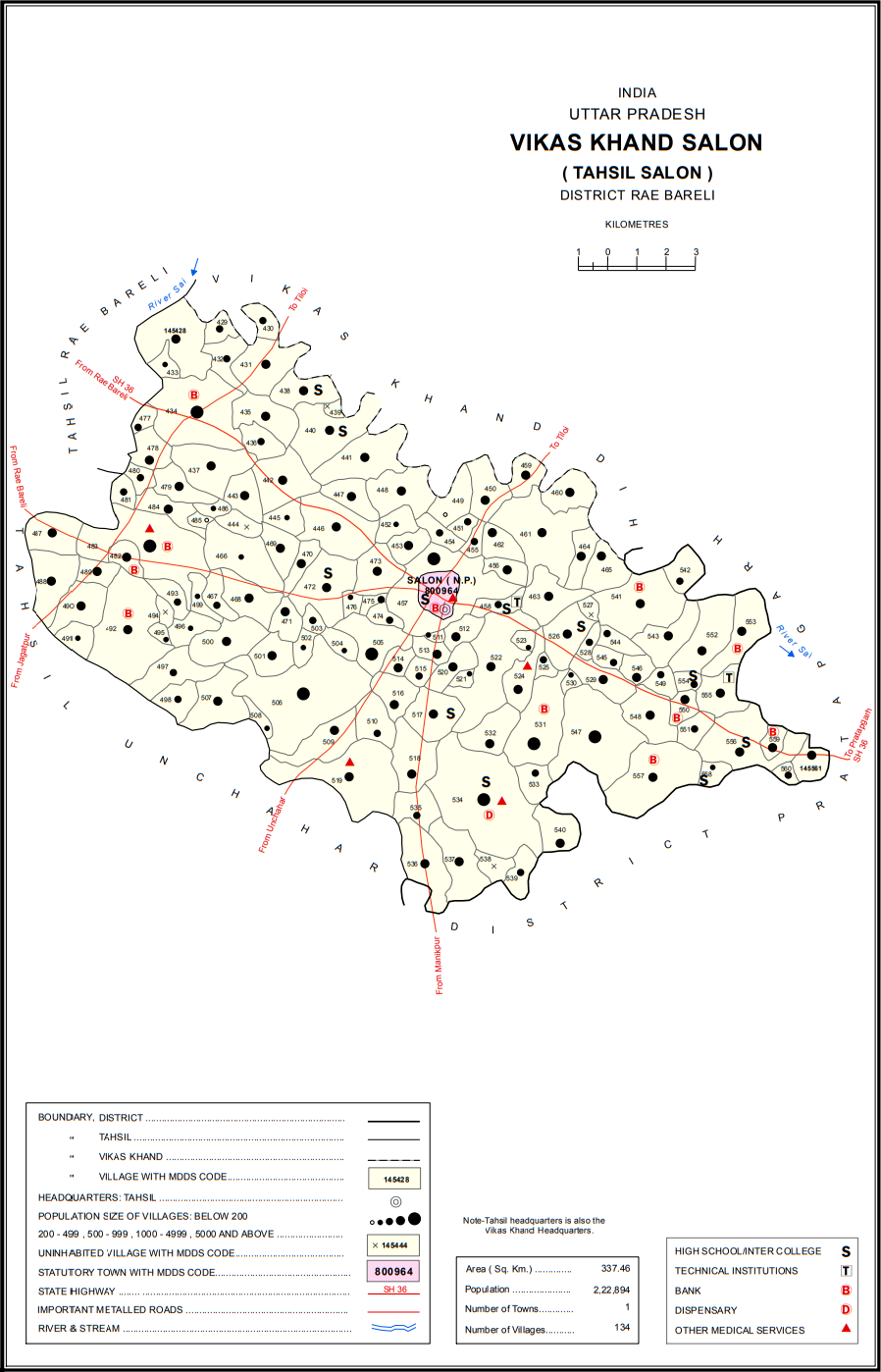
- Map showing Reoli (#468) in Salon CD block

- Location in Uttar Pradesh, India
- Coordinates: 26.026555°N 81.381194°E
- Country India: India
- State: Uttar Pradesh
- District: Raebareli

Area
  - Total: 2.392 km^{2} (0.924 sq mi)

Population (2011)
  - Total: 2,118
  - Density: 885.5/km^{2} (2,293/sq mi)

Languages
  - Official: Hindi
- Time zone: UTC+5:30 (IST)
- Vehicle registration: UP-35

Reoli, also spelled Rewli or Rewali, is a village in Salon block of Rae Bareli district, Uttar Pradesh, India. It is located 7 km from Salon, the tehsil headquarters. As of 2011, Reoli has a population of 2,118 people, in 368 households. It has one primary school and no healthcare facilities.

The 1961 census recorded Reoli as comprising 5 hamlets, with a total population of 921 people (430 male and 491 female), in 198 households and 196 physical houses. The area of the village was given as 615 acres.

The 1981 census recorded Reoli (as "Rewli") as having a population of 1,296 people, in 362 households, and having an area of 238.36 hectares. The main staple foods were given as wheat and rice.
