= Salon, India =

Salon
- Town
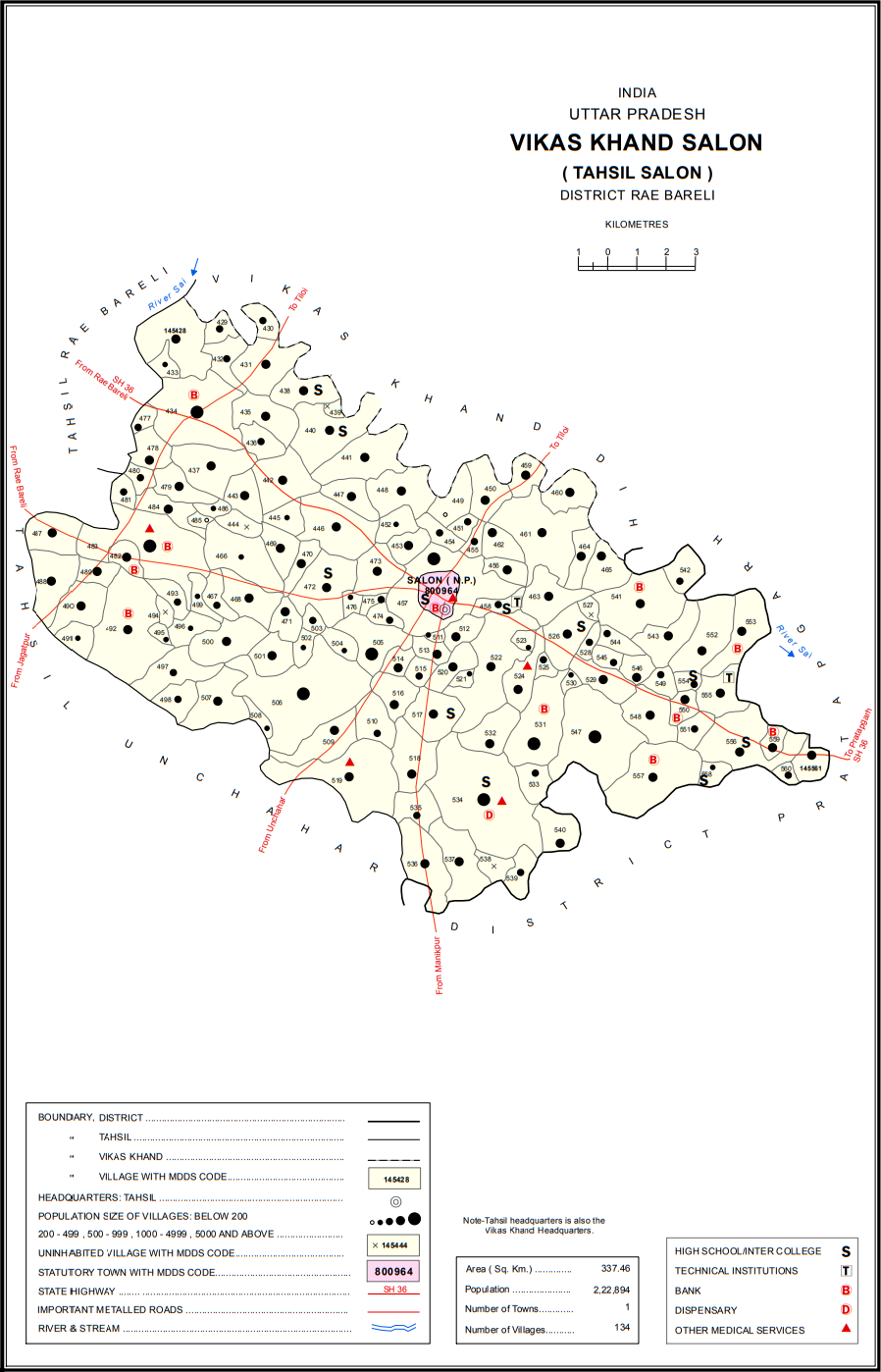
- Map of Salon CD block

- Location in Uttar Pradesh, India Salon (India)
- Coordinates: 26.03°N 81.45°E
- Country: India
- State: Uttar Pradesh
- Division: Lucknow
- District: Amethi

Government
  - Type: Nagar panchayat
  - Body: Nagar PalikaTehsil

Area
  - Total: 1.5 km^{2} (0.58 sq mi)
- Elevation: 110 m (360 ft)

Population (2001)
  - Total: 13,166
  - Density: 8,800/km^{2} (23,000/sq mi)

Languages
  - Official: Hindi
- Time zone: UTC+5:30 (IST)
- PIN: 229127
- Telephone code: 05311
- Vehicle registration: UP33

Salon is a town and nagar panchayat in Raebareli district in the Indian state of Uttar Pradesh. It serves as the headquarters of a tehsil as well as a community development block. Originally it was also the headquarters of the entire district, but they were moved after the Indian Rebellion of 1857. It is located a bit to the south of the Sai river, at the junction of the Raebareli-Pratapgarh and Jais-Khaga roads. Other roads lead to Dalmau, Manikpur, and Kunda. To the east is a large jhil.

Salon is located at 26.03°N 81.45°E. It has an average elevation of 110 metres (360 feet).

As of 2011, Salon had a population of 14,757, in 2,130 households.

== History ==
According to legend, Salon was founded by Salivahan, the ancestor of the Bais. It was under Bhar rule for a long time, but although they were driven out by the Muslims after the murder of two Sayyids passing through, the Muslims did not make much headway here until the late 1700s, during the reign of Asaf-ud-Daula. Under the Nawabs of Awadh, Salon was the headquarters of a chakla and had a garrison of 350 soldiers, 50 of whom were stationed in the faujdars mud fort on the south side of town.

Around 1800, Salon was a prosperous town, but it declined by the end of the 19th century. After the British annexed Awadh in 1856, Salon was originally chosen to be the district headquarters, but it lost that status after the 1857 uprising. It was then put under Pratapgarh district as a tehsil headquarters, and finally transferred under Raebareli district in 1869.

At the turn of the 20th century, Salon was described as a small but historic town, "surrounded by groves and clumps of palm trees" and possessing a locally important bazar called Fazalganj, which held markets twice per week. The tehsil headquarters were also located in town, along with a police station, post office, cattle pound, and large middle vernacular school. Its population as of 1901 was 5,170 people, including 2,954 Muslims.

== Demographics ==
Historical population
Year	Pop.	±%
1901	5,170	—
1911	4,762	−7.9%
1921	4,576	−3.9%
1931	5,112	+11.7%
1941	5,751	+12.5%
1951	5,621	−2.3%
1961	Not given	—
1971	Not given	—
1981	8,108	—
1991	10,460	+29.0%
2001	13,189	+26.1%
2011	14,757	+11.9%
Source: 2011 Census of India

As of the 2001 Census of India, Salon had a population of 13,166. Males constituted 51.30% of the population and females 48.70%. Salon had an average literacy rate of 49.54%. In Salon, 17% of the population were under 6 years of age.

According to the 2011 census, Salon had a population of 14,757 people, in 2,130 households. The town's sex ratio was 973 females to every 1000 males, which was the highest among towns in Raebareli district; 7,479 of Salon's residents were male (50.7%) and 7,278 were female (49.3%). The 0–6 age group made up about 14.0% of the town's population; the sex ratio for this group was 968, which was higher than the district urban average for this group. Members of Scheduled Castes made up 6.78% of the town's population, while members of Scheduled Tribes made up 0.01%. Salon's literacy rate was 74.34% (counting only people age 7 and up); literacy was higher among men and boys (80.29%) than among women and girls (68.24%). The scheduled castes literacy rate was 58.25% (65.88% among men and boys, and 50.25% among women and girls).

In terms of employment, 17.43% of Salon residents were classified as main workers (i.e. people employed for at least six months per year) in 2011. Marginal workers (i.e. people employed for less than six months per year) made up 9.07%, and the remaining 73.50% were non-workers. Employment status varied significantly according to gender, with 45.22% of men being either main or marginal workers, compared to only 7.25% of women.

51.03% of Salon residents lived in slum conditions as of 2011. There are six slum areas in Salon: Mikayana East, Gorhi, Paighambarpur West, Nai Bazar, Kachchi Masjid, and Miyan Sahab Ka Pathak (the largest). These range in size from about 135 to 240 households and have between 29 and 131 tap water access points. The number of toilets installed in people's homes ranges from 35 in Paighambarpur West to 125 in Nai Bazar. All six areas are serviced by open sewers, as is the rest of the city.

== Villages ==
Salon CD block has the following 134 villages:

Village name	Total land area (hectares)	Population (in 2011)
Baradih	442.7	2,248
Dandoopur	112.6	828
Faridak Garh	40.1	545
Baghaula	390.1	2,836
Raipur Mahewa	184	979
Asaipur	66.6	402
Suchi	649.9	5,707
Jamurawa Buzurg	260.2	2,483
Jamurawa Khurd	123.1	922
Darshawan	315.2	3,162
Semri Jhakrasi	266.7	1,586
Ganeshpur	30.8	0
Nayan	470.2	2,028
Kandi	322.3	1,241
Umari	394.7	2,335
Rewahara	162.3	1,692
Tara Garh	27.7	0
Pamar Ganj	106.2	417
Bagaha	3,224.8	2,568
Murtaza Nagar Urf Murwaliya	169	1,369
Khamariya Pure Kushal	574.1	2,460
Makhdoompur	137	140
Jujwaliya Urf Bhudwaliya	214.6	1,914
Shahbajpur	66.1	895
Kakraha	103.3	331
Rajapur Mafi	93.5	1,053
Ratanpur	108.2	844
Gaddipur	57	548
Aunanees	76.6	1,115
Salon	812.6	8,018
Aunasadara	521	905
Keshavpur	148.7	1,306
Piranagar Urf Mohaddinpur	182.3	1,626
Barwaliya	637.8	3,846
Sanda Saidan	190.6	3,283
Ataganj Usari	274.6	2,369
Pirthvipur	147.7	1,457
Madhopur Ninaiya	232.6	1,534
Shikohabad	53	206
Pure Muhammad Saeed Urf Umarpur	34	519
Rewali	239.2	2,118
Atarthariya	537.2	3,445
Khatiyara	113.2	1,548
Sonbarsa	551.3	1,041
Matka	337.1	3,479
Kateha	195.9	1,795
Madapur	295.4	570
Kahuwa	36.9	682
Sher Sindhiyapur	14.6	365
Gauwa	95.8	580
Itara	345.3	1,104
Tewaripur	126.2	1,273
Bhatnosa	90.6	639
Tikariya Talluke Baradih	77.7	834
Aliganj	103.5	1,042
Pari	744.8	7,060
Gothiya	146	1,009
Nawabad	60.9	183
Fatehabad	47.3	489
Parashurampur Thekhai	107	1,083
Harpur Halla	308.1	1,935
Parhari	93.1	1,155
Sahari	218.4	2,634
Pure Mansha Ram	69	412
Khairhani Pahar Garh	961.7	4,262
Bhagwanpur Barhaiya	103.5	830
Patti Ashanandpur	36.7	0
Gopalpur Pamar Land	41.4	289
Harkishanpur Tirra	62.2	423
Saidpur	199.5	655
Ghurhat	99.8	693
Khairabad	67.2	327
Bisaiyya	560.9	2,916
Karemuva	149.2	1,201
Chak Neknampur	59.4	442
Pure Meera	54	536
Satwa	70.2	418
Bewali	332.9	5,594
Mamuni	786.4	5,377
Gorwa Hasanpur	427.8	1,256
Hak Ganj	150.8	201
Samaspur Khalsa	243.1	1,334
Runipur	176.1	813
Amarupur	17.2	358
Lalapur	109	1,244
Bhawanipur	81.2	2,154
Kewali Mahima	74.4	2,003
Jahanpur	79.6	652
Ashikabad	179	2,732
Mohammadabad	247.8	1,449
Khwajapur	253	2,305
Paksrawan	601.8	3,653
Rajapur Chak Bibi	190.1	1,523
Pure Muhammad Saeed Urf Fazal	9	330
Dubahan	526.1	4,564
Kalipur	47.2	396
Mohanganj	205.1	2,407
Chak Mirza Pati	32.3	647
Ragghupur	264.3	1,367
Chak Sirsira	20.2	0
Kewalpur Mafi	61.6	755
Kapuripur	127.7	1,001
Ashraf Ganj	37.9	393
Kithanwa	444	5,064
Palhipur	252	2,220
Tikariya Bhat	236.7	667
Dharai	1,080.3	7,865
Autahiya	151	941
Mirjahanpur	54	2,729
Kamalapur	361.2	1,347
Domapur	78.5	0
Kodri	13	788
Kemupur	213.3	1,426
Sirsira	745.8	2,610
Icchhan Gora	88.6	938
Garhi Islam Nagar	369.4	2,830
Rampur Kasiha	76.3	926
Madhopur Pathak	70.8	923
Kaloo Jalalpur	156.3	1,653
Ratason	1,438.1	5,685
Khanpur Urf Birbhanpur	246.5	1,929
Jotbhadi Urf Erideeh	76	613
Piyarepur	54.8	1,569
Jai Rampur Pandey	98.4	770
Bairampur	302	2,597
Kanhpur Urf Basantpur	297.3	2,582
Ghooranpur	209.1	694
Kamaluddinpur	63.6	1,446
Nooruddinpur	482.9	3,882
Jaudaha	681.8	3,246
Lakhanpur	79.7	348
Gopalpur Anantpur	76.8	1,073
Kajipur Gosai	28.8	563
Lahureypur	91.9	1,278

== Notable people ==
- Deenanath Sewak (ex. M.L.A. 1974–1980)
