= Kakraha =

- Village
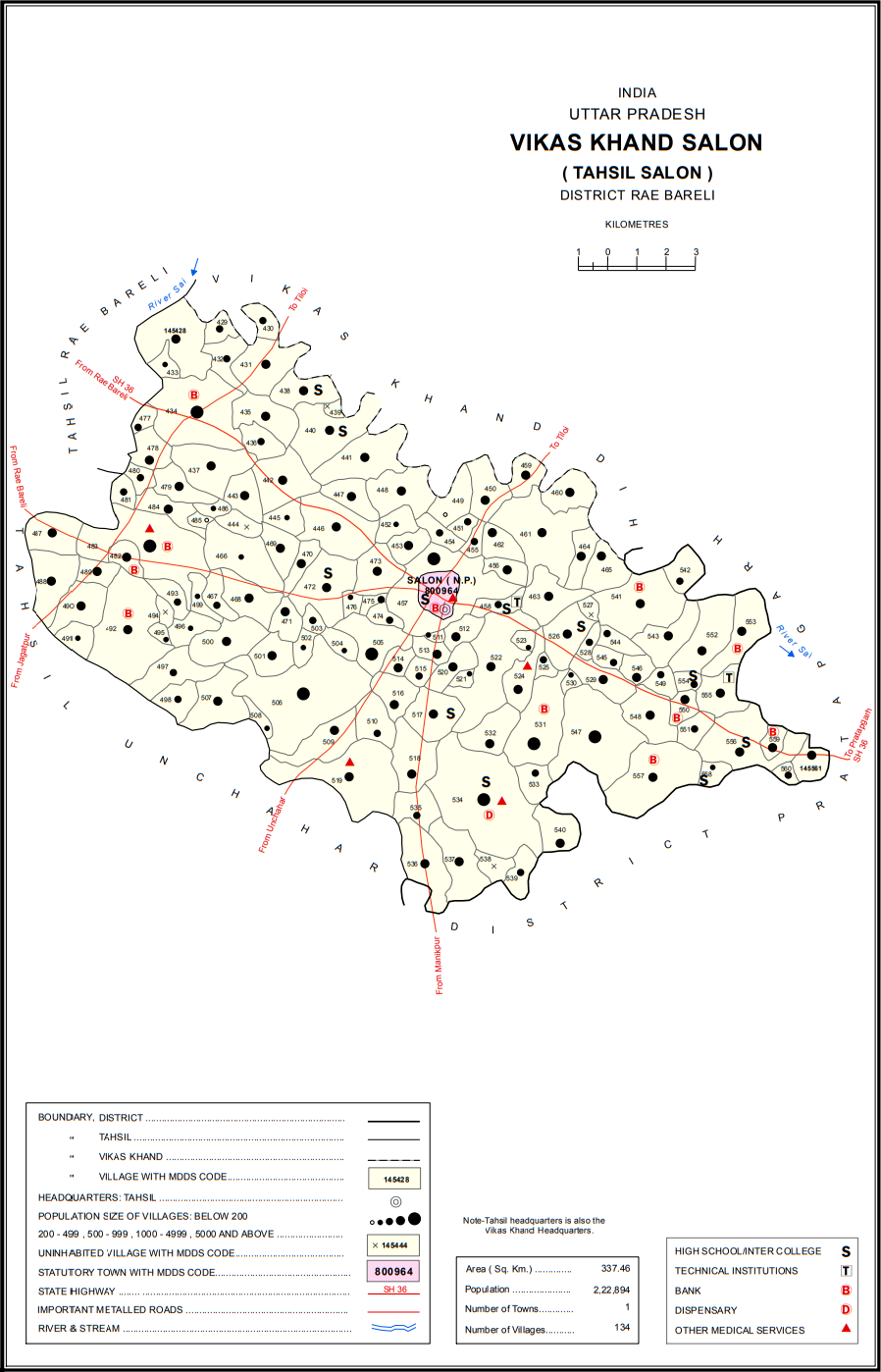
- Map showing Kakraha (#452) in Salon CD block

- Location in Uttar Pradesh, India
- Coordinates: 26.047976°N 81.433226°E
- Country: India
- State: Uttar Pradesh
- District: Raebareli

Area
  - Total: 1.033 km^{2} (0.399 sq mi)

Population (2011)
  - Total: 331
  - Density: 320/km^{2} (830/sq mi)

Languages
  - Official: Hindi
- Time zone: UTC+5:30 (IST)
- Vehicle registration: UP-35

Kakraha is a village in Salon block of Rae Bareli district, Uttar Pradesh, India. As of 2011, it has a population of 331 people, in 57 households. It has no schools and no healthcare facilities, and it does not host a permanent market or a periodic haat.

The 1961 census recorded Kakraha as comprising 2 hamlets, with a total population of 118 people (64 male and 54 female), in 28 households and 28 physical houses. The area of the village was given as 268 acres.

The 1981 census recorded Kakraha as having a population of 157 people, in 45 households, and having an area of 105.62 hectares. The main staple foods were given as wheat and juwar.
