= Ataganj Usri =

Ataganj Usri Atāganj Usri
- Village
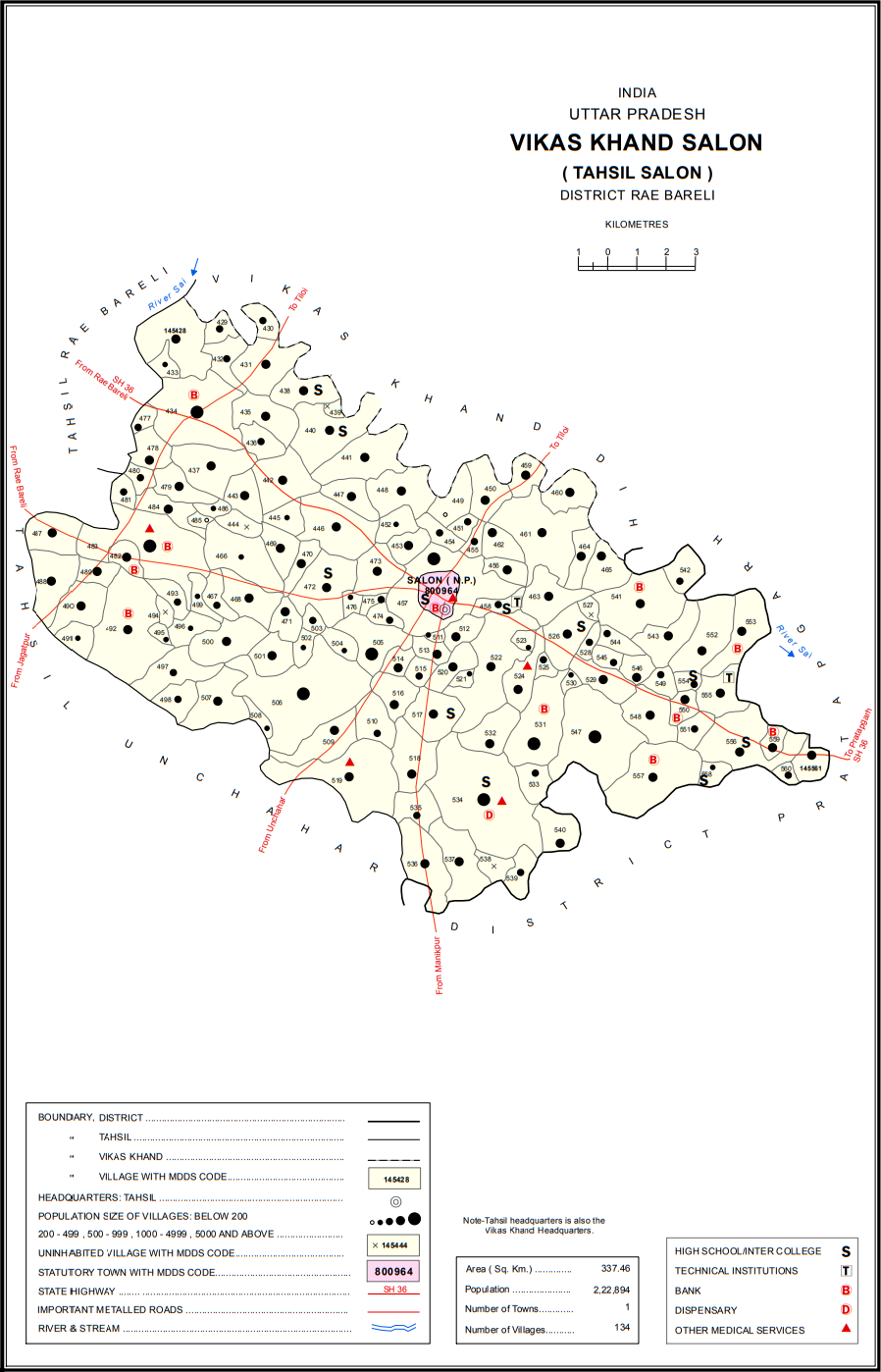
- Map showing Ataganj Usri (#463) in Salon CD block

- Location in Uttar Pradesh, India
- Coordinates: 26.027579°N 81.490777°E
- Country India: India
- State: Uttar Pradesh
- District: Raebareli

Area
  - Total: 2.746 km^{2} (1.060 sq mi)

Population (2011)
  - Total: 2,369
  - Density: 862.7/km^{2} (2,234/sq mi)

Languages
  - Official: Hindi
- Time zone: UTC+5:30 (IST)
- Vehicle registration: UP-35

Ataganj Usri is a village in Salon block of Rae Bareli district, Uttar Pradesh, India. It is located 3 km from Salon, the block and tehsil headquarters. As of 2011, Ataganj Usri has a population of 2,369 people, in 407 households. It has one primary school and no healthcare facilities and hosts neither a permanent market nor a periodic haat.

The 1961 census recorded Ataganj Usri as comprising 4 hamlets, with a total population of 950 people (461 male and 489 female), in 199 households and 193 physical houses. The area of the village was given as 679 acres.

The 1981 census recorded Ataganj Usri as having a population of 1,262 people, in 260 households, and having an area of 274.78 hectares. The main staple foods were given as wheat and rice.
