= Paksarawan =

Paksarawan Paksarāwān
- Village
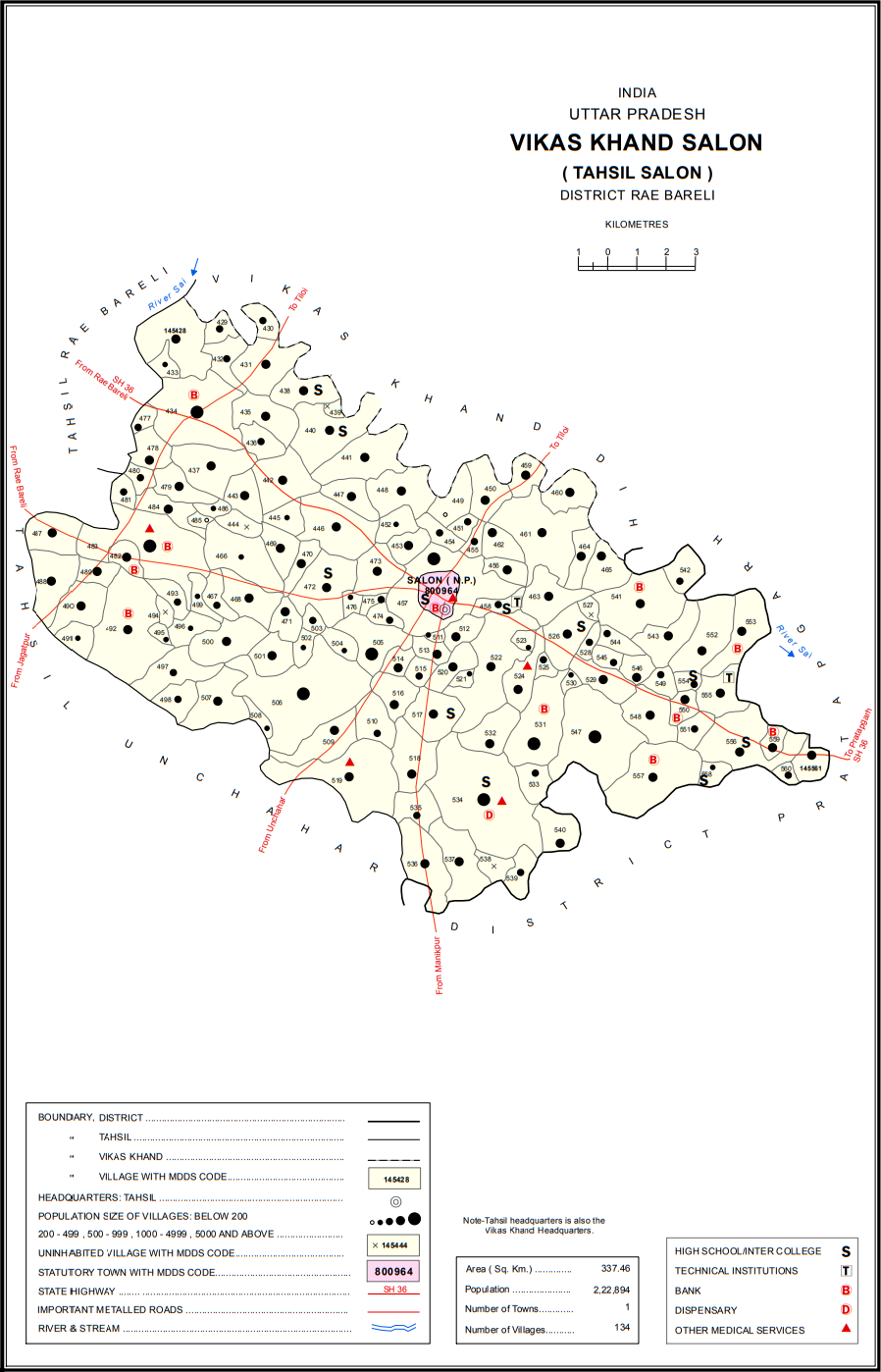
- Map showing Paksarawan (#519) in Salon CD block

- Location in Uttar Pradesh, India
- Coordinates: 25.9714°N 81.424744°E
- Country India: India
- State: Uttar Pradesh
- District: Raebareli

Area
  - Total: 6.018 km^{2} (2.324 sq mi)

Population (2011)
  - Total: 3,653
  - Density: 607.0/km^{2} (1,572/sq mi)

Languages
  - Official: Hindi
- Time zone: UTC+5:30 (IST)
- Vehicle registration: UP-35

Paksarawan is a village in Salon block of Rae Bareli district, Uttar Pradesh, India. It is located 45 km from Raebareli, the district headquarters, and it is connected to state highways. As of 2011, Paksarawan has a population of 3,653 people, in 624 households. It has one primary school and one primary health sub centre. It does not have a permanent market, but it does host a weekly haat on Wednesdays.

The 1961 census recorded Paksarawan as comprising 13 hamlets, with a total population of 1,525 people (725 male and 800 female), in 326 households and 299 physical houses. The area of the village was given as 1,468 acres and it had a post office at that point.

The 1981 census recorded Paksarawan as having a population of 2,288 people, in 579 households, and having an area of 594.08 hectares. The main staple foods were given as wheat and rice.
