= Sirsira =

Sirsira Pure Rathore Sirsira
- Village
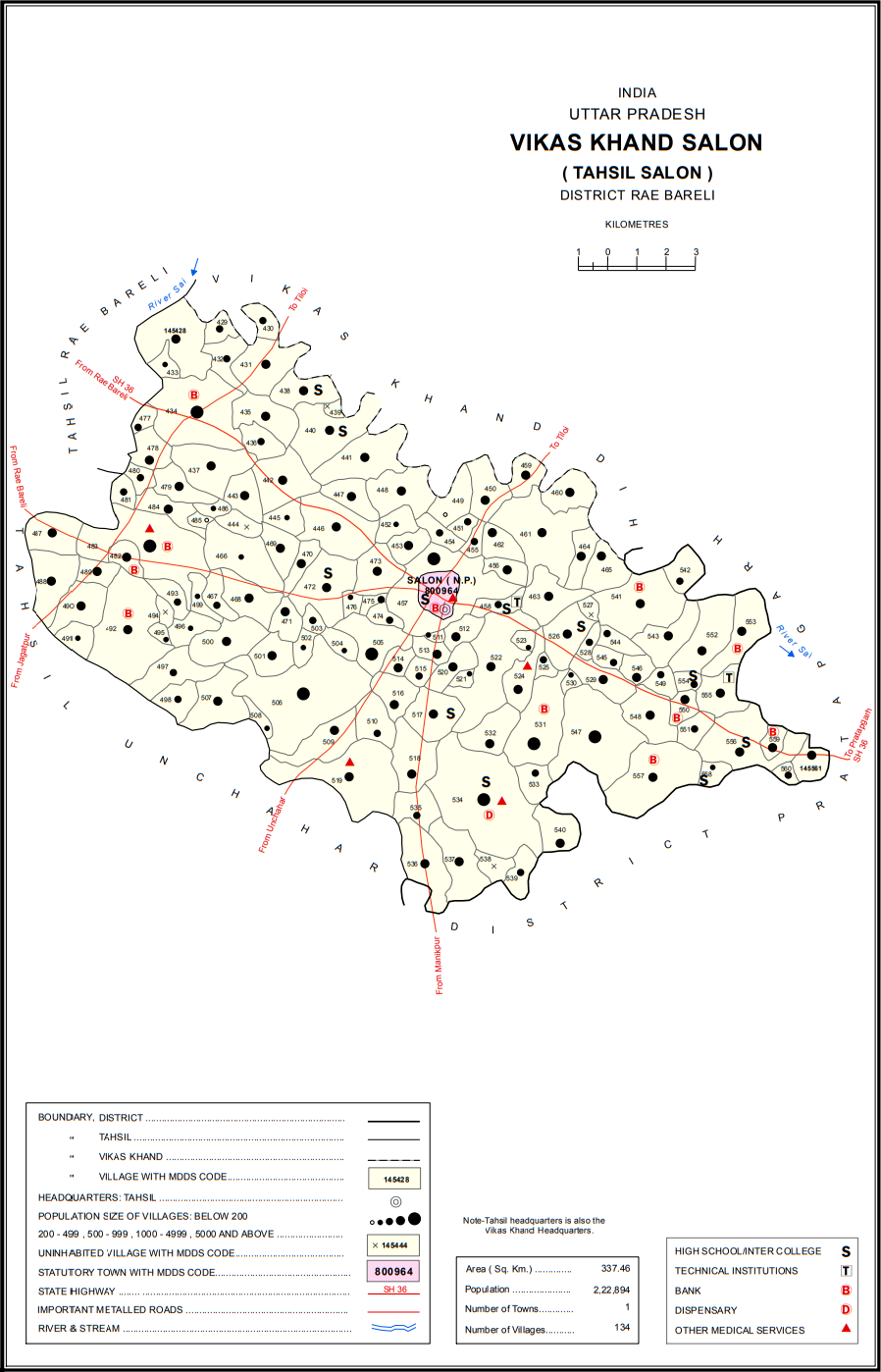
- Map showing Sirsira (#541) in Salon CD block

- Location in Uttar Pradesh, India
- Coordinates: 26.020496°N 81.524791°E
- Country: India
- State: Uttar Pradesh
- District: Raebareli

Area
  - Total: 7.458 km^{2} (2.880 sq mi)

Population (2011)
  - Total: 2,610
  - Density: 350/km^{2} (906/sq mi)

Languages
  - Official: Hindi
- Time zone: UTC+5:30 (IST)
- Vehicle registration: UP-33

Sirsira is a village in Salon block of Rae Bareli district, Uttar Pradesh, India. It is located 11 km from Salon, the block and tehsil headquarters. As of 2011, Sirsira has a population of 2,610 people, in 477 households. It has one primary school and no healthcare facilities, and it hosts both a permanent market and a periodic haat.

The 1961 census recorded Sirsira (as "Sirsara") as comprising 7 hamlets, with a total population of 1,127 people (545 male and 582 female), in 248 households and 248 physical houses. The area of the village was given as 1,156 acres, and it had two small textile manufacturers at that point.

The 1981 census recorded Sirsira as having a population of 1,489 people, in 377 households, and having an area of 475.51 hectares. The main staple foods were given as wheat and rice.
