= Harkishanpur Tikra =

- Village
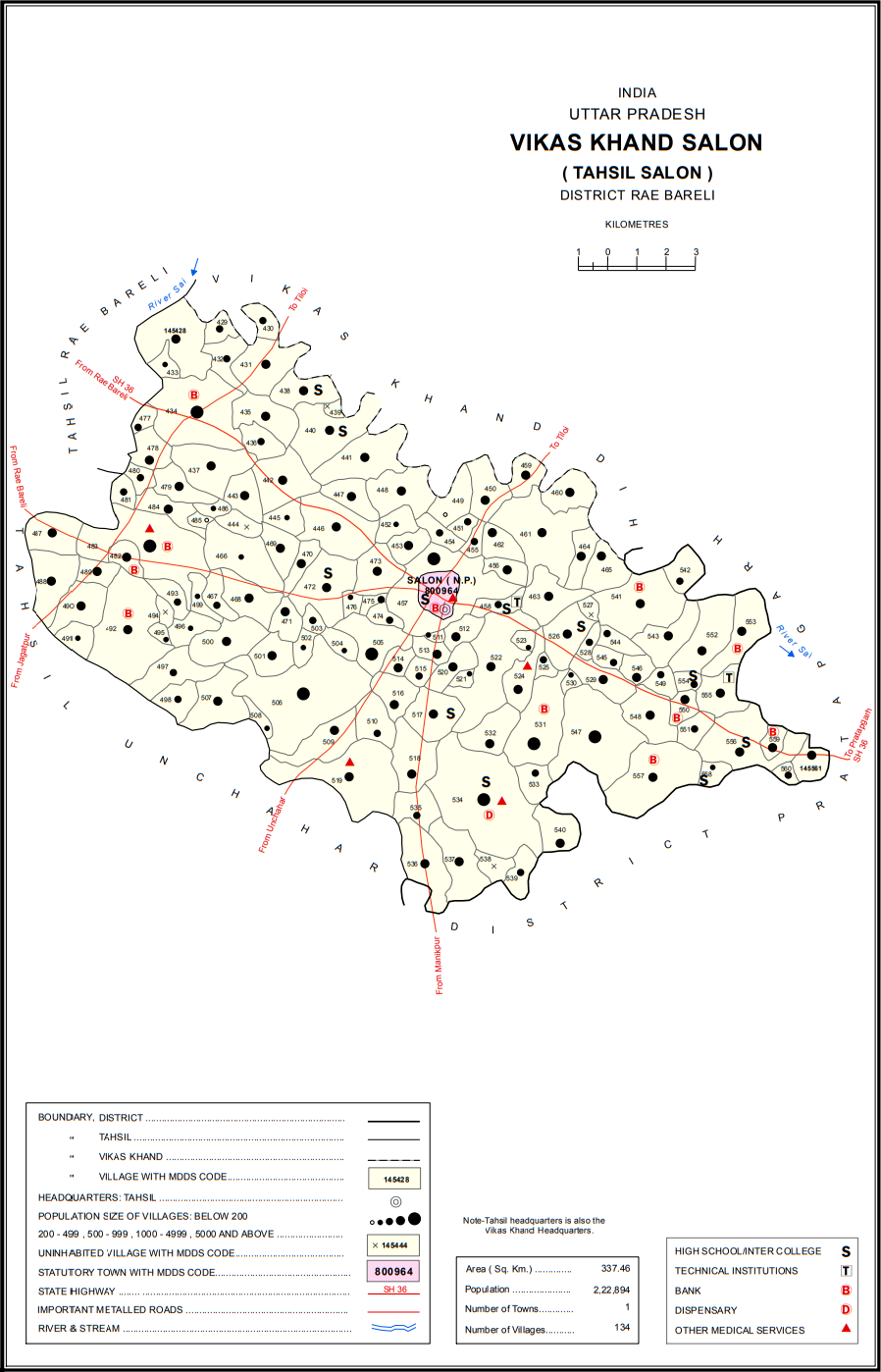
- Map showing Harkishanpur Tikra (#496) in Salon CD block

- Location in Uttar Pradesh, India
- Coordinates: 26.016857°N 81.359884°E
- Country India: India
- State: Uttar Pradesh
- District: Raebareli

Area
  - Total: 0.622 km^{2} (0.240 sq mi)

Population (2011)
  - Total: 423
  - Density: 680/km^{2} (1,760/sq mi)

Languages
  - Official: Hindi
- Time zone: UTC+5:30 (IST)
- Vehicle registration: UP-35

Harkishanpur Tikra is a village in Salon block of Rae Bareli district, Uttar Pradesh, India. It is located 32 km from Raebareli, the district headquarters. As of 2011, Harkishanpur Tikra has a population of 423 people, in 76 households. It has no schools and no healthcare facilities.

The 1961 census recorded Harkishanpur Tikra as comprising 1 hamlet, with a total population of 152 people (74 male and 78 female), in 31 households and 31 physical houses. The area of the village was given as 153 acres.

The 1981 census recorded Harkishanpur Tikra (as "Harkishunpur Tikara") as having a population of 185 people, in 42 households, and having an area of 61.91 hectares. The main staple foods were given as wheat and rice.
