= Kalu Jalalpur =

Kalu Jalalpur Kālu Jalālpur
- Village
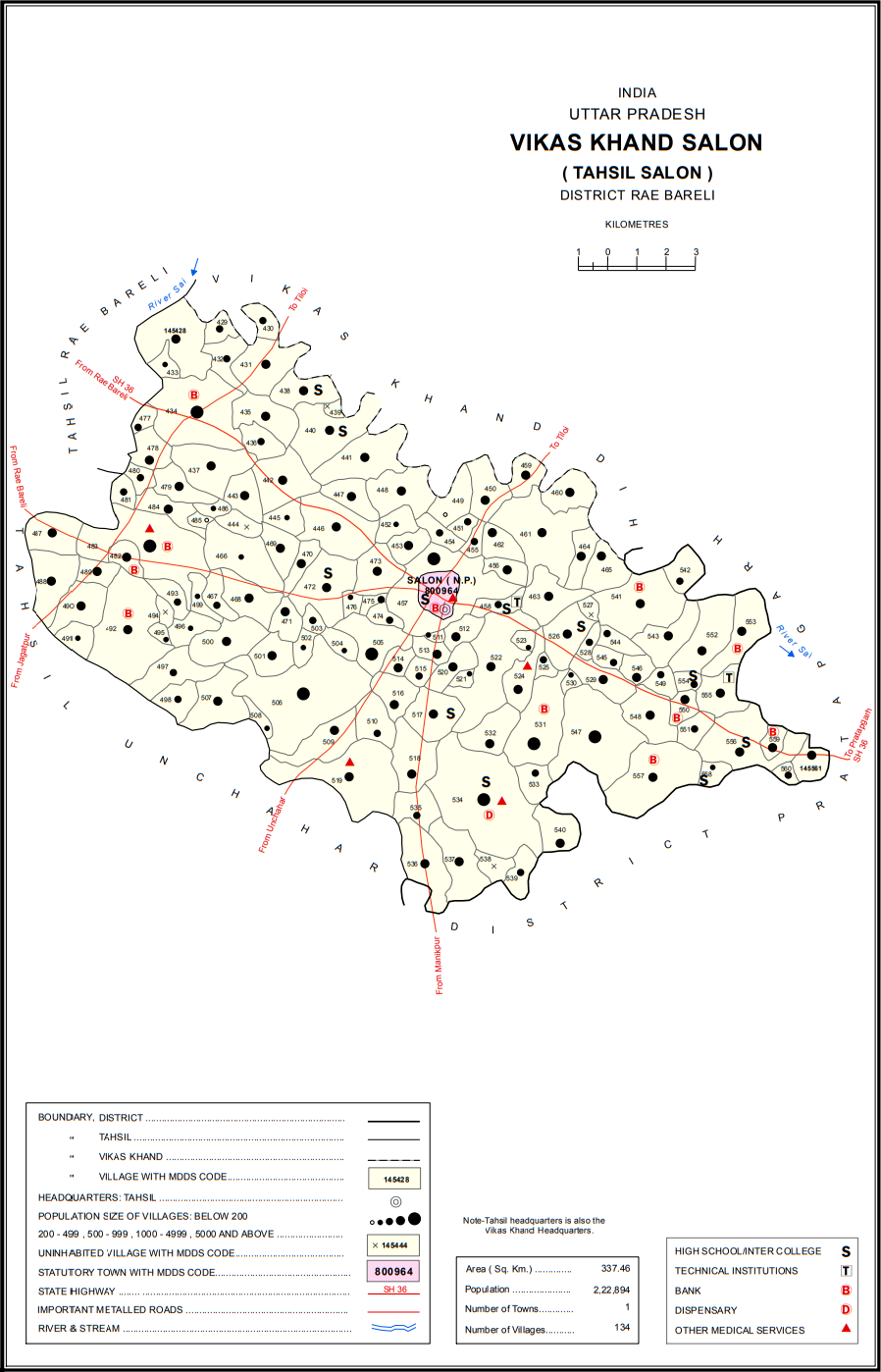
- Map showing Kalu Jalalpur (#546) in Salon CD block

- Location in Uttar Pradesh, India
- Coordinates: 26.003777°N 81.52752°E
- Country: India
- State: Uttar Pradesh
- District: Raebareli

Area
  - Total: 1.563 km^{2} (0.603 sq mi)

Population (2011)
  - Total: 1,653
  - Density: 1,058/km^{2} (2,739/sq mi)

Languages
  - Official: Hindi
- Time zone: UTC+5:30 (IST)
- PIN: 229227
- Vehicle registration: UP-35

Kalu Jalalpur is a village in Salon block of Rae Bareli district, Uttar Pradesh, India. It is located 38 km from Raebareli, the district headquarters. As of 2011, Kalu Jalalpur has a population of 1,653 people, in 269 households. It has one primary school and no healthcare facilities, as well as a sub post office. It does not host a permanent market or a periodic haat.

The 1961 census recorded Kalu Jalalpur as comprising 4 hamlets, with a total population of 536 people (272 male and 264 female), in 115 households and 107 physical houses. The area of the village was given as 280 acres.

The 1981 census recorded Kalu Jalalpur as having a population of 790 people, in 191 households, and having an area of 114.52 hectares. The main staple foods were given as wheat and rice.
