= Madhopur Ninaiya =

Madhopur Ninaiya Mādhopur Ninaiyān
- Village
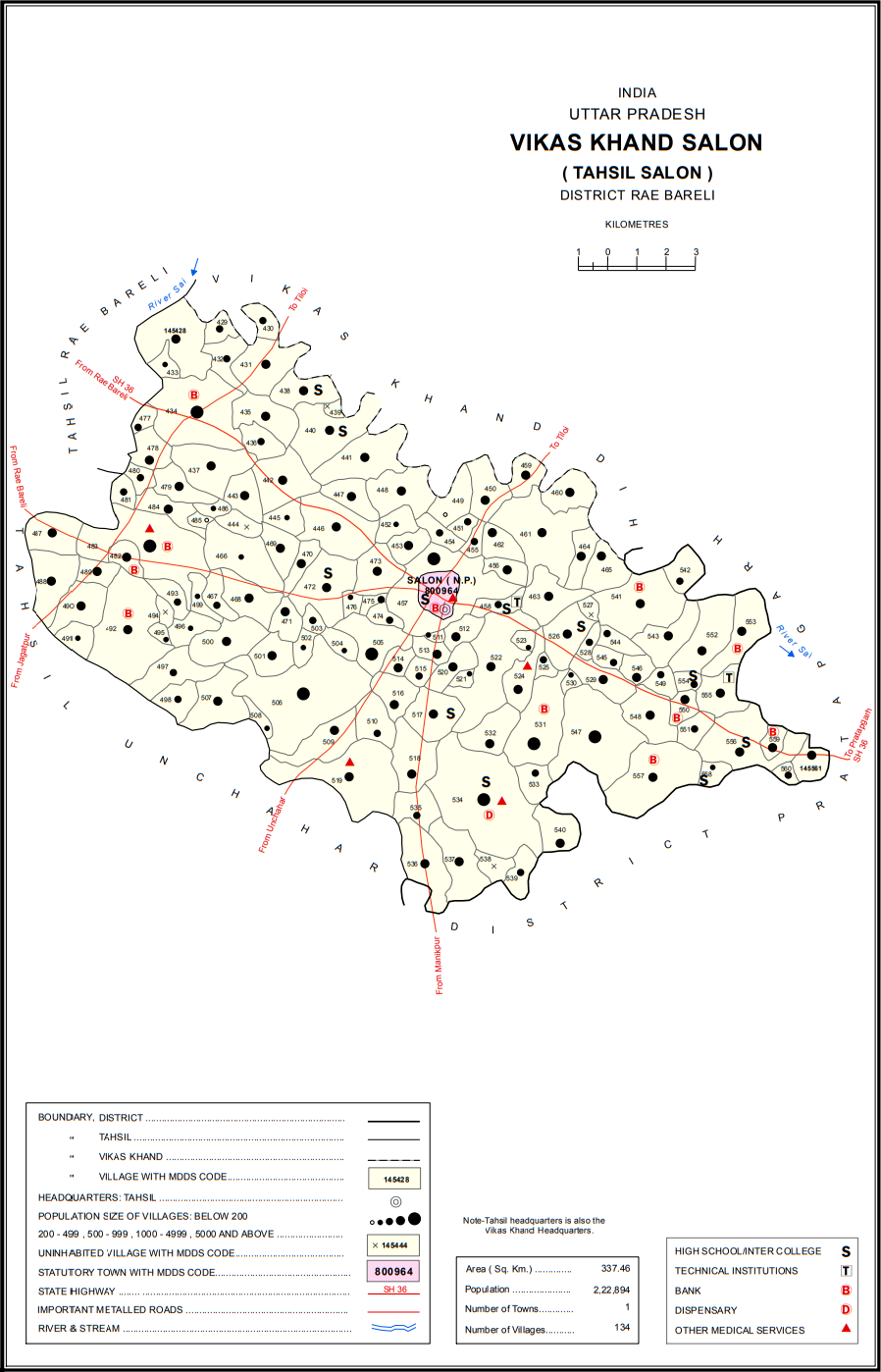
- Map showing Madhopur Ninaiya (#465) in Salon CD block

- Location in Uttar Pradesh, India
- Coordinates: 26.036539°N 81.509086°E
- Country: India
- State: Uttar Pradesh
- District: Raebareli

Area
  - Total: 2.326 km^{2} (0.898 sq mi)

Population (2011)
  - Total: 1,534
  - Density: 659.5/km^{2} (1,708/sq mi)

Languages
  - Official: Hindi
- Time zone: UTC+5:30 (IST)
- Vehicle registration: UP-35

Madhopur Ninaiya is a village in Salon block of Rae Bareli district, Uttar Pradesh, India. It is located 7 km from Salon, the block and tehsil headquarters. As of 2011, Madhopur Ninaiya has a population of 1,534 people, in 296 households. It has one primary school and no healthcare facilities, and it does not host a permanent market or a periodic haat.

The 1961 census recorded Madhopur Ninaiya as comprising 3 hamlets, with a total population of 586 people (310 male and 276 female), in 122 households and 119 physical houses. The area of the village was given as 568 acres.

The 1981 census recorded Madhopur Ninaiya as having a population of 747 people, in 200 households, and having an area of 231.48 hectares. The main staple foods were given as wheat and juwar.
