= Bisaiya =

- Village
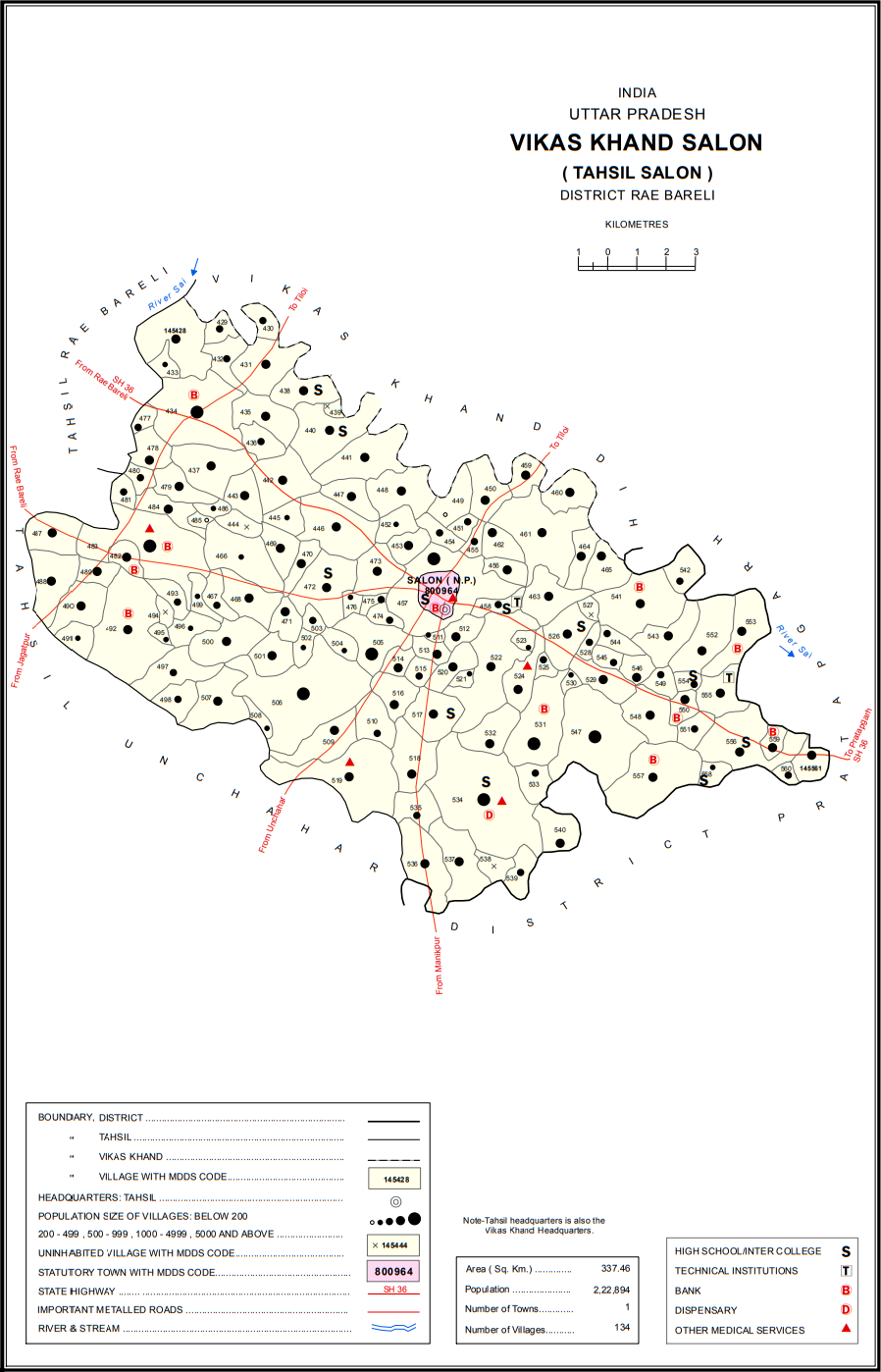
- Map showing Bisaiya (#500) in Salon CD block

- Location in Uttar Pradesh, India
- Coordinates: 26.018669°N 81.379156°E
- Country India: India
- State: Uttar Pradesh
- District: Raebareli

Area
  - Total: 5.609 km^{2} (2.166 sq mi)

Population (2011)
  - Total: 2,916
  - Density: 519.9/km^{2} (1,346/sq mi)

Languages
  - Official: Hindi
- Time zone: UTC+5:30 (IST)
- Vehicle registration: UP-35

Bisaiya is a village in Salon block of Rae Bareli district, Uttar Pradesh, India. It is located 34 km from Raebareli, the district headquarters. As of 2011, Bisaiya has a population of 2,916 people, in 543 households. It has one primary school and no healthcare facilities.

The 1961 census recorded Bisaiya as comprising 6 hamlets, with a total population of 1,175 people (602 male and 573 female), in 271 households and 240 physical houses. The area of the village was given as 1,450 acres.

The 1981 census recorded Bisaiya as having a population of 1,515 people, in 369 households, and having an area of 560.90 hectares. The main staple foods were given as wheat and rice.
