= Garhi Islamnagar =

Garhi Islamnagar Garhi Islāmnagar
- Village
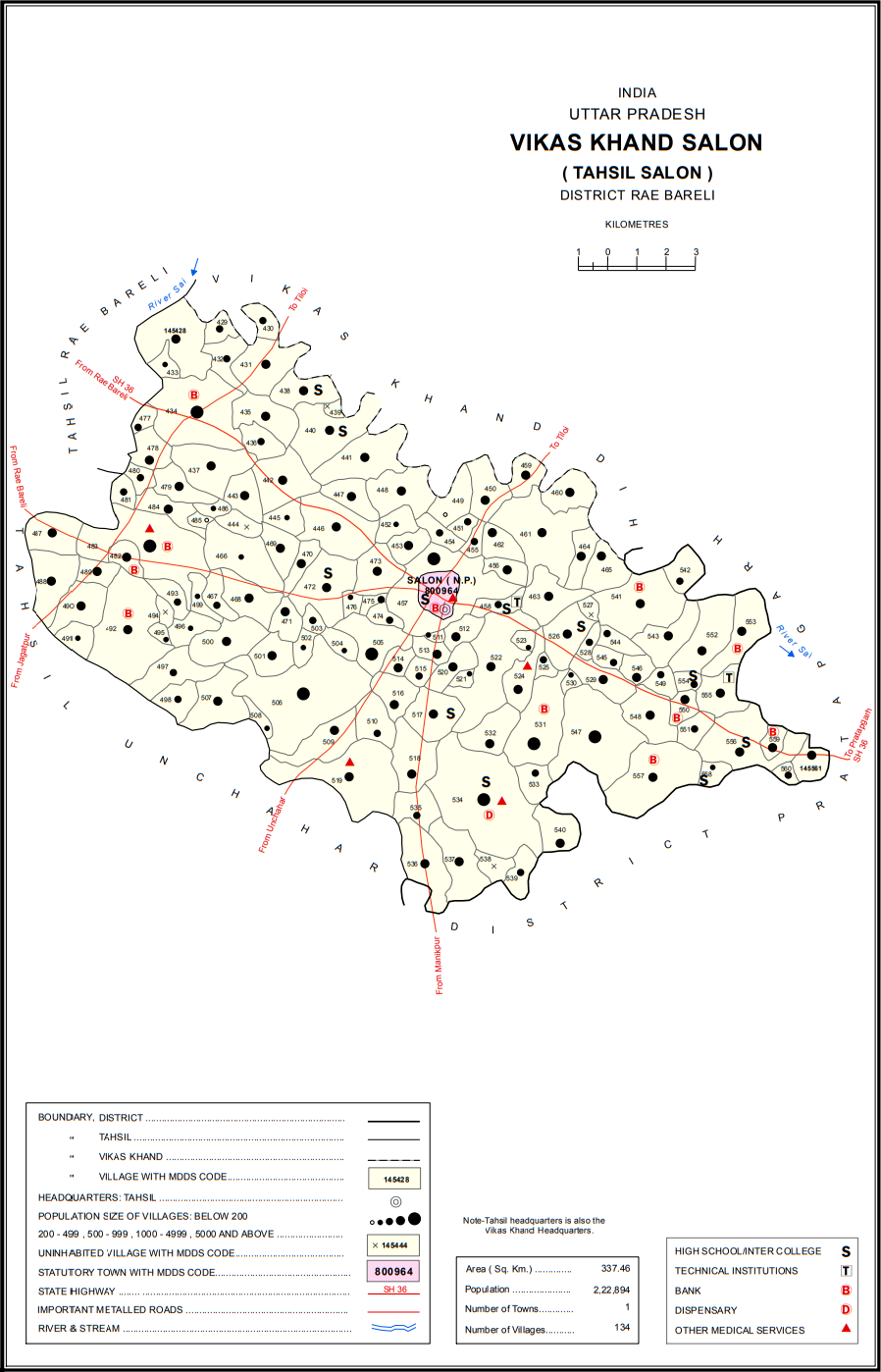
- Map showing Garhi Islamnagar (#543) in Salon CD block

- Location in Uttar Pradesh, India
- Coordinates: 26.011404°N 81.535083°E
- Country: India
- State: Uttar Pradesh
- District: Raebareli

Area
  - Total: 3.694 km^{2} (1.426 sq mi)

Population (2011)
  - Total: 2,830
  - Density: 766/km^{2} (1,980/sq mi)

Languages
  - Official: Hindi
- Time zone: UTC+5:30 (IST)
- Vehicle registration: UP-35

Garhi Islamnagar is a village in Salon block of Rae Bareli district, Uttar Pradesh, India. As of 2011, it has a population of 2,830 people, in 503 households. It has one primary school and no healthcare facilities, and it hosts a periodic haat but not a permanent market.

The 1961 census recorded Garhi Islamnagar as comprising 7 hamlets, with a total population of 1,197 people (576 male and 621 female), in 236 households and 227 physical houses. The area of the village was given as 559 acres.

The 1981 census recorded Garhi Islamnagar as having a population of 1,455 people, in 394 households, and having an area of 225.81 hectares. The main staple foods were given as wheat and rice.
