= Sanda Saidan =

Sanda Saidan Sānda Saidan
- Village
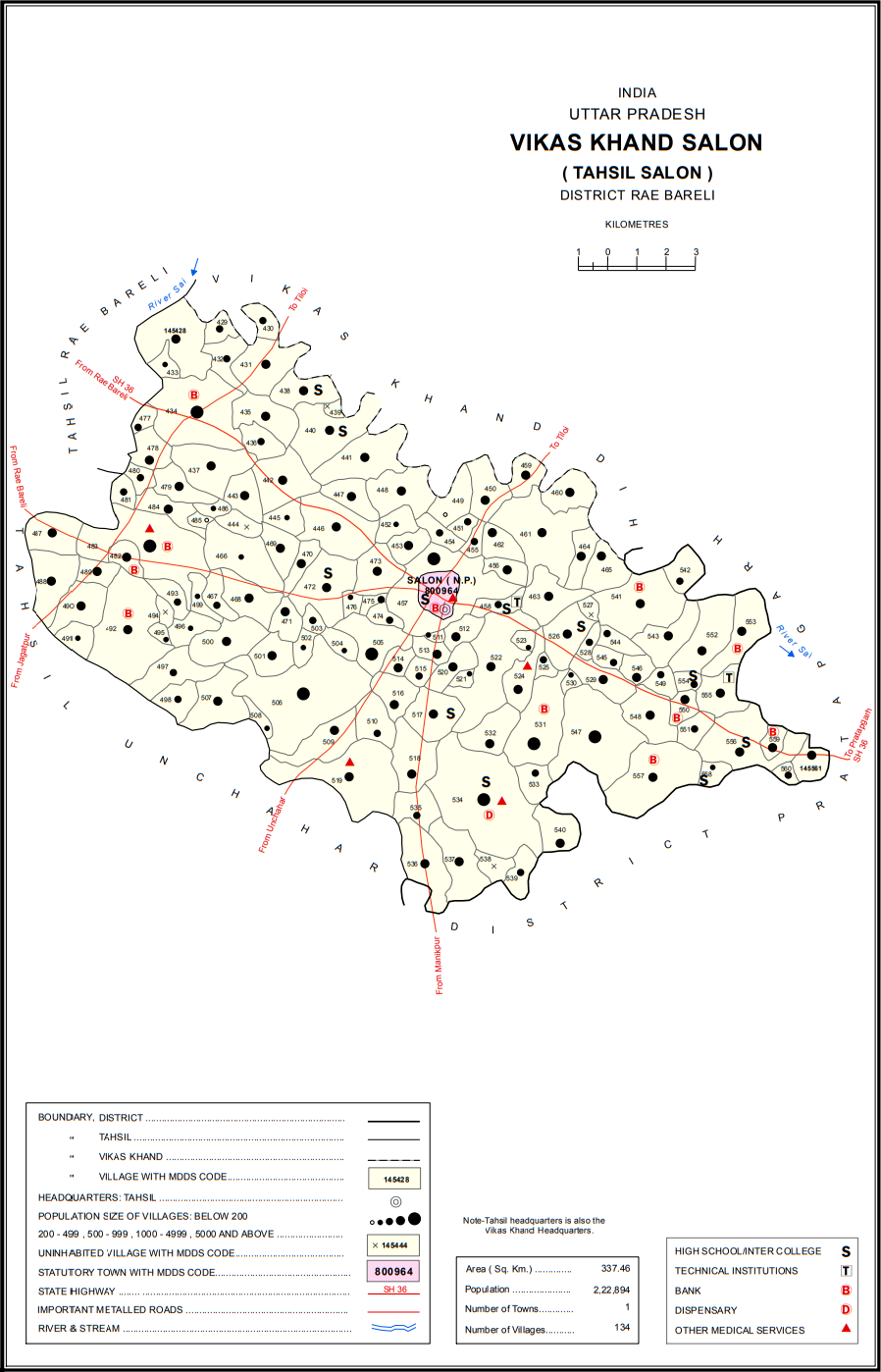
- Map showing Sanda Saidan (#462) in Salon CD block

- Location in Uttar Pradesh, India
- Coordinates: 26.039898°N 81.473248°E
- Country India: India
- State: Uttar Pradesh
- District: Raebareli

Area
  - Total: 1.906 km^{2} (0.736 sq mi)

Population (2011)
  - Total: 3,283
  - Density: 1,722/km^{2} (4,461/sq mi)

Languages
  - Official: Hindi
- Time zone: UTC+5:30 (IST)
- PIN: 229127
- Vehicle registration: UP-35

Sanda Saidan is a village in Salon block of Rae Bareli district, Uttar Pradesh, India. It is located 3 km from Salon, the block and tehsil headquarters. As of 2011, Sanda Saidan has a population of 3,283 people, in 592 households. It has one primary school and no healthcare facilities. It does not host a permanent market or periodic haat.

The 1961 census recorded Sanda Saidan (as "Sanda Siadan") as comprising 6 hamlets, with a total population of 933 people (456 male and 467 female), in 184 households and 177 physical houses. The area of the village was given as 475 acres.

The 1981 census recorded Sanda Saidan as having a population of 1,460 people, in 356 households, and having an area of 189.90 hectares. The main staple foods were given as wheat and rice.
