= Parhari =

Parhari Parhāri
- Village
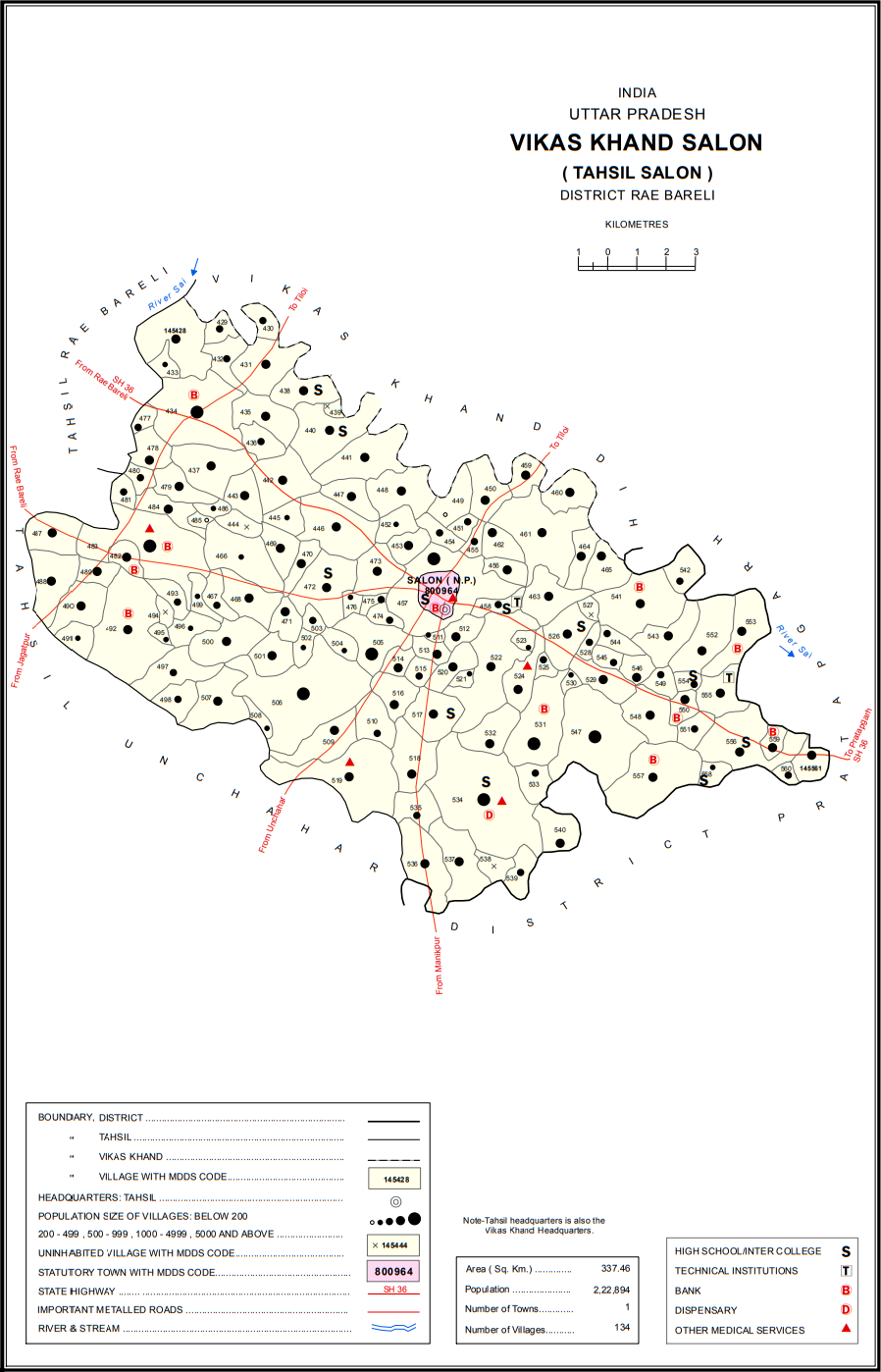
- Map showing Parhari (#489) in Salon CD block

- Location in Uttar Pradesh, India
- Coordinates: 26.035637°N 81.330786°E
- Country: India
- State: Uttar Pradesh
- District: Raebareli

Area
  - Total: 0.931 km^{2} (0.359 sq mi)

Population (2011)
  - Total: 1,155
  - Density: 1,240/km^{2} (3,210/sq mi)

Languages
  - Official: Hindi
- Time zone: UTC+5:30 (IST)
- Vehicle registration: UP-35

Parhari is a village in Salon block of Rae Bareli district, Uttar Pradesh, India. It is located 26 km from Raebareli, the district headquarters. As of 2011, Parhari has a population of 1,155 people, in 180 households. It has one primary school and no healthcare facilities, and it does not host a permanent market or a periodic haat.

The 1961 census recorded Parhari as comprising 3 hamlets, with a total population of 458 people (248 male and 210 female), in 94 households and 88 physical houses. The area of the village was given as 222 acres.

The 1981 census recorded Parhari as having a population of 686 people, in 159 households, and having an area of 689.84 hectares. The main staple foods were given as wheat and rice.
