= Runipur =

Runipur Rūnīpur
- Village
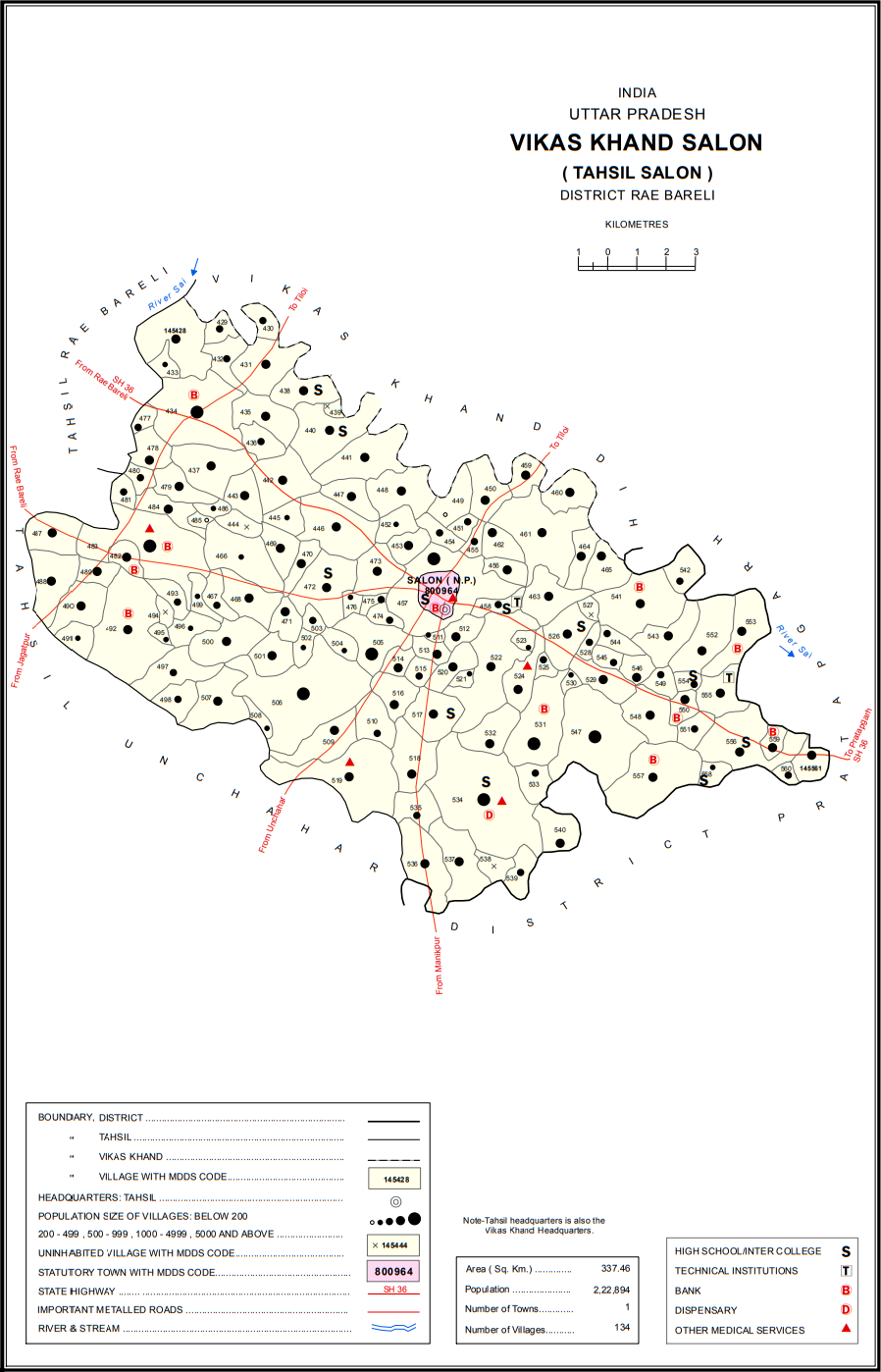
- Map showing Runipur (#510) in Salon CD block

- Location in Uttar Pradesh, India
- Coordinates: 25.989364°N 81.428972°E
- Country India: India
- State: Uttar Pradesh
- District: Raebareli

Area
  - Total: 1.761 km^{2} (0.680 sq mi)

Population (2011)
  - Total: 813
  - Density: 462/km^{2} (1,200/sq mi)

Languages
  - Official: Hindi
- Time zone: UTC+5:30 (IST)
- Vehicle registration: UP-35

Runipur is a village in Salon block of Rae Bareli district, Uttar Pradesh, India. It is located 36 km from Raebareli, the district headquarters. As of 2011, Runipur has a population of 813 people, in 145 households. It has one primary school and no healthcare facilities.

The 1961 census recorded Runipur (as "Roonipur") as comprising 3 hamlets, with a total population of 228 people (109 male and 119 female), in 46 households and 35 physical houses. The area of the village was given as 447 acres.

The 1981 census recorded Runipur (as "Roonipur") as having a population of 388 people, in 90 households, and having an area of 176.03 hectares. The main staple foods were given as wheat and rice.
