= Ratason =

Ratason Ratāsaun
- Village
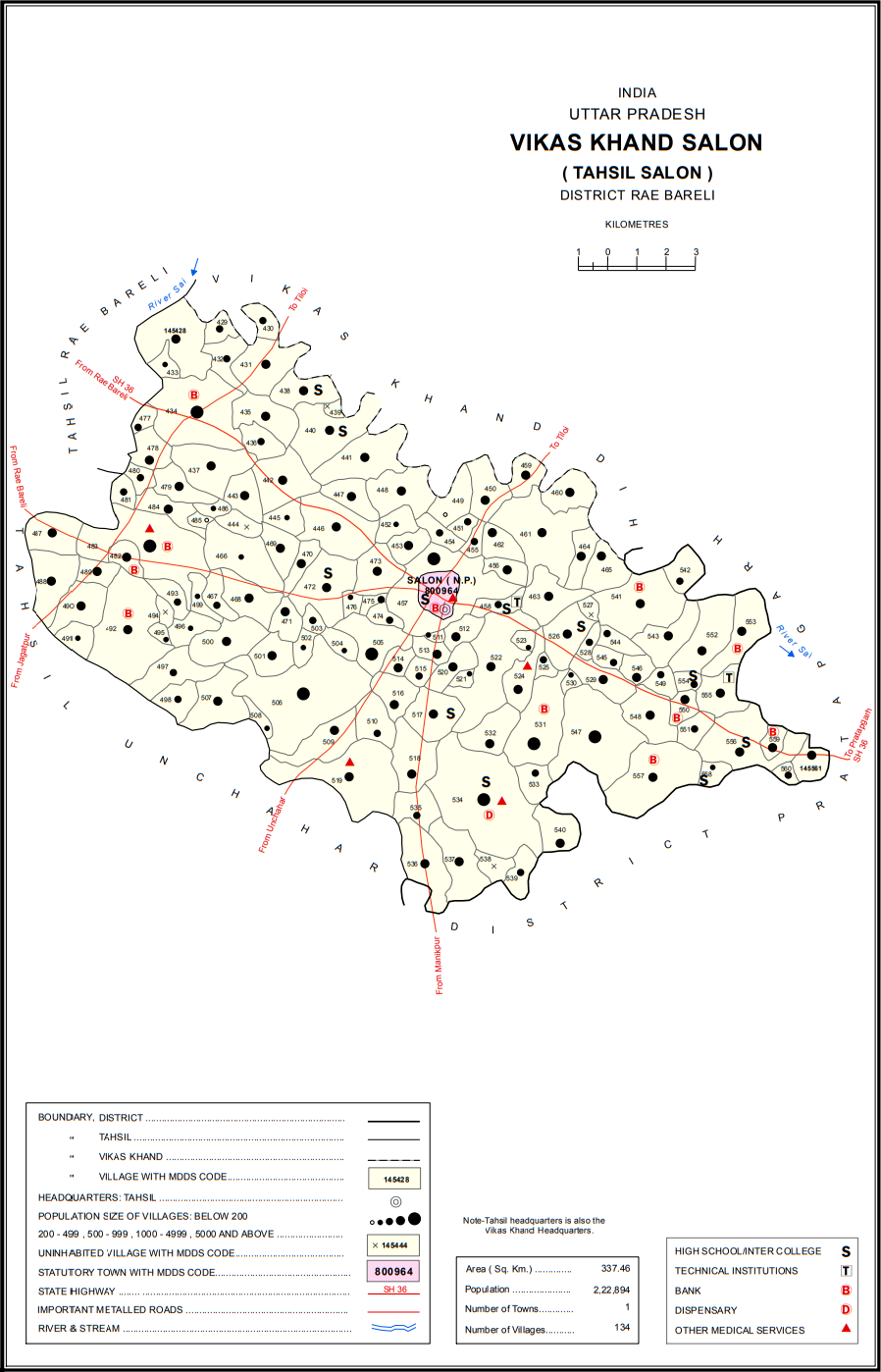
- Map showing Ratason (#547) in Salon CD block

- Location in Uttar Pradesh, India
- Coordinates: 25.986296°N 81.505299°E
- Country: India
- State: Uttar Pradesh
- District: Raebareli

Area
  - Total: 14.381 km^{2} (5.553 sq mi)

Population (2011)
  - Total: 5,685
  - Density: 395.3/km^{2} (1,024/sq mi)

Languages
  - Official: Hindi
- Time zone: UTC+5:30 (IST)
- Vehicle registration: UP-35

Ratason is a village in Salon block of Rae Bareli district, Uttar Pradesh, India. It is located 43 km from Raebareli, the district headquarters. As of 2011, Ratason has a population of 5,685 people, in 956 households. It has one primary school and no healthcare facilities, as well as a sub post office, and it hosts both a permanent market and a periodic haat. Agriculturally, major crops grown here include wheat, rice, and potatoes.

The 1961 census recorded Ratason as comprising 11 hamlets, with a total population of 1,728 people (891 male and 837 female), in 376 households and 368 physical houses. The area of the village was given as 1,726 acres.

The 1981 census recorded Ratason as having a population of 2,860 people, in 670 households, and having an area of 698.49 hectares.
