= Aunanis =

Aunanis Aunānis
- Village
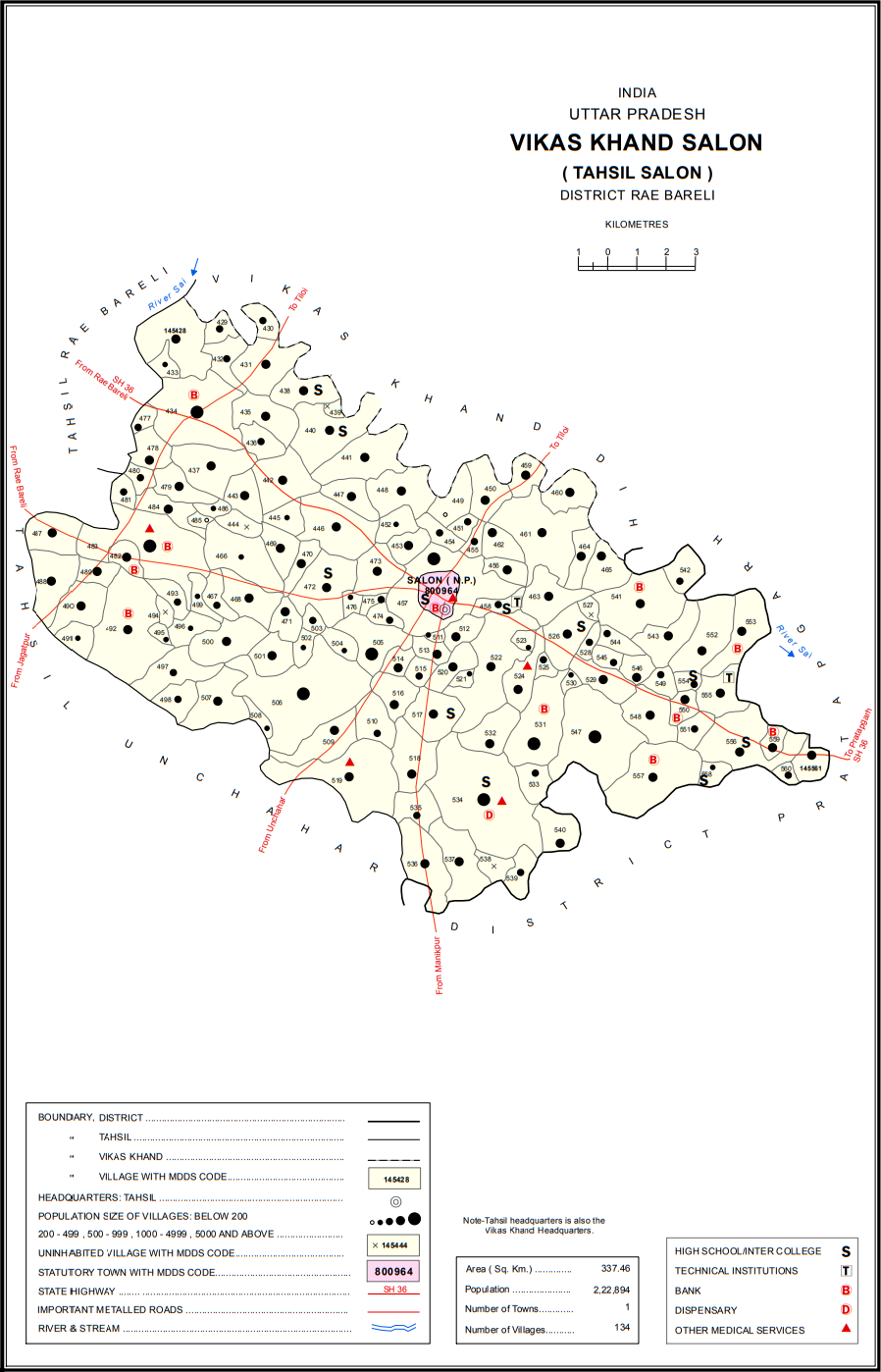
- Map showing Aunanis (#456) in Salon CD block

- Location in Uttar Pradesh, India
- Coordinates: 26.0307°N 81.473952°E
- Country India: India
- State: Uttar Pradesh
- District: Raebareli

Area
  - Total: 0.766 km^{2} (0.296 sq mi)

Population (2011)
  - Total: 1,115
  - Density: 1,460/km^{2} (3,770/sq mi)

Languages
  - Official: Hindi
- Time zone: UTC+5:30 (IST)
- PIN: 229127
- Vehicle registration: UP-35

Aunanis is a village in Salon block of Rae Bareli district, Uttar Pradesh, India. It is located 2 km from Salon, the block and tehsil headquarters. As of 2011, Aunanis has a population of 1,115 people, in 209 households. It has one primary school and no healthcare facilities and is located on major district roads. It hosts neither a permanent market nor a periodic haat.

The 1961 census recorded Aunanis (as "Auna Nis") as comprising 2 hamlets, with a total population of 393 people (206 male and 187 female), in 86 households and 86 physical houses. The area of the village was given as 176 acres.

The 1981 census recorded Aunanis as having a population of 572 people, in 200 households, and having an area of 77.30 hectares. The main staple foods were given as wheat and rice.
