= Kemupur =

Kemupur Kemūpur
- Village
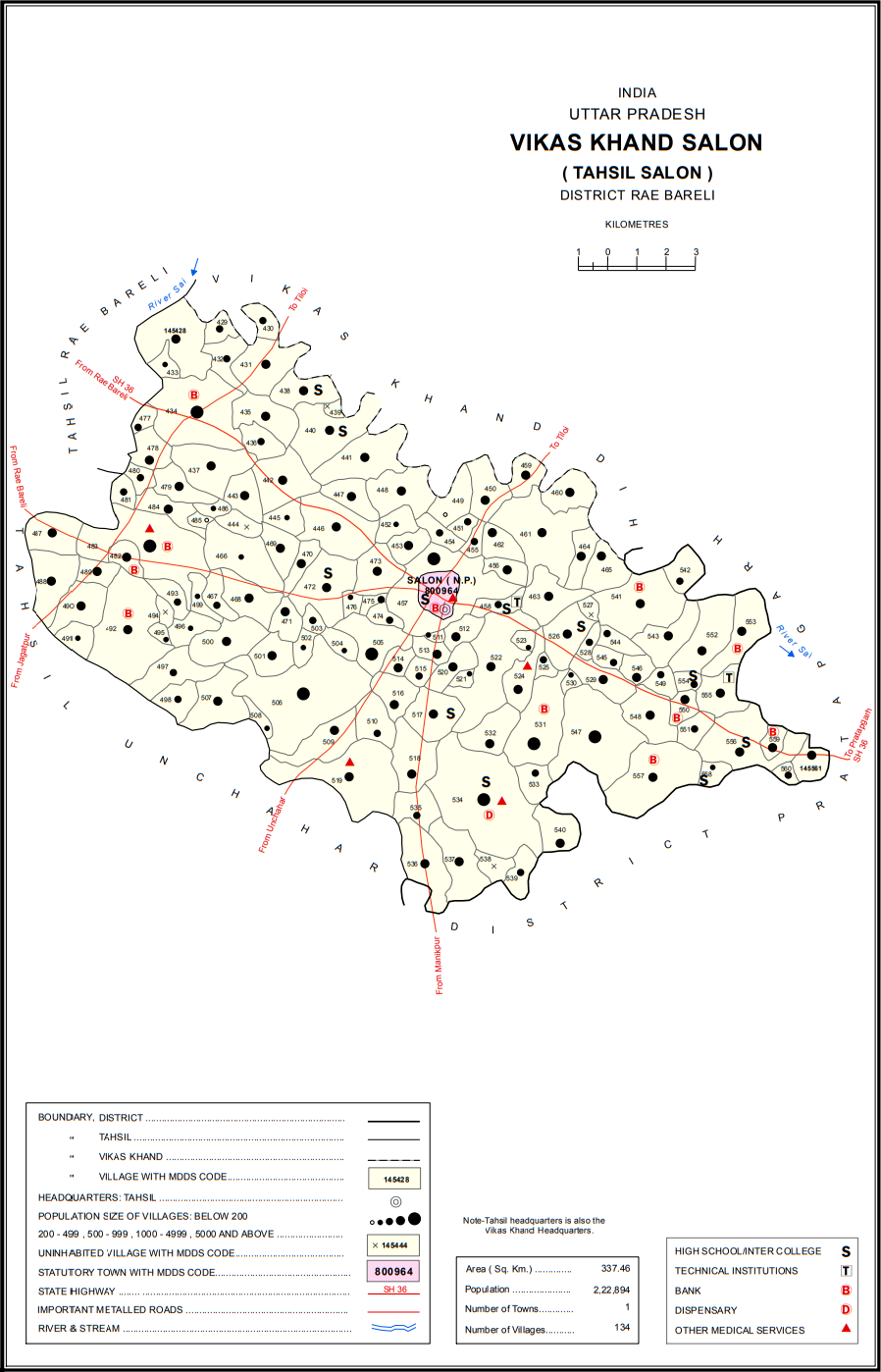
- Map showing Kemupur (#540) in Salon CD block

- Location in Uttar Pradesh, India
- Coordinates: 25.957272°N 81.498698°E
- Country India: India
- State: Uttar Pradesh
- District: Raebareli

Area
  - Total: 2.133 km^{2} (0.824 sq mi)

Population (2011)
  - Total: 1,426
  - Density: 668.5/km^{2} (1,732/sq mi)

Languages
  - Official: Hindi
- Time zone: UTC+5:30 (IST)
- Vehicle registration: UP-35

Kemupur is a village in Salon block of Rae Bareli district, Uttar Pradesh, India. It is located 40 km from Raebareli, the district headquarters. As of 2011, Kemupur has a population of 1,426 people, in 226 households. It has no schools and no healthcare facilities. It has a permanent market and it does not host a periodic haat.

The 1961 census recorded Kemupur as comprising 3 hamlets, with a total population of 472 people (242 male and 230 female), in 116 households and 103 physical houses. The area of the village was given as 539 acres.

The 1981 census recorded Kemupur (as "Kemoopur") as having a population of 707 people, in 195 households, and having an area of 206.23 hectares. The main staple foods were given as wheat and rice.
