= Sonbarsa, Raebareli =

Sonbarsa
- Village
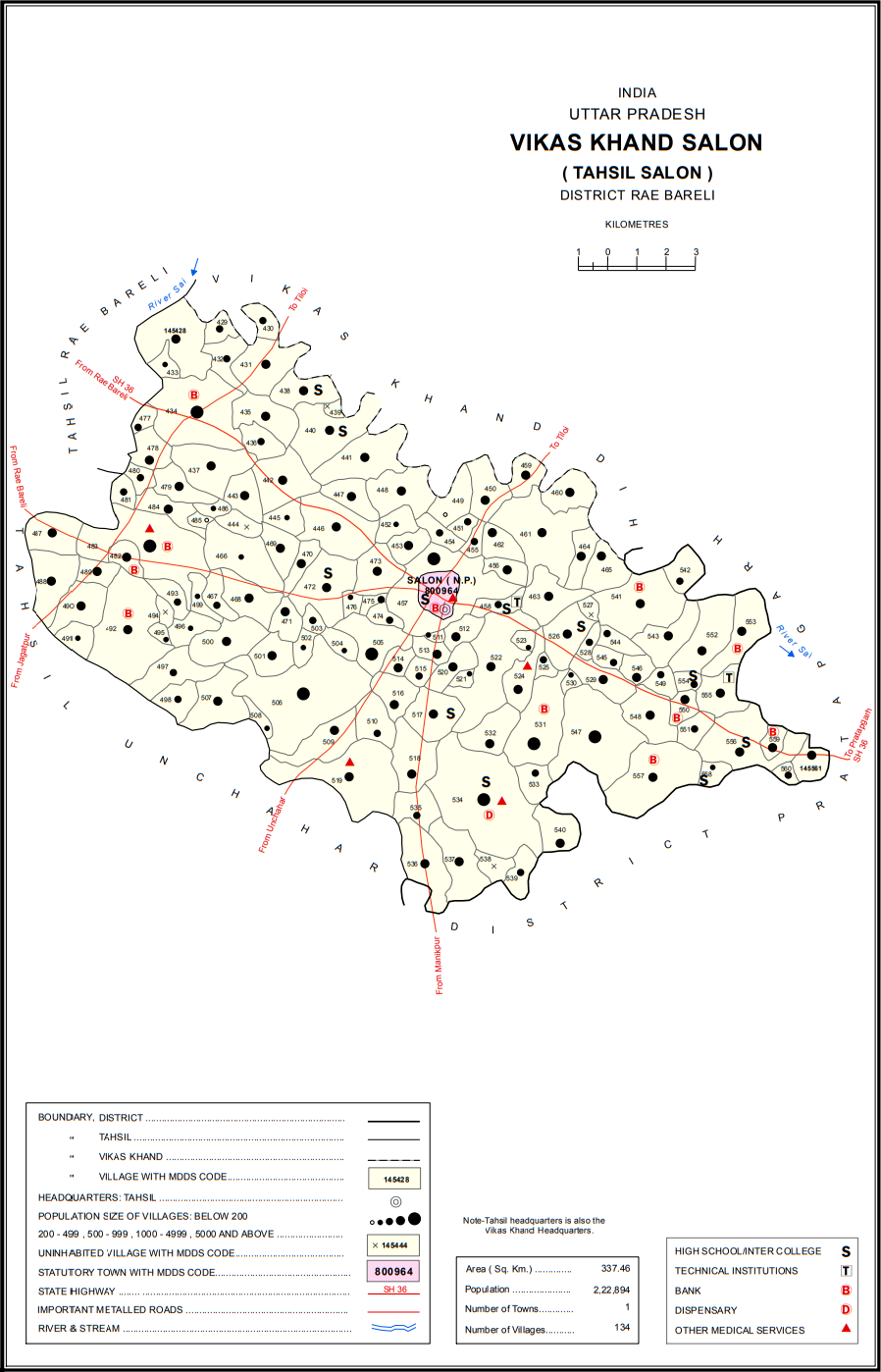
- Map showing Sonbarsa (#471) in Salon CD block

- Location in Uttar Pradesh, India
- Coordinates: 26.017783°N 81.395527°E
- Country India: India
- State: Uttar Pradesh
- District: Raebareli

Area
  - Total: 5.513 km^{2} (2.129 sq mi)

Population (2011)
  - Total: 1,041
  - Density: 188.8/km^{2} (489.1/sq mi)

Languages
  - Official: Hindi
- Time zone: UTC+5:30 (IST)
- Vehicle registration: UP-35

Sonbarsa is a village in Salon block of Rae Bareli district, Uttar Pradesh, India. It is located 36 km from Raebareli, the district headquarters. As of 2011, Sonbarsa has a population of 1,041 people, in 181 households. It has one primary school and no healthcare facilities.

The 1961 census recorded Sonbarsa as comprising 3 hamlets, with a total population of 406 people (208 male and 198 female), in 125 households and 121 physical houses. The area of the village was given as 305 acres.

The 1981 census recorded Sonbarsa (as "Sunbarsa") as having a population of 505 people, in 155 households, and having an area of 119.38 hectares. The main staple foods were given as wheat and rice.
