= Bihibare =

Bihibare विहिवारे
- Village development committee
- Location in Nepal
- Coordinates: 26.626145°N 87.517833°E
- Country: Nepal
- Province: Province No. 1
- District: Morang District
- Gaunpalika: Kanepokhari

Population (1991)
  - Total: 10,802
- Time zone: UTC+5:45 (Nepal Time)

Bihibare (Nepali: विहिवारे) is a village in the Kanepokhari Rural Municipality in the Morang District of Province No. 1, south-eastern Nepal. It is the center of Kanepokhari Ward 6, which had a population of 5,771 in 2011.

== Location ==
Bihibare is in Nepal, Province 1, Morang, Kanepokhari. It is to the east of Bargachhi and northeast of Ramailo. The village was previously in Bayarban Ward 8. It is at an elevation of about 119 metres (390 ft) above sea level.

The Sukrabare-Bihibare-Bairawan Road is 10.74 kilometres (6.67 mi) long, of which 8.31 kilometres (5.16 mi) is graveled and the remainder is dirt. The Ramailo-Bihibare-Sibalaya is 8.77 kilometres (5.45 mi) long, of which 6.9 kilometres (4.3 mi) is graveled and the remained is dirt.

== Name ==
The Nepali word Bihibar means "Thursday". Bihibare is a common Eastern Nepal town name that indicates the day of the weekly haat bazaar. GeoNames lists 6 populated places in Nepal with this name.

== Population ==
In 2068 BS (2011 CE) Kanepokhari Ward 6 had 1,340 households with a total population of 5,771 of which 2,613 were male and 3,158 were female. The ward was previously Bayarban Ward 8.
