= Harakpur =

- Kanepokhari. Harakpur is in Ward 3
- Coordinates: 26.564428°N 87.512431°E
- Country: Nepal
- Province: Koshi
- District: Morang District
- Gaunpalika: Kanepokhari

Population (1991)
  - Total: 1,080
- Time zone: UTC+5:45 (Nepal Time)

Harakpur is a village in Ward 3 of the Kanepokhari Rural Municipality of the Morang District in Koshi Province of south-eastern Nepal.

== Location ==
The village has two parts: Mathillo Harakpur and Tallo Harakpur (Upper and Lower Harakpur). Both are in Nepal, Province 1, Morang, Kanepokhari. Mathillo Harakpur is at an elevation of about 95 metres (312 ft) above sea level. To the south, Tallo Harakpur is at about 88 metres (289 ft) above sea level. The Köppen climate classification is Cwa : Monsoon-influenced humid subtropical climate. The village is on the north-south Ramailo-Dohamana Road, and is to the east of Daleli and the southeast of Keroun. It is a farming community.

== Shiksha Sadan Secondary School ==
The Shiksha Sadan Secondary School is a public school located in Harakpur. The school was established in Tallo Harakpur in 1962. In 2014 it had 400 students. That year a project funded by the Eifion Trust of the United Kingdom began rebuilding the six-classroom building. The work was completed in five months, and replaced a decrepit structure with a concrete/brick building with old corrugated galvanised iron sheets used for the roof. As of 2014 the school had 24 higher secondary students. It was under the Panchayat Higher Secondary School Pathari.
