= Hoklabari =

Hoklabari होक्लाबारी
- Village development committee
- Kanepokhari in Morang District. Hoklabari VDC became Ward 1
- Coordinates: 26.55°N 87.47°E
- Country: Nepal
- Zone: Koshi Zone
- District: Morang District

Population (1991)
  - Total: 4,520
- Time zone: UTC+5:45 (Nepal Time)

Hoklabari (Nepali: होक्लावारी) was a village development committee in Morang District in the Koshi Zone of south-eastern Nepal. In 2017 it was absorbed by the newly created Kanepokhari Rural Municipality.

== Location ==
Hoklabari was in Nepal, Eastern Region, Kosī Zone, Morang. Its elevation is about 90 metres (300 ft) above sea level. The Köppen climate classification is Cwa : Monsoon-influenced humid subtropical climate.

== Population ==
Majority ethnic groups are Chettri and Brahmins alongside Santal and others. This village is famous for production of mustard and is also a major cultivator of rice and wheat.

At the time of the 1991 Nepal census it had a population of 4,520 people living in 806 individual households. The table below shows the populations in 2011 of the wards of Kanepokhari Rural Municipality. Hoklabari became Ward 1 when Kanepokhari was constituted in March 2017.

Ward	Ward Kendra	Households	2011 Population	Male	Female	Formed from
1	VDC Building Bayarban	1121	4830	2281	2549	Hoklabari all wards
2	VDC Building	1368	5941	2758	3183	Keroun Wards 3, 4, 6–9
3	Jayanepal Chowk	1174	5232	2449	2783	Bayarban Wards 1–5
4	Bayarban Bajar	1174	5242	2363	2879	Bayarban Wards 6, 7
5	Bhousabari	1558	6776	3107	3669	Keroun Wards 1, 2, 5
6	VDC Building	1340	5771	2613	3158	Bayarban Ward 8
7	Aitabare Bajar	948	4241	1916	2325	Bayarban Ward 9
