= Piparpur =

Piparpur may refer to:

== Places ==
- Piparpur, Bhadar, a village in Amethi district of Uttar Pradesh, India
  - Piparpur railway station
- Piparpur, Bhetua, a village in Amethi district of Uttar Pradesh, India
