= Gairikpur =

Village in Uttar Pradesh, India

- Village
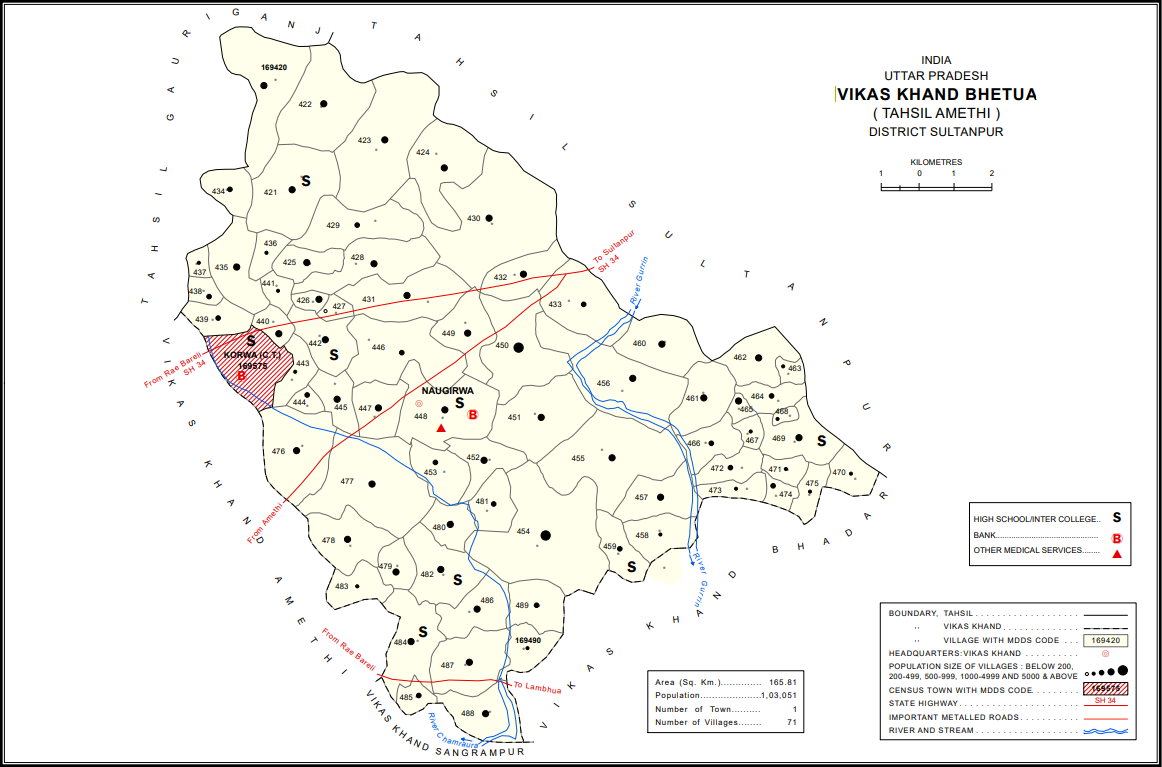
- Map showing Gairikpur (#469) in Bhetua CD block

- Location in Uttar Pradesh, India
- Coordinates: 26.189546°N 81.968719°E
- Country: India
- State: Uttar Pradesh
- Division: Faizabad division
- District: Amethi

Area
  - Total: 2.724 km^{2} (1.052 sq mi)

Population (2011)
  - Total: 1,754
  - Density: 643.9/km^{2} (1,668/sq mi)

Languages
  - Official: Hindi, Urdu
- Time zone: UTC+5:30 (IST)

Gairikpur is a village in Bhetua block of Amethi district in Uttar Pradesh, India. As of 2011, its population is 1,754 people, in 275 households. It has one primary school and no healthcare facilities and does not host a permanent market or weekly haat. It serves as the headquarters of a nyaya panchayat that also includes 15 other villages.

== Administration ==
- District: Amethi district (formerly part of Sultanpur district)
- Tehsil: Amethi
- Block: Bhetua
- Pargana: Ashal
- Thana: Piparpur
- Post office: Kalyanpur (postal code 228159)

== Infrastructure ==
The village has three temples:

- Shri Rishiveer Baba Devsthan
- Shri Kotebeer Baba Devsthan
- Shri Neem Bhawani Maata Devsthan

It has four schools:

- Primary Pathshala Gairikpur
- Swami Dashrath Maharaj Girl Inter College Gairikpur
- Junior high school balchandrapur

== Demographics ==
As of 2011, Gairikpur has a population of 1,754 people, in 275 households. The main occupations in the village are agriculture and fisheries.

The 1951 census recorded Gairikpur as comprising 7 hamlets, with a total population of 652 people (328 male and 324 female), in 130 households and 127 physical houses. The area of the village was given as 691 acres. 16 residents were literate, 15 male and 1 female. The village was listed as belonging to the pargana of Asal and the thana of Piparpur.

The 1961 census recorded Gairikpur as comprising 9 hamlets, with a total population of 754 people (363 male and 391 female), in 150 households and 144 physical houses. The area of the village was given as 692 acres.

The 1981 census recorded Gairikpur as having a population of 1,020 people, in 185 households, and having an area of 270.34 hectares. The main staple foods were listed as wheat and rice.

The 1991 census recorded Gairikpur (as "Gairik Pur") as having a total population of 1,272 people (617 male and 655 female), in 201 households and 200 physical houses. The area of the village was listed as 271.00 hectares. Members of the 0-6 age group numbered 268, or 21% of the total; this group was 50% male (135) and 50% female (133). Members of scheduled castes numbered 438, or 34% of the village's total population, while no members of scheduled tribes were recorded. The literacy rate of the village was 43% (345 men and 89 women, counting only people age 7 and up). 296 people were classified as main workers (277 men and 19 women), while 3 people were classified as marginal workers (all women); the remaining 973 residents were non-workers. The breakdown of main workers by employment category was as follows: 189 cultivators (i.e. people who owned or leased their own land); 47 agricultural labourers (i.e. people who worked someone else's land in return for payment); 2 workers in livestock, forestry, fishing, hunting, plantations, orchards, etc.; 0 in mining and quarrying; 2 household industry workers; 3 workers employed in other manufacturing, processing, service, and repair roles; 4 construction workers; 2 employed in trade and commerce; 1 employed in transport, storage, and communications; and 46 in other services.
