= Kanepokhari (pond) =

Pond in Nepal

- कानेपोखरी (Nepali)}
- Location within Nepal
- Interactive map of Kanepokhari
- Location: Kanepokhari, Morang District, Province No. 1, Nepal
- Coordinates: 26°39′03″N 87°29′51″E
- Basin countries: Nepal
- Built: Mahabharata period

Kanepokhari (Nepali: कानेपोखरी) is a pond (Nepali: पोखरी : Pōkharī) that gives its name to the Kanepokhari Rural Municipality in Morang District, Province No. 1, Nepal.

== Location ==
The pond is about 23 kilometres (14 mi) east of Itahari and 20 kilometres (12 mi) west of Damak. Google Maps shows Kanepokhari in the forest area to the east of the section of the Kanepokhari–Rangeli Road that runs south from Kanepokhari village to Aitabare village. The pond is north of the Aitabare-Sukrabare Road, which defines the southern boundary of the forest area. In the past the pond was home to rare fishes, turtles and snakes, and the waters were used by migratory birds and forest deer.

== Name ==
There are different stories about the origins of the pond's name. One is that an old woman who lived near the pond sold ear ornaments to the Dhimal people to wear during festivals, and the name comes from Kane Gahana, meaning "ear ornaments". Another is that people used to eat near the pond during festivals, and the name comes from Khajapokhari (food pond), which evolved into Kanepokhari. A third story is that in the Mahabharata period King Virata ordered a cattle herder named Kane to dig the pond to provide water to his cows, and the pond is named after the herder.

== Shrinkage ==
In 2012 it was reported that lakes in Eastern Nepal were drying up, and some could disappear completely, due to a combination of climate change, deforestation, human activities and encroachment. Kane Pokhari was among the ponds that had been saved from the brink of disappearance due to local initiatives. In May 2019 it was reported that the lake had shrunk from five Bighas in area to just one Bigha. (Note: A Bigha in Nepal is about 6,773 square metres (72,900 sq ft).) The local government allocated Rs. 1 million in 2018 to conserve the pond, but due to lack of an action plan the money was unspent. The President Chure Conservation Committee had allocated Rs. 1.5 million to conserve the pond, but internal problems in the committee meant that money was also unspent.

== Tourism potential ==
In June 2018 it was reported that the community forest users committee of the Kanepokhari rural municipality was building structures around the Kanepokhari pond and the Bhuluwa wetland area to develop it into a tourist site.
