= Inchhan Gonda =

- Village
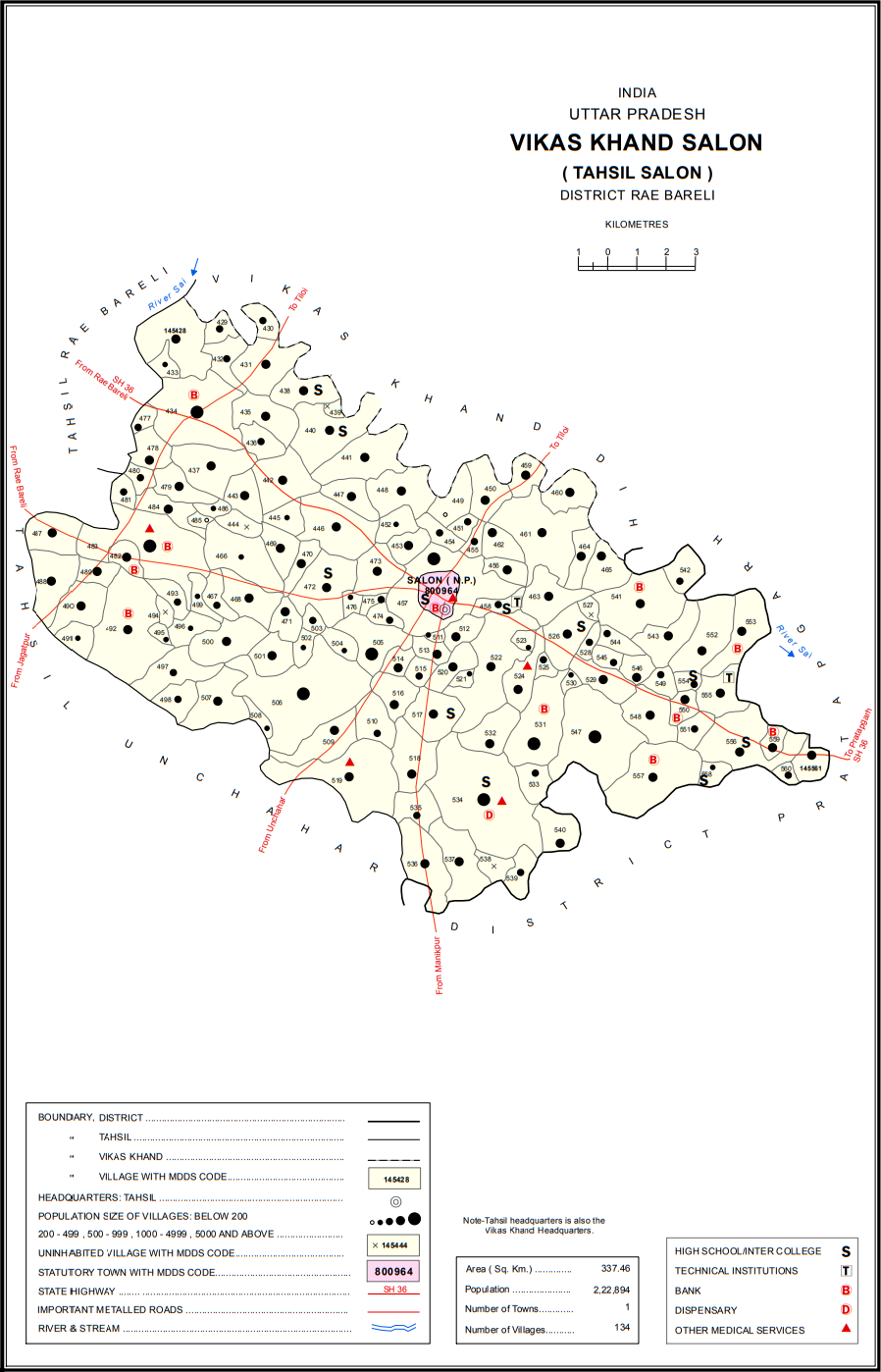
- Map showing Inchhan Gonda (#542) in Salon CD block

- Location in Uttar Pradesh, India
- Coordinates: 26.030341°N 81.538545°E
- Country: India
- State: Uttar Pradesh
- District: Raebareli

Area
  - Total: 0.886 km^{2} (0.342 sq mi)

Population (2011)
  - Total: 938
  - Density: 1,060/km^{2} (2,740/sq mi)

Languages
  - Official: Hindi
- Time zone: UTC+5:30 (IST)
- Vehicle registration: UP-35

Inchhan Gonda is a village in Salon block of Rae Bareli district, Uttar Pradesh, India. It is located 8 km from Salon, the block and tehsil headquarters. As of 2011, Inchhan Gonda has a population of 938 people, in 193 households. It has one primary school and no healthcare facilities, and it does not host a permanent market or a periodic haat.

The 1961 census recorded Inchhan Gonda as comprising 5 hamlets, with a total population of 521 people (265 male and 256 female), in 95 households and 94 physical houses. The area of the village was given as 396 acres.

The 1981 census recorded Inchhan Gonda (as "Ichhan Goda") as having a population of 713 people, in 163 households, and having an area of 160.26 hectares. The main staple foods were given as wheat and rice.
