= Janasewa Secondary School =

Coordinates: 26°36′57″N 87°30′1″E

shree Jansewa Higher Secondary School Ramailo
- श्री जनसेवा माध्यमिक विद्यालय
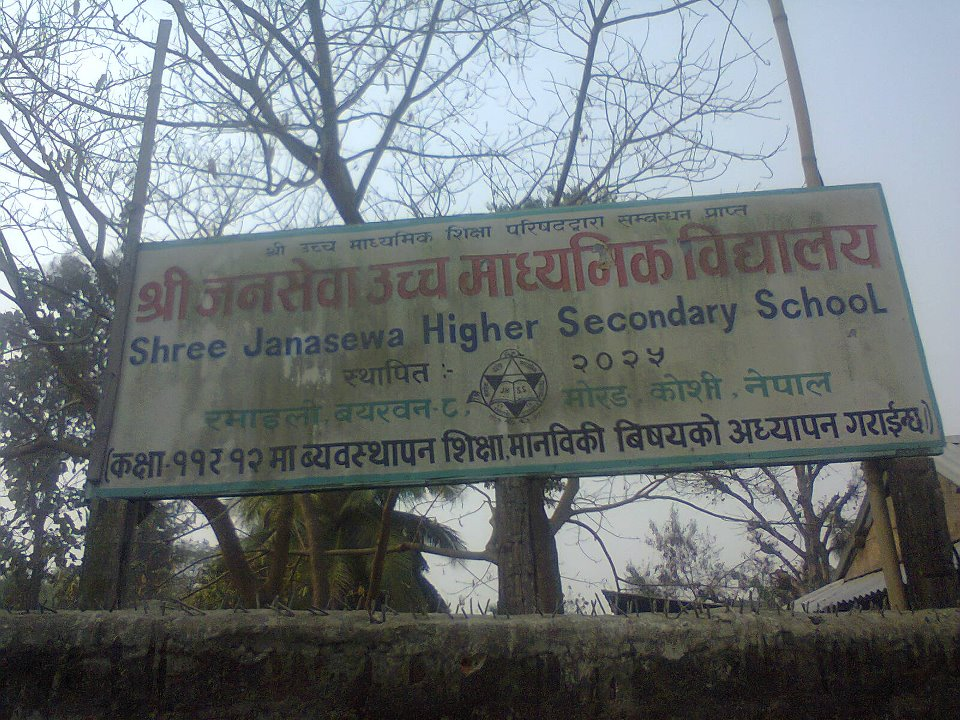

Location
- Ramailo; Kanepokhari Rural Municipality-6, Morang District, koshi province Nepal

Information
- Type: Public, Independent school, Coeducational
- Motto: Centre of Excellence
- Established: 1968(2025 B.S.)
- School district: Morang
- Headmaster: pramod Niroula
- Staff: 35
- Enrollment: 1600
- Nickname: JSS
- Affiliations: School Leaving Certificate (Grade 10); Higher Secondary Education Board (10+2)

Janasewa Secondary School (or Jana Sewa School; Nepali: जनसेवा माध्यमिक विद्यालय) is a school located in Ramailo, Kanepokhari-6, Morang District, Nepal.

== Students ==
According to the school's website, as of 2020 it had about 35 staff members and was the home or center of excellence to 1,600 students. According to the Morang Education Development And Coordination Unit, the number of higher secondary students at the school is between 53 and 178.

== Program ==
The school is affiliated with National Examination Board. It offers "Ten Plus Two" courses in Education and Management.

== Alumni ==
- Jamuna Gurung (footballer), captain of the Nepal women's national football team in 2012, was born and raised in Ramailo. She learned to play soccer at the Jana Sewa School.
