= Bhadar =

Bhadar Bhādar
- Village
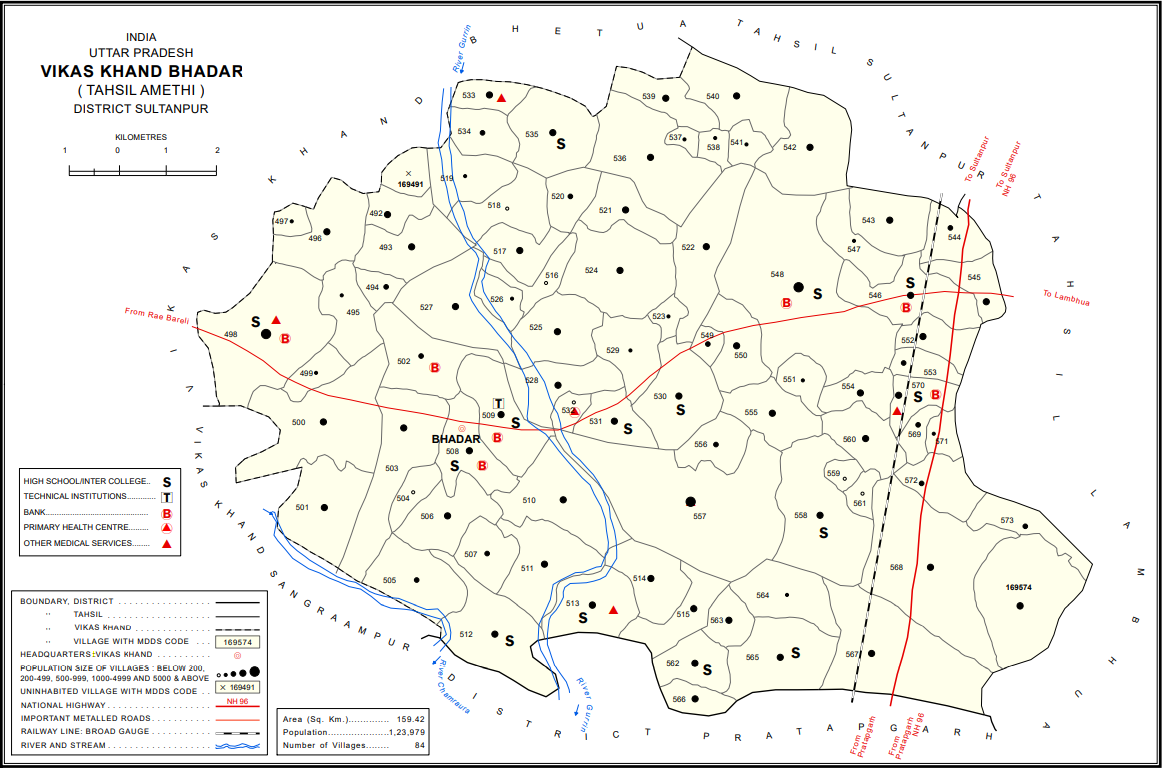
- Map showing Bhadar (#508) in Bhadar CD block

- Location in Uttar Pradesh, India
- Coordinates: 26.110535°N 81.944004°E
- Country: India
- State: Uttar Pradesh
- Division: Faizabad division
- District: Amethi

Area
  - Total: 1.531 km^{2} (0.591 sq mi)

Population (2011)
  - Total: 2,896
  - Density: 1,892/km^{2} (4,899/sq mi)

Languages
  - Official: Hindi, Urdu
- Time zone: UTC+5:30 (IST)

Bhadar is a village and community development block headquarters in Amethi tehsil of Amethi district, Uttar Pradesh, India. As of 2011, it has a population of 2,896 people, in 465 households. It has one primary school and a veterinary hospital and it hosts a weekly haat but not a permanent market. It serves as the headquarters of a nyaya panchayat that also includes 13 other villages.

The 1951 census recorded Bhadar as comprising 2 hamlets, with a total population of 1,411 people (712 male and 699 female), in 288 households and 269 physical houses. The area of the village was given as 398 acres. 136 residents were literate, all male. The village was listed as belonging to the pargana of Asal and the thana of Piparpur. The village had a district board-run primary school with 150 students in attendance as of 1 January 1951.

The 1961 census recorded Bhadar as comprising 2 hamlets, with a total population of 1,583 people (787 male and 796 female), in 318 households and 288 physical houses. The area of the village was given as 398 acres and it had a post office and maternity and child welfare centre at that point.

The 1981 census recorded Bhadar as having a population of 2,156 people, in 401 households, and having an area of 153.79 hectares. The main staple foods were listed as wheat and rice.

The 1991 census recorded Bhadar as having a total population of 2,418 people (1,209 male and 1,209 female), in 407 households and 395 physical houses. The area of the village was listed as 154.00 hectares. Members of the 0-6 age group numbered 429, or 18% of the total; this group was 53% male (227) and 47% female (202). Members of scheduled castes numbered 475, or 20% of the village's total population, while no members of scheduled tribes were recorded. The literacy rate of the village was 54% (662 men and 414 women, counting only people age 7 and up). 664 people were classified as main workers (513 men and 151 women), while 101 people were classified as marginal workers (1 man and 100 women); the remaining 1,653 residents were non-workers. The breakdown of main workers by employment category was as follows: 295 cultivators (i.e. people who owned or leased their own land); 183 agricultural labourers (i.e. people who worked someone else's land in return for payment); 30 workers in livestock, forestry, fishing, hunting, plantations, orchards, etc.; 0 in mining and quarrying; 23 household industry workers; 33 workers employed in other manufacturing, processing, service, and repair roles; 0 construction workers; 18 employed in trade and commerce; 1 employed in transport, storage, and communications; and 81 in other services.

== Villages ==
Bhadar CD block has the following 84 villages:

Village name	Total land area (hectares)	Population (in 2011)
Pitambarpur	23	0
Kastoori Pur	152.4	1,473
Sawangee	274.7	1,481
Saraiyya	49.6	641
Khaun Pur Gurudatt Garh	159.6	274
Balipur Hudiya	244.3	1,058
Pitambar Pur	16.4	385
Teekarma Phi	556.8	6,407
Baulhaa	74.4	256
Sonaari Kalan	464.2	3,665
Amtahi	452.4	2,267
Keshav Pur	248.5	917
Ghorha	292.6	3,462
Paschim Pur	83	166
Gokula	179.7	646
Bhava Pur	164.9	1,122
Gara Pur	118.6	657
Bhadar (block headquarters)	153.1	2,896
Gaji Pur	284	1,414
Rata Pur	414	3,425
Narhar Pur	187.9	1,888
Parsoyia	266.8	1,461
Mangra	234.7	2,316
Mavaiya	169.4	1,582
Bahadur Pur	159	1,456
Gopalapur	12.2	110
Ismail Pur	286.1	1,951
Karnai Pur	25.3	144
Ray Pur	109.3	267
Khajha	93.5	847
Rewra	123.5	1,160
Bhojpur	290.5	1,421
Malepur	45.9	298
Bhewyi	333.6	2,601
Kharg Pur	160.6	2,187
Nonkhar	88.3	285
Neudhya	317.4	2,267
Ngardeeh	307.9	2,681
Manda	20.6	285
Guduri	267.5	2,858
Sigthee	122.5	1,082
Roopi Pur	26.7	117
Baidhik Pur	106.2	1,172
Rawani Pur	109.6	647
Kalyanpur	222.3	1,808
Bhadaw	368.8	2,245
Rawatpur	24.1	236
Maheshi Pur	54.6	396
Dasaipur	96	1,413
Mochwa	226	2,192
Khoodipur	51.3	309
Lahna	295	1,974
Khanapur	162.3	1,319
Beeka Pur	86.6	583
Durga Pur	101.5	1,653
Narbahan Pur	299.6	2,125
Tilak Chhuwa	45.4	407
Piper Pur	970	6,825
Beeghapur	41.6	505
Dahiyawa	87	1,207
Marui	91.9	331
Kurang	103.6	1,131
Rampur	40.4	848
Khargipur	81.8	1,035
Sangapur	147.1	1,771
Tiwaripur	111.3	691
Sonari	743.1	5,052
Agresar	388	2,831
Pathkhauli	22.8	132
Ramchandra Pur	138.7	1,317
Songarha	24.8	164
Trilok Pur	142.5	1,423
Demaa	94.7	1,113
Bhaisaha	164.9	419
Alampur	240.3	1,620
Vasdevpur	74.2	1,443
Chauda	507.6	1,683
Trishundi	621	4,047
Vishundas Pur	50.9	722
Raypur	107.6	3,552
Gani Pur	34.8	469
Sansari Pur	115	968
Dulhin Pur	126.3	917
Bhagi Pur	366.1	1,408
Block total	15,942.7	123,979
Village name	Total land area (hectares)	Population (in 2011)
