= Pindoriya =

- Village
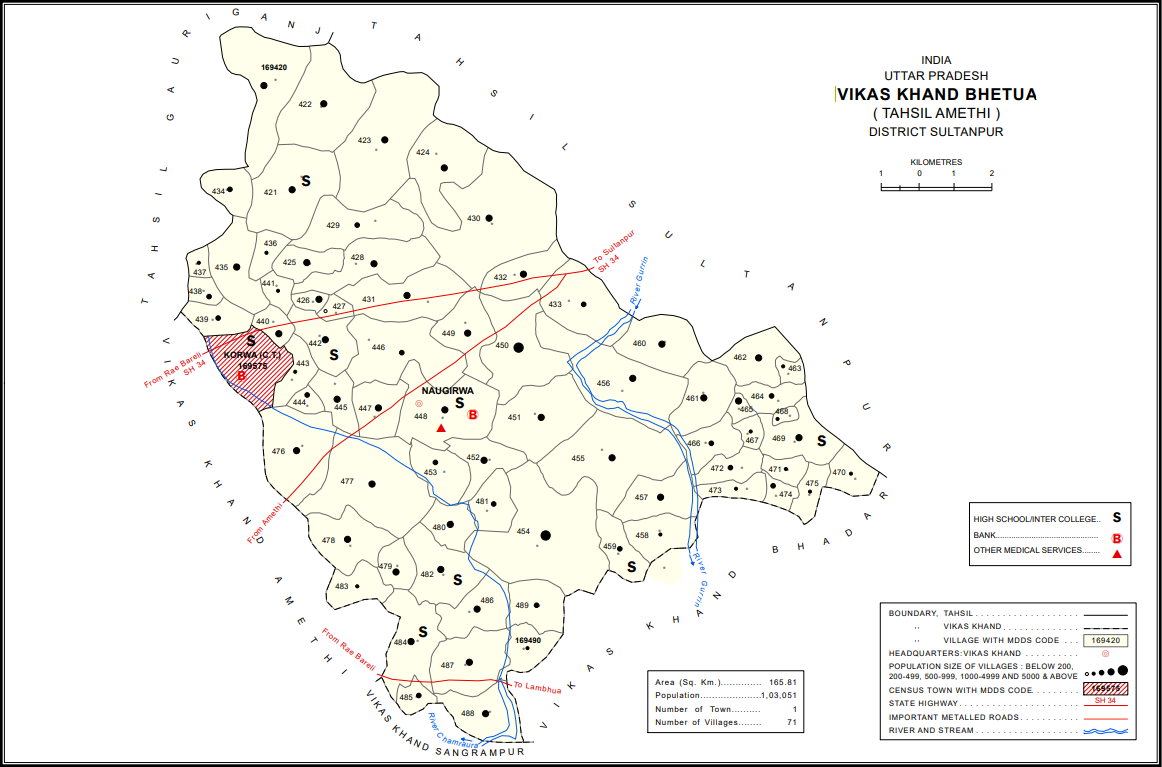
- Map showing Pindoriya (#477) in Bhetua CD block

- Location in Uttar Pradesh, India
- Coordinates: 26.181228°N 81.848193°E
- Country: India
- State: Uttar Pradesh
- Division: Ayodhya
- District: Amethi

Area
  - Total: 6.571 km^{2} (2.537 sq mi)

Population (2011)
  - Total: 3,744
  - Density: 569.8/km^{2} (1,476/sq mi)

Languages
  - Official: Hindi, Urdu
- Time zone: UTC+5:30 (IST)

Pindoriya is a village in Bhetua block of Amethi district, Uttar Pradesh, India. As of 2011, it has a population of 3,744 people, in 649 households. It has one primary school and no healthcare facilities and does not host a weekly haat or permanent market. It belongs to the nyaya panchayat of Bhetua.

The 1951 census recorded Pindoriya (as "Pendoriya") as comprising 15 hamlets, with a total population of 1,535 people (770 male and 765 female), in 346 households and 325 physical houses. The area of the village was given as 1,680 acres. 82 residents were literate, all male. The village was listed as belonging to the pargana of Amethi and the thana of Raipur. The village had a district board-run primary school with 115 students in attendance as of 1 January 1951.

The 1961 census recorded Pindoriya (as "Pendoriy") as comprising 16 hamlets, with a total population of 1,578 people (770 male and 808 female), in 324 households and 298 physical houses. The area of the village was given as 1,680 acres and it had a post office at that point.

The 1981 census recorded Pindoriya as having a population of 2,110 people, in 375 households, and having an area of 659.25 hectares. The main staple foods were listed as wheat and rice.

The 1991 census recorded Pindoriya as having a total population of 2,533 people (1,254 male and 1,279 female), in 415 households and 410 physical houses. The area of the village was listed as 659.00 hectares. Members of the 0-6 age group numbered 429, or 17% of the total; this group was 50% male (216) and 50% female (213). Members of scheduled castes numbered 455, or 18% of the village's total population, while no members of scheduled tribes were recorded. The literacy rate of the village was 46.5% (710 men and 269 women, counting only people age 7 and up). 791 people were classified as main workers (635 men and 156 women), while 25 people were classified as marginal workers (all women); the remaining 1,717 residents were non-workers. The breakdown of main workers by employment category was as follows: 404 cultivators (i.e. people who owned or leased their own land); 226 agricultural labourers (i.e. people who worked someone else's land in return for payment); 1 worker in livestock, forestry, fishing, hunting, plantations, orchards, etc.; 0 in mining and quarrying; 50 household industry workers; 26 workers employed in other manufacturing, processing, service, and repair roles; 2 construction workers; 11 employed in trade and commerce; 1 employed in transport, storage, and communications; and 70 in other services.
