= Bhetua =

- Village
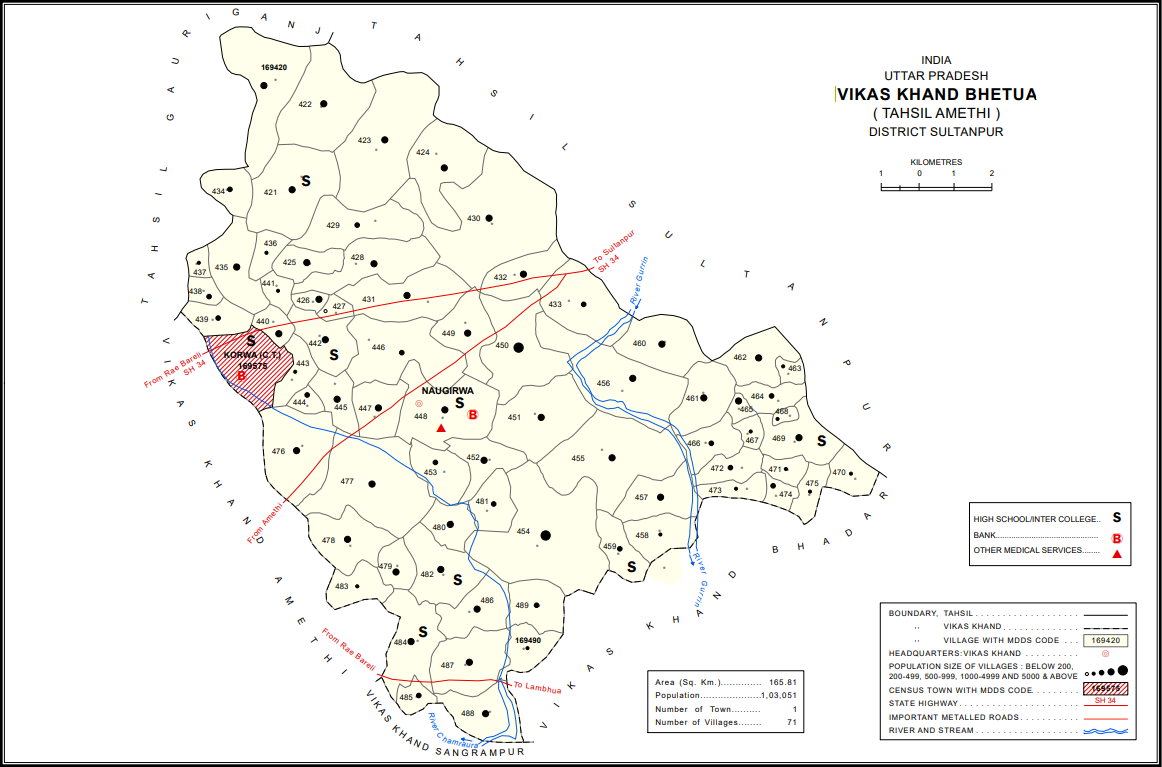
- Map showing Bhetua (#060) in Bhetua CD block

- Location in Uttar Pradesh, India
- Coordinates: 26.165668°N 81.876862°E
- Country: India
- State: Uttar Pradesh
- Division: Faizabad division
- District: Amethi

Area
  - Total: 2.881 km^{2} (1.112 sq mi)

Population (2011)
  - Total: 1,680
  - Density: 583/km^{2} (1,510/sq mi)

Languages
  - Official: Hindi, Urdu
- Time zone: UTC+5:30 (IST)

Bhetua is a village in Amethi tehsil of Amethi district, Uttar Pradesh, India. As of 2011, it has a population of 1,680 people, in 260 households. It has one primary school and no healthcare facilities and does not host a weekly haat or permanent market. Bhetua serves as the headquarters of a community development block, which includes 71 rural villages as well as the census town of Korwa. It also serves as the headquarters of a nyaya panchayat that also includes 14 other villages.

The 1951 census recorded Bhetua (as "Bhetwa Mafi") as comprising 20 hamlets, with a total population of 1,148 people (559 male and 589 female), in 248 households and 238 physical houses. The area of the village was given as 747 acres. 100 residents were literate, all male. The village was listed as belonging to the pargana of Amethi and the thana of Raipur.

The 1961 census recorded Bhetua (as "Bhetuwa Muafi") as comprising 14 hamlets, with a total population of 1,231 people (571 male and 660 female), in 252 households and 243 physical houses. The area of the village was given as 747 acres.

The 1981 census recorded Bhetua (as "Bhetuwa") as having a population of 1,747 people, in 338 households, and having an area of 307.57 hectares. The main staple foods were listed as wheat and rice.

The 1991 census recorded Bhetua (as "Bhetuwa") as having a total population of 2,067 people (1,052 male and 1,015 female), in 380 households and 375 physical houses. The area of the village was listed as 208.00 hectares. Members of the 0-6 age group numbered 372, or 18% of the total; this group was 49% male (183) and 51% female (189). Members of scheduled castes numbered 399, or 19% of the village's total population, while no members of scheduled tribes were recorded. The literacy rate of the village was 48% (629 men and 186 women, counting only people age 7 and up). 644 people were classified as main workers (491 men and 153 women), while 59 people were classified as marginal workers (all women); the remaining 1,364 residents were non-workers. The breakdown of main workers by employment category was as follows: 297 cultivators (i.e. people who owned or leased their own land); 239 agricultural labourers (i.e. people who worked someone else's land in return for payment); 0 workers in livestock, forestry, fishing, hunting, plantations, orchards, etc.; 0 in mining and quarrying; 23 household industry workers; 9 workers employed in other manufacturing, processing, service, and repair roles; 1 construction worker; 28 employed in trade and commerce; 0 employed in transport, storage, and communications; and 47 in other services.

== Villages ==
Bhetua CD block has the following 71 villages:

Village name	Total land area (hectares)	Population (in 2011)
Kanak Singh Pur	425.3	1,524
Korari Lachchan Shah	398.5	1,717
Korari Heer Shah	509.1	1,676
Semra	592.3	2,357
Marerika	328.3	2,133
Sultanpur	135.9	1,339
Ghatampur	262.5	1,447
Bheera	26.1	116
Paschim Dwara	307.8	1,280
Dalshah Pur	146.9	887
Saruwanwa	804.2	4,547
Purab Dwara	138.9	1,280
Sanaha	208.8	1,251
Partosh Manik	302.8	973
Tulsi Pur	111.5	526
Bhu Siyanwa	249.8	1,901
Rangwaria	101.1	385
Koryani	71.8	483
Neoriya	70.7	777
Narsingh Bhanpur	96.6	786
Rajapur Kalyan	157.6	1,249
Dhanapur	68	293
Dharaimafi	131.8	1,445
Dalao	61.8	428
Sumerpur	71.9	652
Manirampur	161.7	1,390
Katra Rani	165.6	837
Bandoiya	445.6	1,242
Naugirwa	110.8	1,168
Peeparpur	258.1	1,025
Tikree	900.2	7,165
Ghorha	422	1,177
Shiv Garh Jalal Pur	161.1	1,557
Sandeela	154.4	605
Bhimi	826.1	5,086
Amey Maphi	614.4	3,593
Mayi	651.8	2,430
Sahri	228.8	1,308
Pure Kumar Shah	135	383
Saraiyya Mohan	133.1	708
Tikawar	312.8	1,566
Ghatkaur	223.9	1,190
Bashoo	166.9	1,529
Bas00 Pur	37.9	365
Khadhar	99.1	826
Heerapur	93.8	1,005
Mahnaa	112	547
Parshurampur	58.7	315
Madanpur	12.2	231
Gairik Pur	272.4	1,754
Kotwaa	117.8	397
Balchandra Pur	54.8	273
Haripur	72.7	977
Manga Gopalpur	58.5	436
Uskaa	87.7	739
Sakra Ramnagar	116.3	360
Thaura	418.3	2,403
Pindoriya	657.1	3,744
Kadergaon	241.2	1,215
Laukapur	99.7	1,107
Arsahni	145.5	1,438
Gangahuwa	142.1	976
Bhetuwa (block headquarters)	288.1	1,680
Alipur	135.9	439
Bhretha	326.8	3,032
Saraypan	66.4	576
Baisra	187.2	1,872
Gungwachh	361.2	2,137
Kamsin	199	1,349
Pathkhauli	159.1	506
Mathkanaegiri	107.2	417
Block total	16,581	96,527
Village name	Total land area (hectares)	Population (in 2011)
