= Naugirwa =

- Village
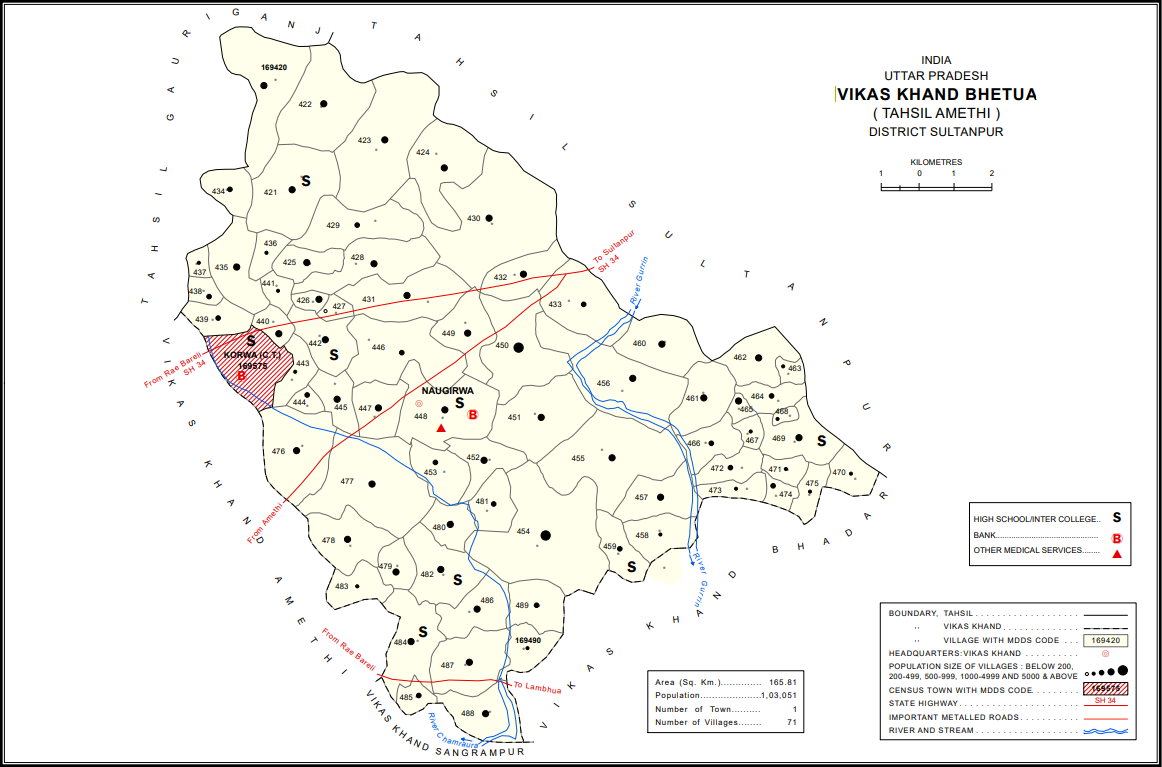
- Map showing Naugirwa (#448) in Bhetua CD block

- Location in Uttar Pradesh, India
- Coordinates: 26.210243°N 81.876708°E
- Country: India
- State: Uttar Pradesh
- Division: Faizabad division
- District: Amethi

Area
  - Total: 1.108 km^{2} (0.428 sq mi)

Population (2011)
  - Total: 1,168
  - Density: 1,054/km^{2} (2,730/sq mi)

Languages
  - Official: Hindi, Urdu
- Time zone: UTC+5:30 (IST)

Naugirwa is a village in the Bhetua block of Amethi district, Uttar Pradesh, India. As of 2011, it has a population of 1,168 people in 220 households. It has one primary school and a veterinary hospital and hosts a weekly haat but not a permanent market. It belongs to the nyaya panchayat of Darai Mafi.

The 1951 census recorded Naugirwa comprising 2 hamlets, with a total population of 303 people (143 male and 160 female), in 64 households and 59 physical houses. 15 residents were literate, all male. The village was listed as belonging to the pargana of Amethi and the thana of Raipur.

The 1961 census recorded Naugirwa as comprising 2 hamlets, with a total population of 334 people (154 male and 180 female), in 74 households and 68 physical houses. The village area was given as 306 acres.

The 1981 census recorded Naugirwa as having a population of 509 people, in 99 households, and having an area of 115.74 hectares. The main staple foods were listed as wheat and rice.

The 1991 census recorded Naugirwa as having a total population of 736 people (393 male and 343 female), in 120 households and 118 physical houses. The area of the village was listed as 116.00 hectares. Members of the 0-6 age group numbered 130, or 18% of the total; this group was 57% male (74) and 43% female (56). Members of scheduled castes numbered 101, or 14% of the village's total population, while no members of scheduled tribes were recorded. The literacy rate of the village was 33% (157 men and 44 women, counting only people aged 7 and up). 371 people were classified as main workers (206 men and 165 women), while 4 were classified as marginal workers (all women); the remaining 361 residents were non-workers. The breakdown of main workers by employment category was as follows: 305 cultivators (i.e. people who owned or leased their own land); 34 agricultural labourers (i.e. people who worked someone else's land in return for payment); 0 workers in livestock, forestry, fishing, hunting, plantations, orchards, etc.; 0 in mining and quarrying; 0 household industry workers; 1 worker employed in other manufacturing, processing, service, and repair roles; 0 construction workers; 0 employed in trade and commerce; 3 used in transport, storage, and communications; and 28 in other services.
