= Ghaletol =

Ghaletole
- Village development committee
- Nickname: Ghale gaue
- Location in Nepal
- Coordinates: 26.635200°N 87.492355°E
- Country: Nepal
- Province: Province No. 1
- District: Morang District
- Gauepalika: Kanepokhari
- Time zone: UTC+5:45 (Nepal Time)

Ghaletole is a village in the Kanepokhari Rural Municipality in the Morang District of Province No. 1, south-eastern Nepal.

== Location ==
Ghaletole is in Nepal, Province 1, Morang, Kanepokhari. The elevation is about 128 metres (420 ft) above sea level. The Köppen climate classification is Cwa: Monsoon-influenced humid subtropical climate.
