= Jairampur Pande =

Village in Rae Bareli (Uttar Pradesh), India

Jairampur Pande Jairāmpur Pānde
- Village
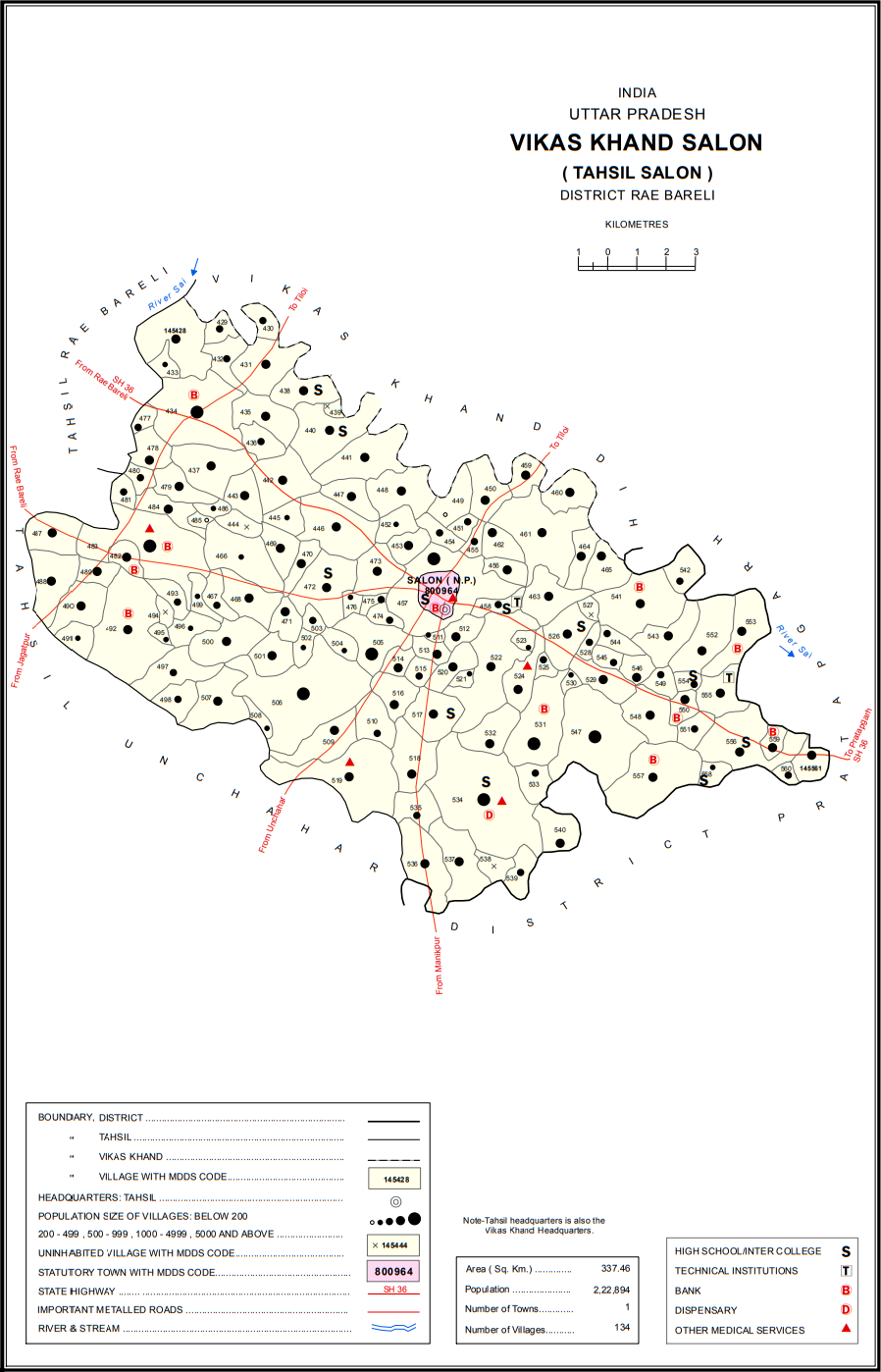
- Map showing Jairampur Pande (#551) in Salon CD block

- Location in Uttar Pradesh, India
- Coordinates: 25.986315°N 81.545619°E
- Country: India
- State: Uttar Pradesh
- District: Raebareli

Area
  - Total: 0.984 km^{2} (0.380 sq mi)

Population (2011)
  - Total: 770
  - Density: 780/km^{2} (2,000/sq mi)

Languages
  - Official: Hindi
- Time zone: UTC+5:30 (IST)
- Vehicle registration: UP-35

Jairampur Pande is a village in Salon block of Rae Bareli district, Uttar Pradesh, India. It is located 39 km from Raebareli, the district headquarters. As of 2011, Jairampur Pande has a population of 770 people, in 109 households. It has no schools and no healthcare facilities, and it does not host a permanent market or a periodic haat.

The 1961 census recorded Jairampur Pande as comprising 1 hamlet, with a total population of 233 people (121 male and 112 female), in 49 households and 49 physical houses. The area of the village was given as 252 acres.

The 1981 census recorded Jairampur Pande (as "Jairampur Panday") as having a population of 625 people, in 76 households, and having an area of 99.96 hectares. The main staple foods were given as wheat and rice.
