= Arsahni =

- Village
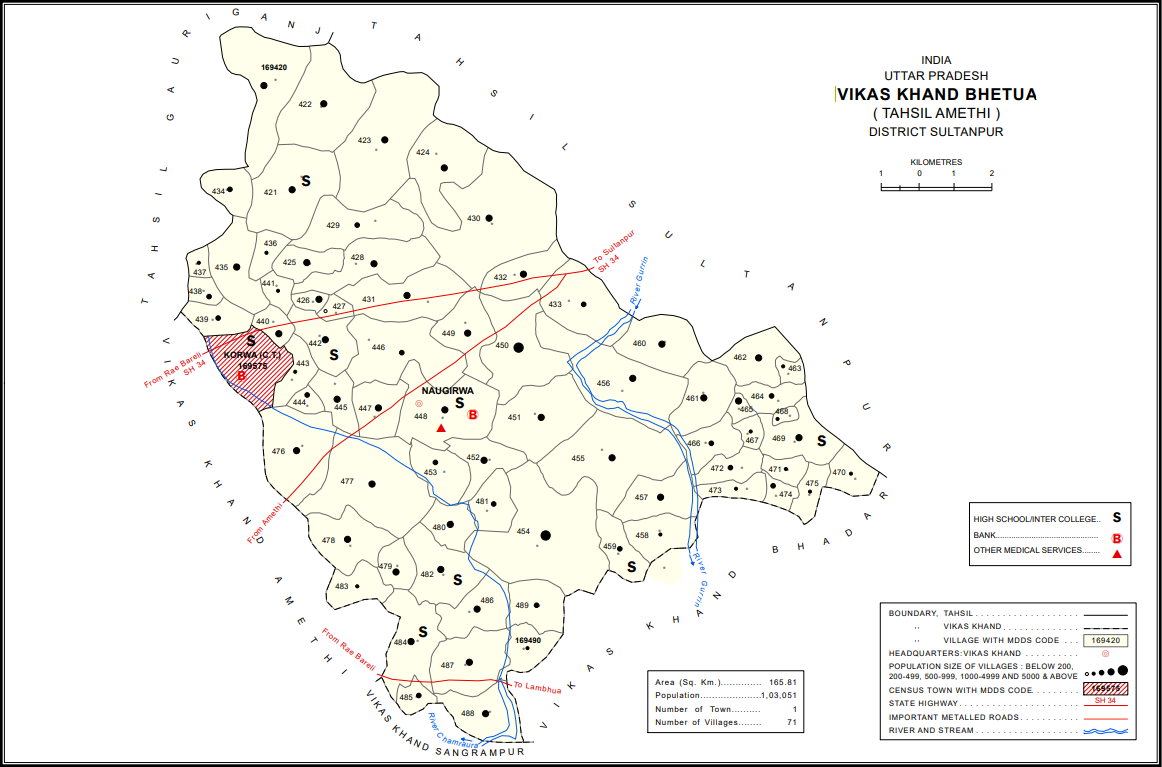
- Map showing Arsahni (#480) in Bhetua CD block

- Location in Uttar Pradesh, India
- Coordinates: 26.171002°N 81.878209°E
- Country: India
- State: Uttar Pradesh
- Division: Ayodhya
- District: Amethi

Area
  - Total: 1.455 km^{2} (0.562 sq mi)

Population (2011)
  - Total: 1,438
  - Density: 988.3/km^{2} (2,560/sq mi)

Languages
  - Official: Hindi, Urdu
- Time zone: UTC+5:30 (IST)

Arsahni is a village in Bhetua block of Amethi district, Uttar Pradesh, India. As of 2011, it has a population of 1,438 people, in 213 households. It has one primary school and no healthcare facilities and does not host a weekly haat or permanent market. It belongs to the nyaya panchayat of Bhetua.

The 1951 census recorded Arsahni as comprising 3 hamlets, with a total population of 305 people (156 male and 149 female), in 63 households and 58 physical houses. The area of the village was given as 367 acres. 19 residents were literate, all male. The village was listed as belonging to the pargana of Amethi and the thana of Raipur.

The 1961 census recorded Arsahni as comprising 3 hamlets, with a total population of 319 people (171 male and 148 female), in 65 households and 51 physical houses. The area of the village was given as 367 acres.

The 1981 census recorded Arsahni as having a population of 435 people, in 75 households, and having an area of 154.19 hectares. The main staple foods were listed as wheat and rice.

The 1991 census recorded Arsahni as having a total population of 631 people (324 male and 307 female), in 96 households and 96 physical houses. The area of the village was listed as 145.00 hectares. Members of the 0-6 age group numbered 103, or 16% of the total; this group was 48% male (49) and 52% female (54). Members of scheduled castes numbered 109, or 17% of the village's total population, while no members of scheduled tribes were recorded. The literacy rate of the village was 49% (191 men and 68 women, counting only people age 7 and up). 108 people were classified as main workers (105 men and 3 women), while 0 people were classified as marginal workers; the remaining 523 residents were non-workers. The breakdown of main workers by employment category was as follows: 88 cultivators (i.e. people who owned or leased their own land); 8 agricultural labourers (i.e. people who worked someone else's land in return for payment); 0 workers in livestock, forestry, fishing, hunting, plantations, orchards, etc.; 0 in mining and quarrying; 0 household industry workers; 0 workers employed in other manufacturing, processing, service, and repair roles; 0 construction workers; 1 employed in trade and commerce; 2 employed in transport, storage, and communications; and 9 in other services.
