= Thaura =

- Village
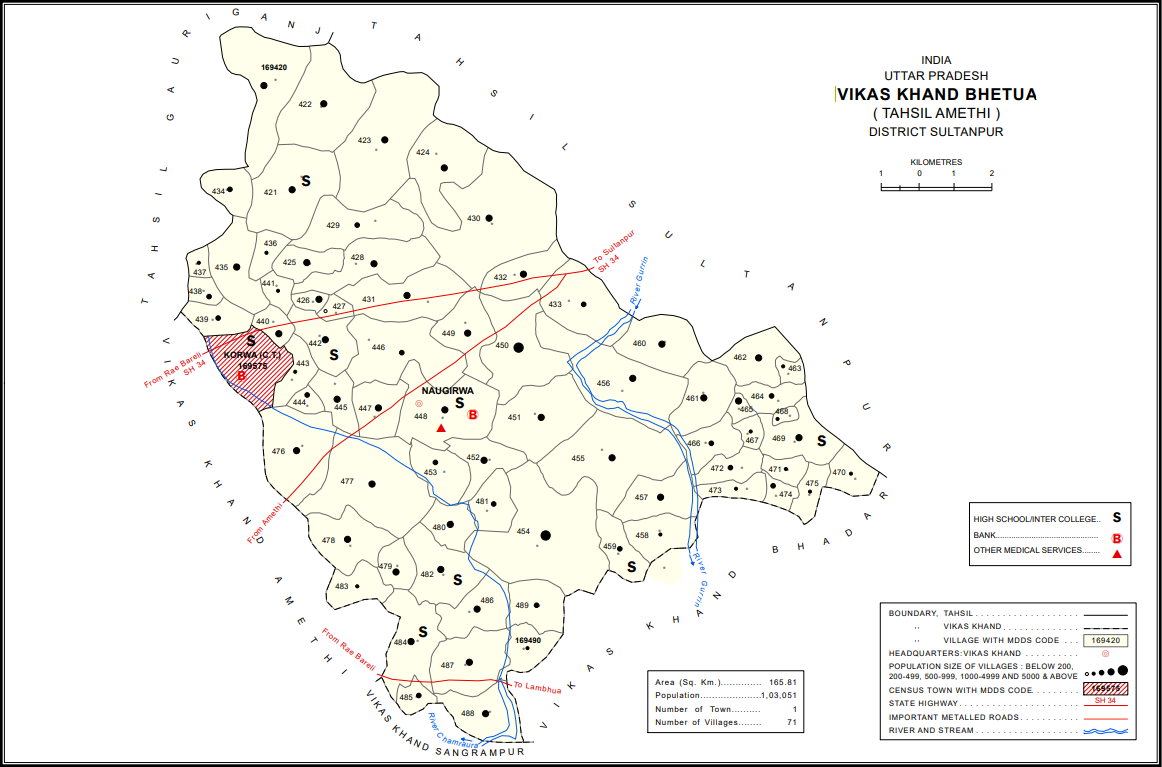
- Map showing Thaura (#476) in Bhetua CD block

- Location in Uttar Pradesh, India
- Coordinates: 26.186351°N 81.839797°E
- Country: India
- State: Uttar Pradesh
- Division: Faizabad division
- District: Amethi

Area
  - Total: 4.183 km^{2} (1.615 sq mi)

Population (2011)
  - Total: 2,403
  - Density: 574.5/km^{2} (1,488/sq mi)

Languages
  - Official: Hindi, Urdu
- Time zone: UTC+5:30 (IST)

Thaura is a village in Bhetua block of Amethi district, Uttar Pradesh, India. As of 2011, it has a population of 2,403 people, in 382 households. It has one primary school and no healthcare facilities and hosts a weekly haat but not a permanent market. It belongs to the nyaya panchayat of Bhetua.

The 1951 census recorded Thaura as comprising 3 hamlets, with a total population of 956 people (469 male and 487 female), in 192 households and 182 physical houses. The area of the village was given as 1,073 acres. 117 residents were literate, 109 male and 8 female. The village was listed as belonging to the pargana of Amethi and the thana of Raipur. The village had a district board-run primary school with 77 students in attendance as of 1 January 1951.

The 1961 census recorded Thaura as comprising 6 hamlets, with a total population of 961 people (474 male and 487 female), in 200 households and 195 physical houses. The area of the village was given as 1,073 acres.

The 1981 census recorded Thaura as having a population of 1,327 people, in 259 households, and having an area of 428.98 hectares. The main staple foods were listed as wheat and rice.

The 1991 census recorded Thaura as having a total population of 1,653 people (850 male and 803 female), in 281 households and 278 physical houses. The area of the village was listed as 429.00 hectares. Members of the 0-6 age group numbered 336, or 20% of the total; this group was 51% male (171) and 49% female (165). Members of scheduled castes numbered 449, or 27% of the village's total population, while no members of scheduled tribes were recorded. The literacy rate of the village was 40.5% (389 men and 145 women, counting only people age 7 and up). 525 people were classified as main workers (480 men and 45 women), while 0 people were classified as marginal workers; the remaining 1,128 residents were non-workers. The breakdown of main workers by employment category was as follows: 342 cultivators (i.e. people who owned or leased their own land); 93 agricultural labourers (i.e. people who worked someone else's land in return for payment); 0 workers in livestock, forestry, fishing, hunting, plantations, orchards, etc.; 0 in mining and quarrying; 19 household industry workers; 4 workers employed in other manufacturing, processing, service, and repair roles; 0 construction workers; 6 employed in trade and commerce; 4 employed in transport, storage, and communications; and 57 in other services.
