= Tikri, Amethi =

Tikri
- Village
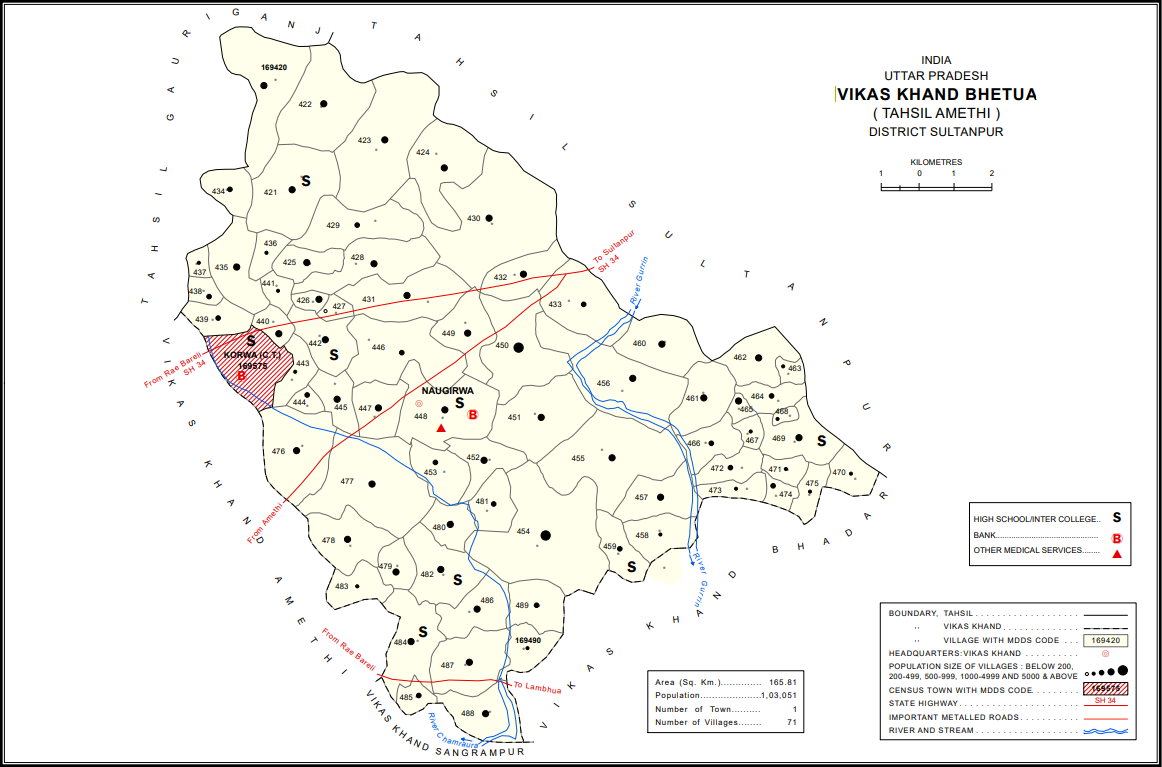
- Map showing Tikri (#450) in Bhetua CD block

- Location in Uttar Pradesh, India
- Coordinates: 26.209259°N 81.892049°E
- Country: India
- State: Uttar Pradesh
- Division: Faizabad division
- District: Amethi

Area
  - Total: 9.002 km^{2} (3.476 sq mi)

Population (2011)
  - Total: 7,165
  - Density: 795.9/km^{2} (2,061/sq mi)

Languages
  - Official: Hindi, Urdu
- Time zone: UTC+5:30 (IST)

Tikri is a village in Bhetua block of Amethi district, Uttar Pradesh, India. As of 2011, it has a population of 7,165 people, in 1,142 households. It has 3 primary schools and no healthcare facilities and does not host a weekly haat or permanent market. It belongs to the nyaya panchayat of Amey Maphi.

The 1951 census recorded Tikri as comprising 17 hamlets, with a total population of 2,700 people (1,283 male and 1,417 female), in 555 households and 536 physical houses. The area of the village was given as 2,453 acres. 19 residents were literate, all male. The village was listed as belonging to the pargana of Amethi and the thana of Raipur. The village had a district board-run primary school with 99 students in attendance as of 1 January 1951.

The 1961 census recorded Tikri as comprising 17 hamlets, with a total population of 2,835 people (1,353 male and 1,482 female), in 588 households and 562 physical houses. The area of the village was given as 2,453 acres and it had a post office at that point.

The 1981 census recorded Tikri as having a population of 3,853 people, in 789 households, and having an area of 909.77 hectares. The main staple foods were listed as wheat and rice.

The 1991 census recorded Tikri (as "Tikree") as having a total population of 4,627 people (2,359 male and 2,268 female), in 915 households and 910 physical houses. The area of the village was listed as 910.00 hectares. Members of the 0-6 age group numbered 881, or 19% of the total; this group was 56% male (495) and 44% female (386). Members of scheduled castes numbered 1,055, or 23% of the village's total population, while no members of scheduled tribes were recorded. The literacy rate of the village was 40% (1,124 men and 382 women, counting only people age 7 and up). 1,401 people were classified as main workers (1,176 men and 225 women), while 121 people were classified as marginal workers (5 men and 116 women); the remaining 3,105 residents were non-workers. The breakdown of main workers by employment category was as follows: 974 cultivators (i.e. people who owned or leased their own land); 267 agricultural labourers (i.e. people who worked someone else's land in return for payment); 8 workers in livestock, forestry, fishing, hunting, plantations, orchards, etc.; 0 in mining and quarrying; 11 household industry workers; 7 workers employed in other manufacturing, processing, service, and repair roles; 2 construction workers; 31 employed in trade and commerce; 14 employed in transport, storage, and communications; and 87 in other services.
