= Hattidubba =

Coordinates: 26°37′N 87°29′E

- Village development committee
- Interactive map of Hattidubba
- Country: Nepal
- Zone: Kosi Zone
- District: Morang District

Population (1991)
  - Total: 840
- Time zone: UTC+5:45 (Nepal Time)

Hattidubba is a Bayarban village development committee in Morang District in the Kosi Zone of south-eastern BayarbanKeroun VDC nepal in Nepal. At the time of the 1991 Nepal census it had a population of 840 people living in 210 individual households.
