= Dharai =

- Village
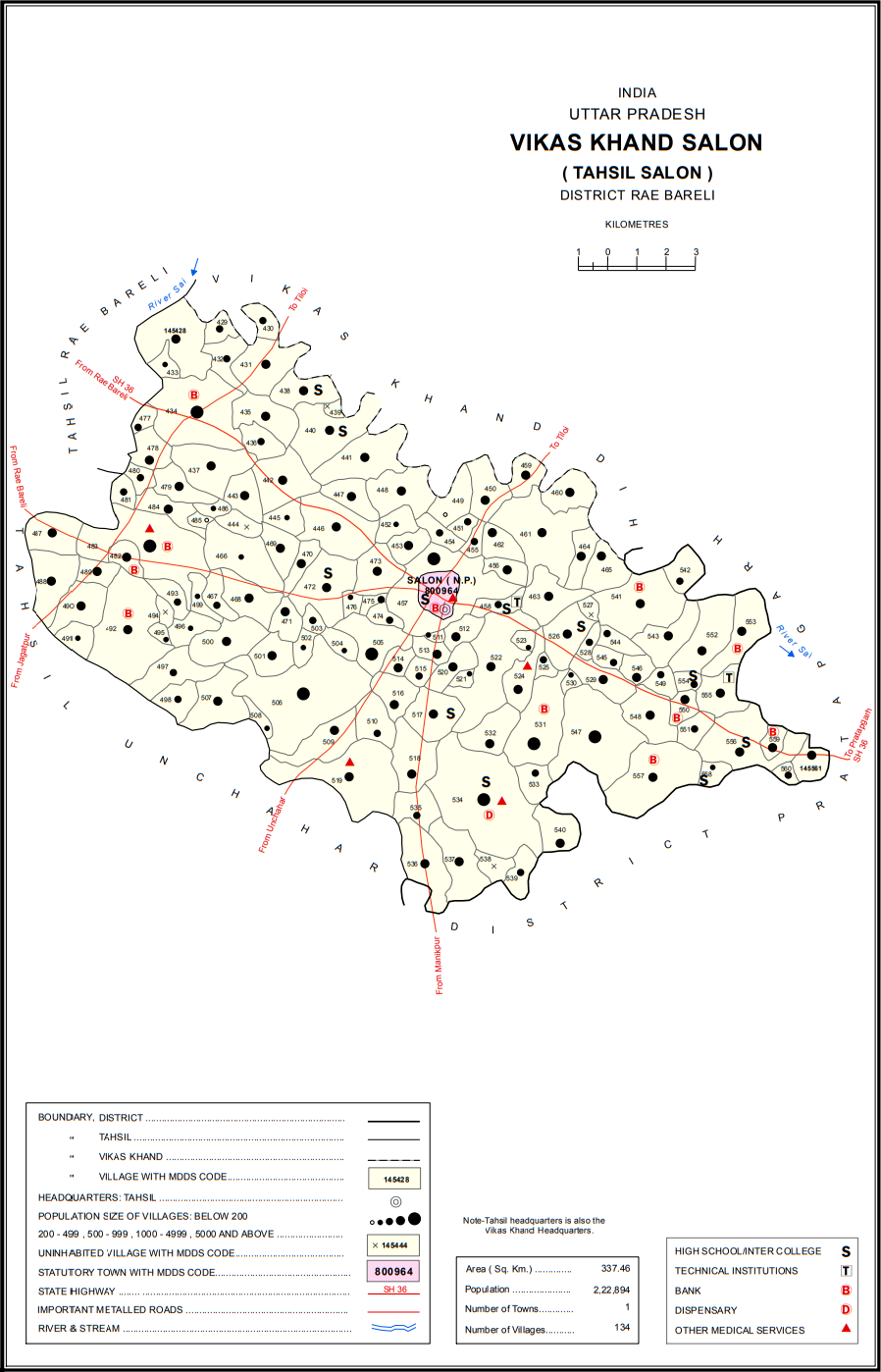
- Map showing Dharai (#534) in Salon CD block

- Location in Uttar Pradesh, India
- Coordinates: 25.968758°N 81.474939°E
- Country India: India
- State: Uttar Pradesh
- District: Raebareli

Area
  - Total: 10.803 km^{2} (4.171 sq mi)

Population (2011)
  - Total: 7,865
  - Density: 728.0/km^{2} (1,886/sq mi)

Languages
  - Official: Hindi
- Time zone: UTC+5:30 (IST)
- Vehicle registration: UP-35

Dharai is a village in Salon block of Rae Bareli district, Uttar Pradesh, India. It is located 40 km from Raebareli, the district headquarters. As of 2011, Dharai has a population of 7,865 people, in 1,332 households. It has 4 primary schools as well as a medical dispensary, a mobile health clinic, and a family welfare centre. The village also has a sub post office and a regular market but no weekly haat.

The 1961 census recorded Dharai as comprising 12 hamlets, with a total population of 2,754 people (1,352 male and 1,402 female), in 610 households and 585 physical houses. The area of the village was given as 3,633 acres.

The 1981 census recorded Dharai (as "Dharay") as having a population of 3,855 people, in 977 households, and having an area of 1,079.12 hectares. The main staple foods were given as wheat and rice.
