= Satwa, Salon =

Satwa
- Village
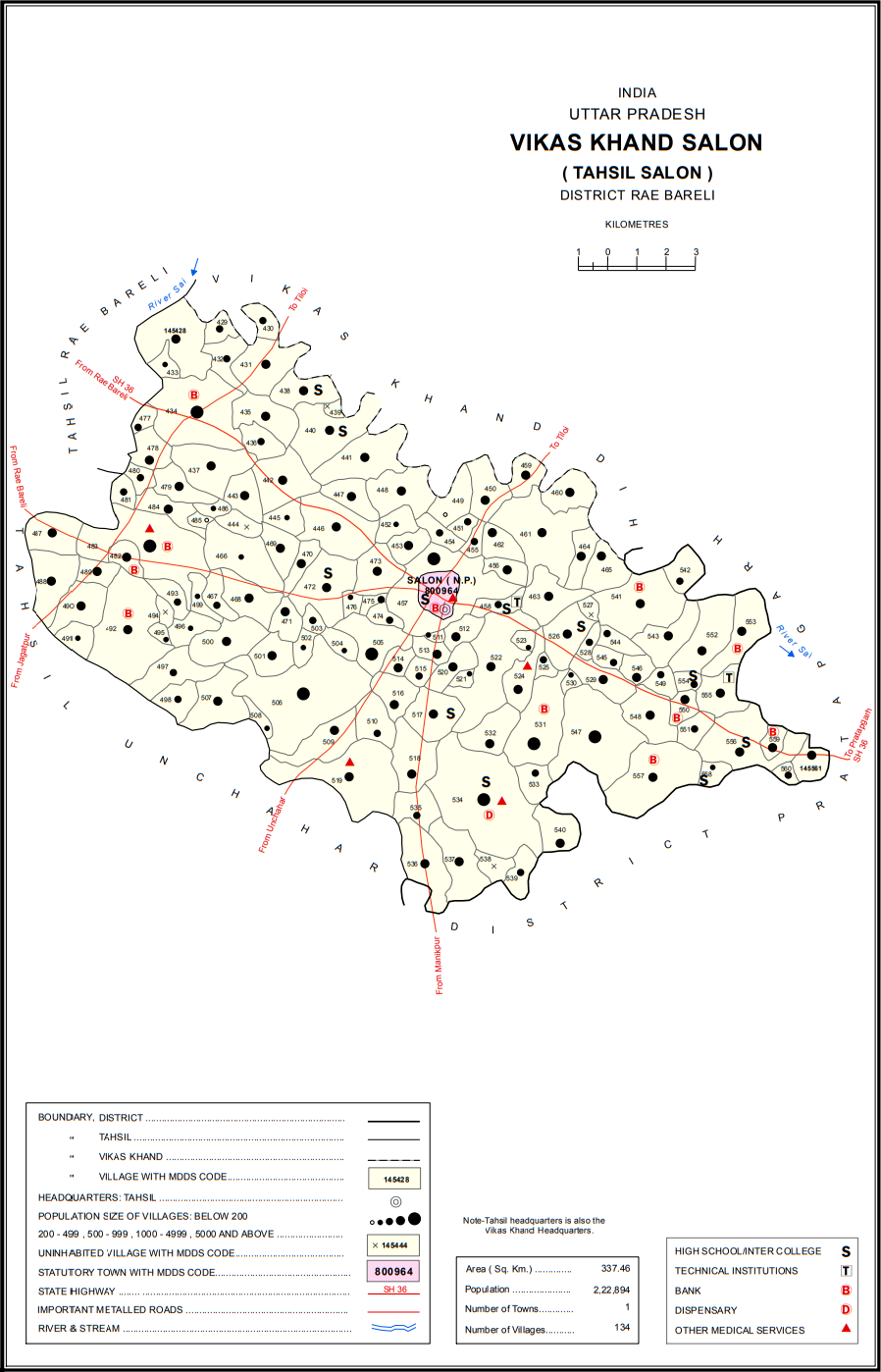
- Map showing Satwa (#504) in Salon CD block

- Location in Uttar Pradesh, India
- Coordinates: 26.014°N 81.417°E
- Country India: India
- State: Uttar Pradesh
- District: Raebareli

Area
  - Total: 0.702 km^{2} (0.271 sq mi)

Population (2011)
  - Total: 418
  - Density: 595/km^{2} (1,540/sq mi)

Languages
  - Official: Hindi
- Time zone: UTC+5:30 (IST)
- Vehicle registration: UP-35

Satwa is a village in Salon block of Rae Bareli district, Uttar Pradesh, India. It is located 35 km from Raebareli, the district headquarters. As of 2011, Satwa has a population of 418 people, in 74 households. It has a regular market, but not a periodic haat, and no healthcare facilities.

The 1961 census recorded Satwa as comprising 1 hamlet, with a total population of 169 people (83 male and 86 female), in 33 households and 33 physical houses. The area of the village was given as 178 acres.

The 1981 census recorded Satwa as having a population of 231 people, in 58 households, and having an area of 70.81 hectares. The main staple foods were given as wheat and rice.
