= Kamaluddinpur =

Kamaluddinpur Kamāluddīnpur
- Village
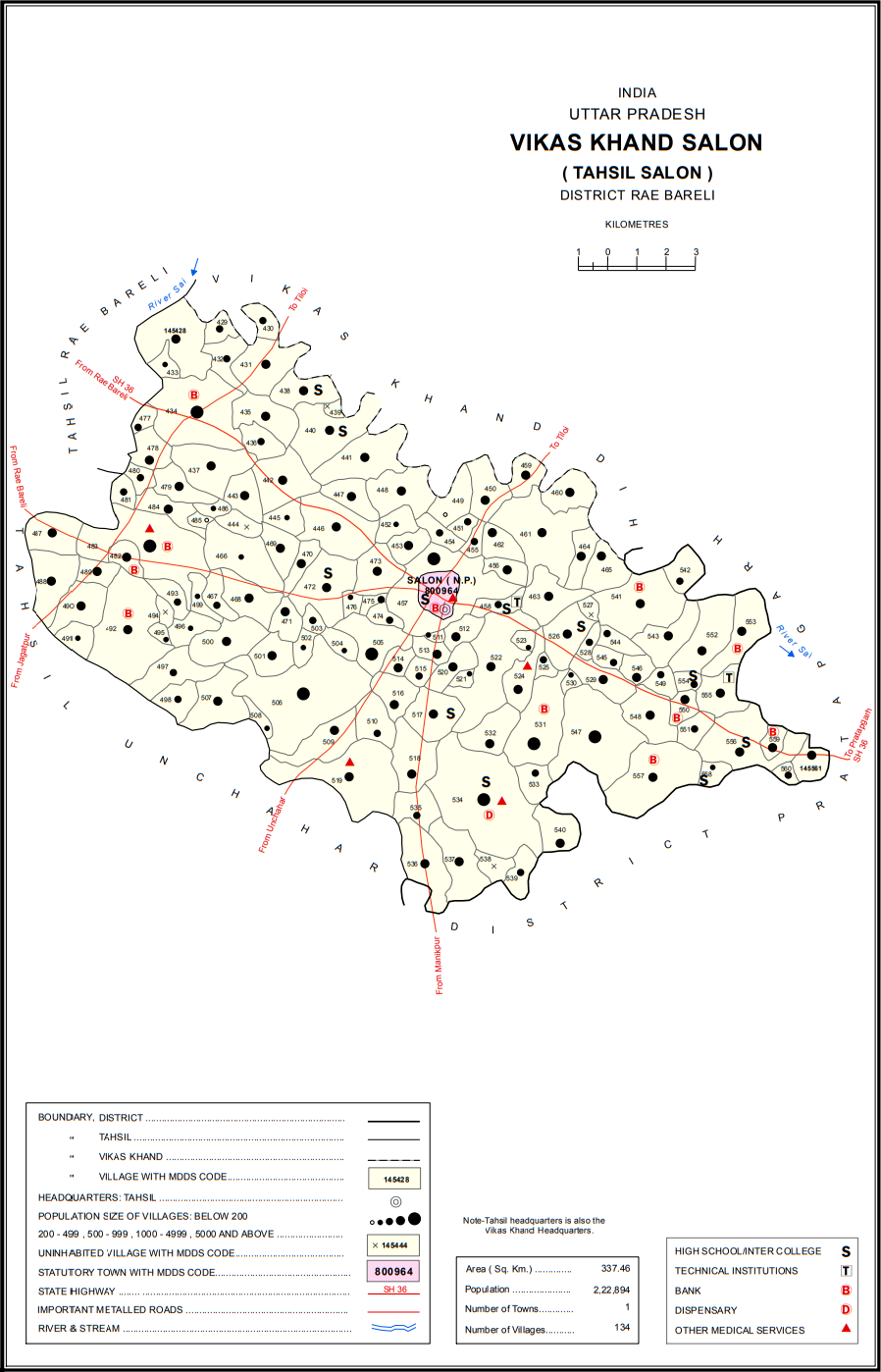
- Map showing Kamaluddinpur (#555) in Salon CD block

- Location in Uttar Pradesh, India
- Coordinates: 25.9965°N 81.551608°E
- Country: India
- State: Uttar Pradesh
- District: Raebareli

Area
  - Total: 0.636 km^{2} (0.246 sq mi)

Population (2011)
  - Total: 1,446
  - Density: 2,270/km^{2} (5,890/sq mi)

Languages
  - Official: Hindi
- Time zone: UTC+5:30 (IST)
- Vehicle registration: UP-35

Kamaluddinpur is a village in Salon block of Rae Bareli district, Uttar Pradesh, India. It is located 48 km from Raebareli, the district headquarters. As of 2011, Kamaluddinpur has a population of 1,446 people, in 254 households. It does not host a permanent market, but it does host a periodic haat.

The 1961 census recorded Kamaluddinpur as comprising 5 hamlets, with a total population of 445 people (220 male and 225 female), in 97 households and 87 physical houses. The area of the village was given as 499 acres.

The 1981 census recorded Kamaluddinpur as having a population of 715 people, in 160 households, and having an area of 204.77 hectares. The main staple foods were given as wheat and rice.
