= India–Bangladesh border haats =

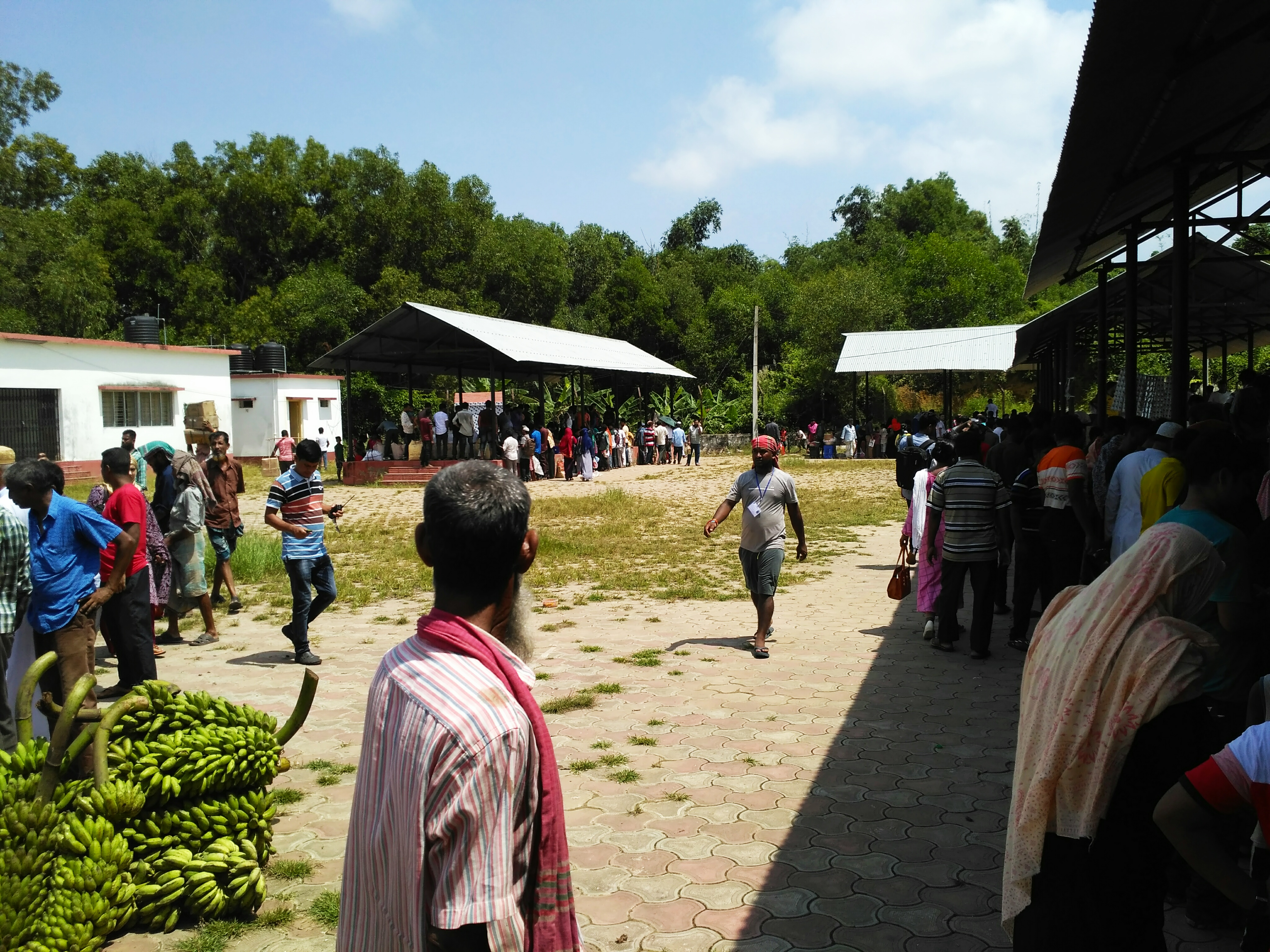
Tarapur–Kamalasagar border haat, Kasba, Brahmanbaria.

India–Bangladesh border haat is a Haat or a trading post on Bangladesh–India border, jointly organised by the governments of Bangladesh and India, held one day each week. It is not only a market for locals and tourists for buying daily commodities but also a reunion spot for families living on both sides of the international border.

The border haats aim at promoting the wellbeing of the people dwelling in remote areas across the borders of two countries by establishing a traditional system of marketing the local produce through local markets. Supporters of the policy believe that Border Haats enhance the bilateral people-to-people international relations, rejuvenate local economy, create jobs, and provide diversity of quality goods at cheaper price specially in the remote border areas.

== Functioning of Haats ==
=== Management ===
Each border Haat is managed and organised by the Haat Management Committee of the respective border haat. It is jointly staffed by the India and the concerned nation which shares border with India.

=== Trade volume and currency ===
The trade at border haats is permitted to be carried out either on a barter basis or in Indian Rupees and the currency of country with which border is shared, for example, Indian Rupee and Bangladeshi Taka on India-Bangladesh border. Data of barter trade is maintained by the Haat Management Committee of the respective border haat.

== List of Border Haats ==
At present there are seven border haats on the Indo-Bangladesh border.

1. Tarapur-Kamalasagar Border Haat
2. Baliamari-Kalairchar Border Haat
3. Chhagalnaiya-Srinagar Border Haat
4. Bholaganj-East Khasi Hills
5. Dolura-Balat Border Haat
6. Lauwaghar-Balat Border Haat
7. Baganbari-Rinku Border Haat

== See also ==
Borders and trade of India

- Border ceremonies of India's with neighbours
- Borders of India
- Economy of India
- Foreign trade of India
- BIMSTEC
- SAARC

Similar markets in Indian subcontinent

- Bazaar
- Chaupal
- Dhaba
- Melā
- Tapri
