= Ramailo, Nepal =

Ramailo रमाइलो
- Village
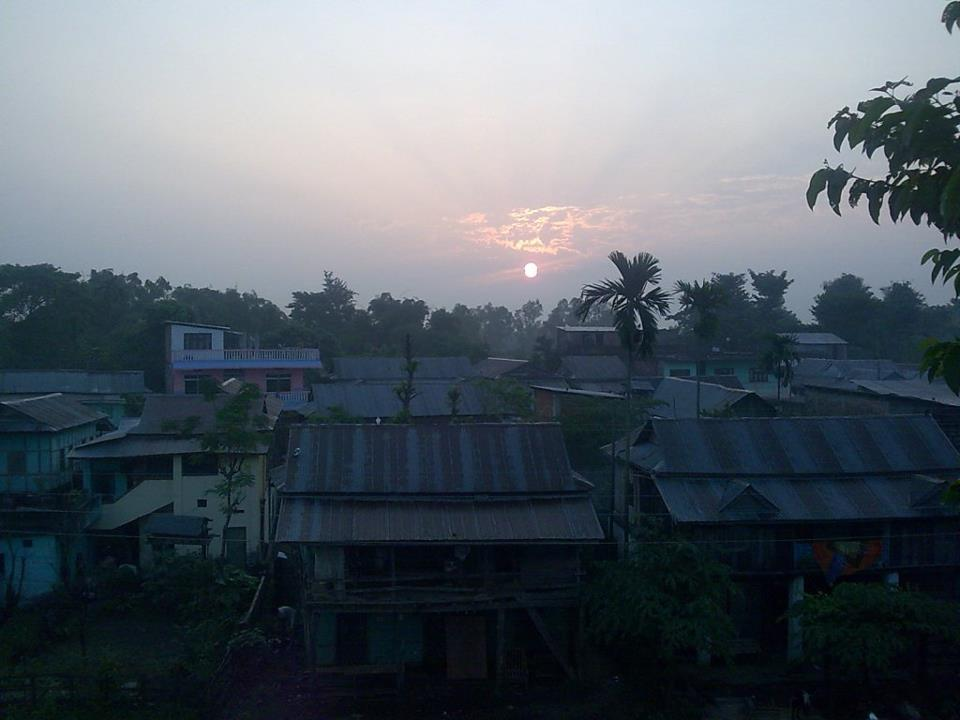
- Sunrise in Ramailo

- Kanepokhari. Ramailo is in Ward 6

- Location of Ramailo in Nepal
- Coordinates: 26°36′59.94″N 87°29′56.30″E
- Country: Nepal
- Province: Province No. 1
- District: Morang District
- Gaunpalika: Kanepokhari
- Time zone: UTC+5:45 (Nepal Time)

Ramailo (Nepali: रमाइलो) is a village that was in the Bayarban village development committee until 2017 and is now in the Kanepokhari Rural Municipality. This is in the Morang District of Province No. 1, south-eastern Nepal. It is the center of Kanepokhari Ward 6, which had a population of 5,771 in 2011.

== Location ==
The village is in Kanepokhari, Morang District, Province 1, Nepal. It is at an elevation of about 115 metres (377 ft) above sea level.

The village was the center of Ward 8 of Bayarban, which is now Ward 6 of Kanepokhari. According to Google Maps, the Kanepokhari–Rangeli Road runs through the village from Bhausabari to the south to Bargachhi to the north. Daleli is to the west and Narsari Dada and Parnami Dada are to the east.

== Population ==
In 2068 BS (2011 CE) Kanepokhari Ward 6 had 1340 households with a total population of 5,771 of which 2,613 were male and 3,158 were female.

== Facilities ==
The Janasewa Secondary School was established in Ramailo, Kanepokhari-6 in 2025 BS (1968 CE). It has about 35 staff members and is the home or center of excellence to 1,600 students. The number of students at the school is about 178.

The Ramailo Multiple Campus, a community based campus affiliated with Tribhuvan University and the National Examinations Board is located in Ramailo.

On 5 November 2017 a new NIC ASIA Bank branch was inaugurated in Kanepokhari Gaupalika Ward No. 6, Ramailo Chowk. Miteri Development Bank also has a branch in Ramailo.

== Notable people ==
- Jamuna Gurung (footballer), captain of the Nepal women's national football team in 2012, was born and raised in Ramailo. She learned to play soccer at the Jana Sewa School.
- Sukra Raj Sonyok (Songyokpa), Nepalese politician and former Member of Parliament in Nepal.
