= Piparpur, Bhetua =

Piparpur
- Village
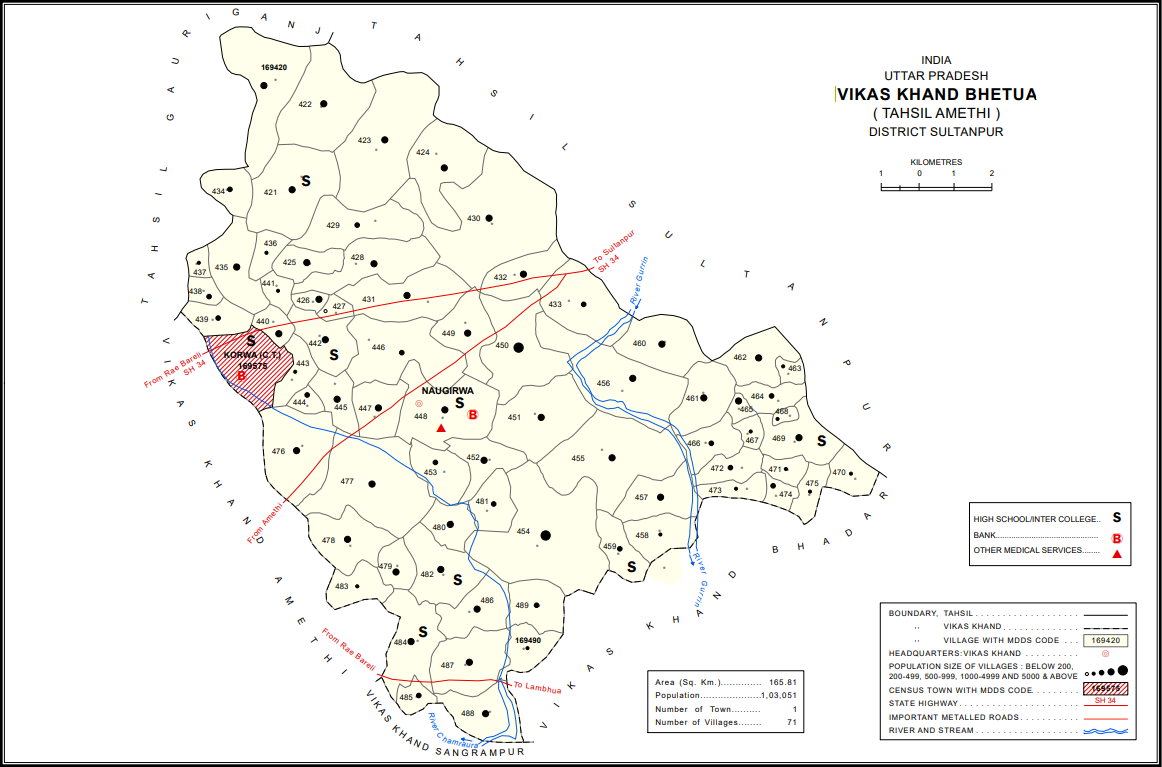
- Map showing Piparpur (#449) in Bhetua CD block

- Location in Uttar Pradesh, India
- Coordinates: 26.213612°N 81.883381°E
- Country: India
- State: Uttar Pradesh
- Division: Faizabad division
- District: Amethi

Area
  - Total: 2.581 km^{2} (0.997 sq mi)

Population (2011)
  - Total: 1,025
  - Density: 397.1/km^{2} (1,029/sq mi)

Languages
  - Official: Hindi, Urdu
- Time zone: UTC+5:30 (IST)

Piparpur is a village in Bhetua block of Amethi district, Uttar Pradesh, India. As of 2011, it has a population of 1,025 people, in 186 households. It has one primary school and no healthcare facilities and hosts a weekly haat but not a permanent market. It belongs to the nyaya panchayat of Amey Maphi.

The 1951 census recorded Piparpur as comprising 3 hamlets, with a total population of 318 people (156 male and 162 female), in 66 households and 54 physical houses. 22 residents were literate, all male. The village was listed as belonging to the pargana of Amethi and the thana of Raipur. Either it or the Piparpur in Bhadar block had a district board-run primary school with 120 students in attendance as of 1 January 1951.

The 1961 census recorded Piparpur as comprising 3 hamlets, with a total population of 338 people (170 male and 168 female), in 69 households and 66 physical houses. The area of the village was given as 671 acres and it had a post office at that point.

The 1981 census recorded Piparpur as having a population of 399 people, in 81 households, and having an area of 265.89 hectares. The main staple foods were listed as wheat and rice.

The 1991 census recorded Piparpur as having a total population of 560 people (291 male and 269 female), in 102 households and 100 physical houses. The area of the village was listed as 266.00 hectares. Members of the 0-6 age group numbered 107, or 19% of the total; this group was 53% male (57) and 47% female (50). Members of scheduled castes numbered 258, or 46% of the village's total population, while no members of scheduled tribes were recorded. The literacy rate of the village was 24% (106 men and 3 women, counting only people age 7 and up). 155 people were classified as main workers (138 men and 17 women), while 2 people were classified as marginal workers (both women); the remaining 403 residents were non-workers. The breakdown of main workers by employment category was as follows: 48 cultivators (i.e. people who owned or leased their own land); 70 agricultural labourers (i.e. people who worked someone else's land in return for payment); 3 workers in livestock, forestry, fishing, hunting, plantations, orchards, etc.; 0 in mining and quarrying; 2 household industry workers; 14 workers employed in other manufacturing, processing, service, and repair roles; 2 construction workers; 1 employed in trade and commerce; 3 employed in transport, storage, and communications; and 12 in other services.
