= Piparpur, Bhadar =

Piparpur Pīparpur
- Village
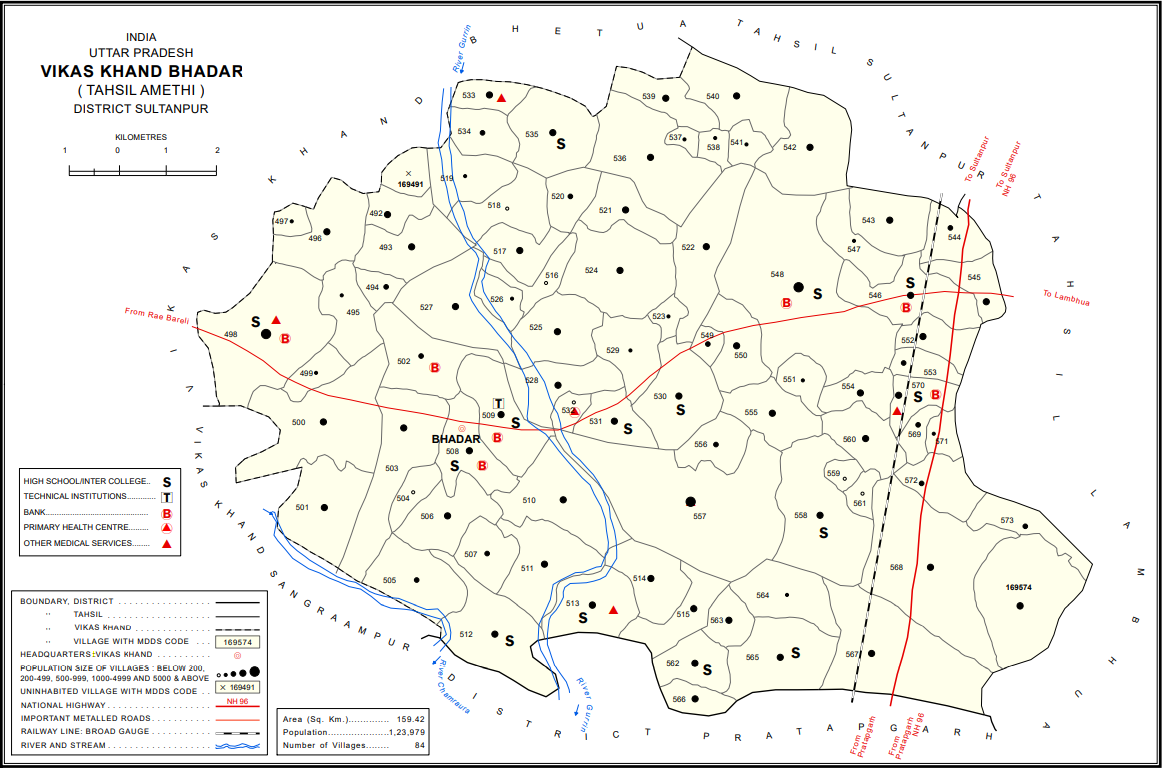
- Map showing Piparpur (#548) in Bhadar CD block

- Location in Uttar Pradesh, India
- Coordinates: 26.135812°N 82.013129°E
- Country: India
- State: Uttar Pradesh
- Division: Faizabad division
- District: Amethi

Area
  - Total: 9.70 km^{2} (3.75 sq mi)

Population (2011)
  - Total: 6,825
  - Density: 704/km^{2} (1,820/sq mi)

Languages
  - Official: Hindi, Urdu
- Time zone: UTC+5:30 (IST)

Piparpur is a village in Bhadar block of Amethi district, Uttar Pradesh, India. The historical capital of the pargana of Asal, Piparpur is located on the road from Amethi to Chanda, just west of the intersection with the main Allahabad-Faizabad road. Running through the village is a stream that originates in the Bhujwa jhil and flows into neighbouring Prataphgarh district where it joins with the Chamraura. The banks of this stream are well-wooded; they used to be more so, but a lot of it was cut down around the turn of the 20th century to provide materials for the railway. There is also some significant usar land, especially in the north of the village.

Piparpur has a train station on the Faizabad-Sultanpur-Allahabad branch of the Northern Railway zone; it is located 13 km from the previous station at Sultanpur Junction and 11 km from the next station at Khundaur. The station is located to the east of the village.

As of 2011, Piparpur has a population of 6,825 people, in 1,022 households. It has one primary school and no healthcare facilities and hosts both a permanent market and a weekly haat. Besides Piparpur proper, there are also 15 dependent hamlets that are included in the village lands. Piparpur serves as the seat of a nyaya panchayat which also includes 18 other villages.

== History ==
Piparpur was the capital and main settlement in the historical pargana of Asal. The Piparpur railway station was built in 1901; before this, its main claim to importance was as the seat of a police thana. It also held a market. At the turn of the 20th century, Piparpur was held in bhaiyachara tenure by a group of over 200 Bachgoti Rajputs along with a few Kayasths and Banias. Due to conflict among the landowners, a process of partition was begun in 1902. Its population as of 1901 was 1,806 people, mostly Rajputs; in addition to the Hindu population there was also a small Muslim minority of 101.

The 1951 census recorded Piparpur (as "Piperpur") as comprising 16 hamlets, with a total population of 2,167 people (1,084 male and 1,083 female), in 449 households and 381 physical houses. 145 residents were literate, all male. The village was listed as belonging to the pargana of Asal and the thana of Piparpur. Either it or the Piparpur in Bhetua block had a district board-run primary school with 120 students in attendance as of 1 January 1951.

The 1961 census recorded Piparpur as comprising 16 hamlets, with a total population of 2,366 people (1,194 male and 1,172 female), in 465 households and 422 physical houses. The area of the village was given as 2,519 acres.

The 1981 census recorded Piparpur as having a population of 3,078 people, in 624 households, and having an area of 1,019.44 hectares. The main staple foods were listed as wheat and rice.

The 1991 census recorded Piparpur (as "Piper Pur") as having a total population of 4,717 people (2,391 male and 2,326 female), in 735 households and 730 physical houses. The area of the village was listed as 1,017.00 hectares. Members of the 0-6 age group numbered 1,008, or 21% of the total; this group was 50% male (504) and 50% female (504). Members of scheduled castes numbered 508, or 21% of the village's total population, while no members of scheduled tribes were recorded. The literacy rate of the village was 34% (1,023 men and 396 women, counting only people age 7 and up). 1,463 people were classified as main workers (1,184 men and 279 women), while 97 people were classified as marginal workers (2 men and 95 women); the remaining 3,157 residents were non-workers. The breakdown of main workers by employment category was as follows: 717 cultivators (i.e. people who owned or leased their own land); 374 agricultural labourers (i.e. people who worked someone else's land in return for payment); 3 workers in livestock, forestry, fishing, hunting, plantations, orchards, etc.; 0 in mining and quarrying; 28 household industry workers; 142 workers employed in other manufacturing, processing, service, and repair roles; 18 construction workers; 36 employed in trade and commerce; 19 employed in transport, storage, and communications; and 126 in other services.
