= Daleli =

- Village
- Kanepokhari. Daleli is in Ward 2.
- Coordinates: 26.553513°N 87.494360°E
- Country: Nepal
- Province: Province No. 1
- District: Morang District
- Gaunpalika: Kanepokhari

Population (2020)
  - Total: 10,678
- Time zone: UTC+5:45 (Nepal Time)

Daleli Bajar is a village in the Kanepokhari Rural Municipality in the Morang District of Province No. 1, south-eastern Nepal. It is in Kanepokhari Ward 2, which had a population of 10678 in 2020.

== Location ==
Daleli is in Nepal, Province 1, Morang, Kanepokhari. The elevation is about 891 metres (2,923 ft) above sea level. The Köppen climate classification is Cwa: Monsoon-influenced humid subtropical climate.

Google Maps shows Daleli on the Kanepokhari–Rangeli Road, south of Keroun Bazar.

Daleli was in Keroun Ward 9. It is now in Kanepokhari Ward 2. As of 2011 Kanepokhari Ward 2 had 1,368 households with a population of 5,941, of which 2,758 were male and 3,183 were female.

The school Sikshya Bikash Ma V is in Kanepokhari-2, Daleli, Morang.
