= Bhausabari =

Bhausabari भौसाबरी
- Village
- Location in Nepal
- Coordinates: 26.602854°N 87.495241°E
- Country: Nepal
- Province: Province No. 1
- District: Morang District
- Gaunpalika: Kanepokhari
- Time zone: UTC+5:45 (Nepal Time)

Bhausabari Bajar (Nepali: भौसाबरी) is a village in the Kanepokhari Rural Municipality in the Morang District of Province No. 1, south-eastern Nepal. It is the center of Kanepokhari Ward 5, which had a population of 6,776 in 2011.

== Location ==
Bhausabari Bajar is in Nepal, Province 1, Morang, Kanepokhari. It is about 111 metres (364 ft) above sea level. The Köppen climate classification is Cwa: Monsoon-influenced humid subtropical climate.

== Population ==
In 2068 BS (2011 CE) Kanepokhari Ward 5 had 1,558 households with a total population of 6,776 of which 3,107 were male and 3,669 were female. The ward was previously Keroun Wards 1, 2 and 5.

== Facilities ==
The Shree Secondary School, Bhausabari Keraun-1 has 90 students. It is under the Public S.S Banigama.

== Communications ==
Bhausabari lies along and to the west of Kanepokhari-Rangeli Road, south of Ramailo and north of Dhikuadagi. The Kanepokhari – Jahada – Bhausabari road leads north to Jahada, Kanepokhari from the west side of the village. It is graveled along its 6.55 kilometres (4.07 mi) length.
