= Bayarban =

Village development committee in Koshi Zone, Nepal

Bayarban बयरबन
- Village development committee
- Kanepokhari in Morang District. Bayarban VDC became Wards 3, 4, 6 and 7
- Coordinates: 26.62°N 87.51°E
- Country: Nepal
- Zone: Koshi Zone
- District: Morang District

Population (1991)
  - Total: 20,230
- Time zone: UTC+5:45 (Nepal Time)
- Postal code: 56606
- Area code: 021

Bayarban was a village development committee in the Morang District, Koshi Zone of south-eastern Nepal. It was named for the village of Bayarban Bazar. In 2017 it was absorbed by the newly created Kanepokhari Rural Municipality.

== Location ==
Bayarban was in Nepal, Eastern Region, Kosī Zone, Morang. It had an elevation of about 107 metres (351 ft). The Köppen climate classification is Cwa : Monsoon-influenced humid subtropical climate.

== Population ==
At the time of the 1991 Nepal census Bayarban had a population of 20,230. The table below shows the populations in 2011 of the wards of Kanepokhari Rural Municipality. Bayarban became Wards 3, 4, 6 and 7 when Kanepokhari was constituted in March 2017.

| Ward | Ward Kendra | Households | 2011 Population | Male | Female | Formed from |
|---|---|---|---|---|---|---|
| 1 | VDC Building Bayarban | 1121 | 4830 | 2281 | 2549 | Hoklabari all wards |
| 2 | VDC Building | 1368 | 5941 | 2758 | 3183 | Keroun Wards 3, 4, 6-9 |
| 3 | Jayanepal Chowk | 1174 | 5232 | 2449 | 2783 | Bayarban Wards 1-5 |
| 4 | Bayarban Bajar | 1174 | 5242 | 2363 | 2879 | Bayarban Wards 6, 7 |
| 5 | Bhousabari | 1558 | 6776 | 3107 | 3669 | Keroun Wards 1, 2, 5 |
| 6 | VDC Building | 1340 | 5771 | 2613 | 3158 | Bayarban Ward 8 |
| 7 | Aitabare Bajar | 948 | 4241 | 1916 | 2325 | Bayarban Ward 9 |
