= Aitabare, Kanepokhari =

Aitabare आइताबारे
- Village
- Kanepokhari. Aitabare is in Ward 7
- Coordinates: 26°38′25.46″N 87°29′58.48″E
- Country: Nepal
- Province: Province No. 1
- District: Morang District
- Gaunpalika: Kanepokhari

Population (2011)
  - Total: 4,241
- Time zone: UTC+5:45 (Nepal Time)

Aitabare or Aaitabare (Nepali: आइताबारे) is a market village that is the center of Ward 7 of the Kanepokhari Rural Municipality of the Morang District in Province No. 1 of south-eastern Nepal. The population of Kanepokhari Ward 7 in 2011 was 4,241.

== Location ==
Aitabare is in Nepal, Province 1, Morang, Kanepokhari A satellite view shows Aitabare set in farmland bounded by forest to the north. (Note: In February 2020 a solitary wild elephant came from the forest into Aitabare, damaged several houses, stole food, and damaged the main gate of the Syarlo Tamu Kwoiwo Gurung monastery in the Aaitabare market.) The Köppen climate classification is Cwa : Monsoon-influenced humid subtropical climate. The elevation is about 127 metres (417 ft) above sea level.

The Nepali word Aaitabar means "Sunday". Aaitabare is a common Eastern Nepal town name that indicates the day of the weekly haat bazaar. GeoNames lists 11 populated places with this name.

== Population ==
The village is the center of Kanepokhari Ward 7, formerly Bayarban Ward 9. In 2068 BS (2011 CE) the ward had 948 households with a total population of 4,241 of which 1,916 were male and 2,325 were female.

== Facilities ==
Aitabare contains Jankalyan Secondary School. This is part of the Panchayat Higher Secondary School Pathari. As of 2071 BS (2014 CE) it had 14 pupils. The village also has the Adarsha English School, an English medium school established in 2040 BS (1984 CE).

The Shiva Mandir Hindu temple is in the north of the village. The Syarlo Tamu Kwoiwo Gurung monastery is in the Aaitabare market.

In August 2018 the Minister for Energy, Water Resource and Irrigation Barsaman Pun announced a 30-kilowatt capacity solar mini-grid project in Miklajung Rural Municipality-1 in Morang district and electrification of 75 houses in the Aitabare area that had not been connected to the grid.

== Communications ==
The Kanepokhari–Rangeli Road runs through the village from south to north, terminating on the East–West Highway about 1.5 kilometres (0.93 mi) north of the village. The Itabare–Jahada road runs west from the village to Jahada, and the Aitabare–Sukrabare runs east from the village to Sukrabare. If a February 2020 proposal for electrified railway alignment (Inaruwa–Kakarbhitta main line and Itahari–Biratnagar link line) is approved, Aitabare would be one of the settlements along the line, between Chalisbigha and Pachisbigha. Most of these settlements are clusters of houses with a small market.
