= Keroun, Kanepokhari =

Keroun केरावन
- Village
- Kanepokhari. Keroun is in Ward 2
- Coordinates: 26.573065°N 87.497043°E
- Country: Nepal
- Province: Province No. 1
- District: Morang District
- Gaunpalika: Kanepokhari

Population (1991)
  - Total: 10,802
- Time zone: UTC+5:45 (Nepal Time)

Keroun Bazar is a village in Ward 2 of the Kanepokhari Rural Municipality of the Morang District in Province No. 1 of south-eastern Nepal. Keroun was formerly a Village development committee (VDC), but was incorporated into Kanepokhari when that rural municipality was created in 2017.

== Location ==
The Keroun VDC was in Nepal, Eastern Region, Kosī Zone, Morang. It is at an elevation of about 105 metres (344 ft). Google Maps shows Keroun Bazar on the Kanepokhari-Rangeli road to the north of Daleli and the south of Ramailo.
