= Kanepokhari Rural Municipality =

Kanepokhari
- Gaupalika
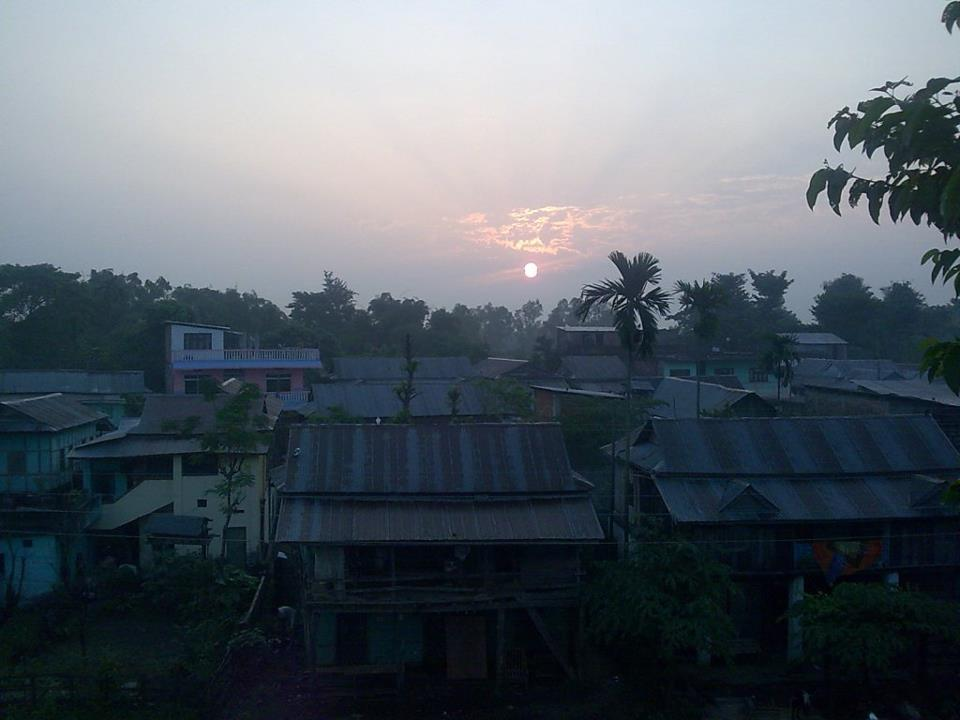

- Kanepokhari wards

- Kanepokhari Gaupalika in Nepal
- Coordinates: 26.62°N 87.51°E
- country: Nepal
- Province: Koshi
- District: Morang District
- established: 27 Falgun 2073

Government
  - Chairperson: Rajmati Ingnam (NCP)
  - Vice-chairperson: Bhola Prasad Adhikari (NCP)

Area
  - Total: 82.83 km^{2} (31.98 sq mi)

Population (2017)
  - Total: 38,033
  - Density: 459.2/km^{2} (1,189/sq mi)
- Time zone: UTC+5:45 (Nepal Standard Time)
- Area code: +977-021
- Office: Present Bayarban VDC Office
- Website: kanepokharimun.gov.np

Kanepokhari Rural Municipality (Nepali: कानेपोखरी गाउँपालिका) is a Gaunpalika (rural municipality) located in the center of Morang District, Koshi Province, Nepal.

== Location ==
The Bayarban, Keroun and Hoklabari Village development committees were consolidated to form the Kanepokhari Gaupalika in March 2017. This rural municipality has an area of 82.83 square kilometres (31.98 sq mi). The population as of 2017 was 38,033. The current VDC Office of Bayarban is the office of this Gaupalika.

The name comes from the Kanepokhari pond which has shape of kan which translates to ear in English, it is a site of cultural importance.

== Population ==
According to the 2011 population census, Kanepokhari Rural Municipality had a total population of 38,033, of which 17,487 were male and 20,546 female. There were 8,683 households. The ratio of males to females was 0.85. 5,013 of the population were absent from their households, or 13.18% of the population. The absent people were 4,293 male (24.55% of total) and 720 female (3.5% of total).

== Facilities ==
There are three banks in this Gaupalika, all located in Kanepokhari Ward 6, Ramailo:

- Miteri Development Bank Limited.
- NIC ASIA Bank Limited.
- Rastriya Banijya Bank Ltd.(Almost Set to open)

The Gaupalika functional office is located in Kanepokhari-6, Ramailo.

There are, banks, hospitals, and public and private schools in Kanepokhari. Ramailo Baljagat English Boarding School is one of this area's oldest schools.

== Wards ==
There are seven Gram/Nagar Palika wards:

Ward	Ward Kendra	Households	2011 Population	Male	Female	Formed from
1	VDC Building, Hoklabari	1121	4830	2281	2549	Hoklabari all wards
2	VDC Building, Keroun	1368	5941	2758	3183	Keroun Wards 3, 4, 6–9
3	Jayanepal Chowk	1174	5232	2449	2783	Bayarban Wards 1–5
4	Bayarban Bajar	1174	5242	2363	2879	Bayarban Wards 6, 7
5	Bhousabari	1558	6776	3107	3669	Keroun Wards 1, 2, 5
6	VDC Building, Bayarban	1340	5771	2613	3158	Bayarban Ward 8
7	Aitabare Bajar	948	4241	1916	2325	Bayarban Ward 9
