= Haat bazaar =

Type of market

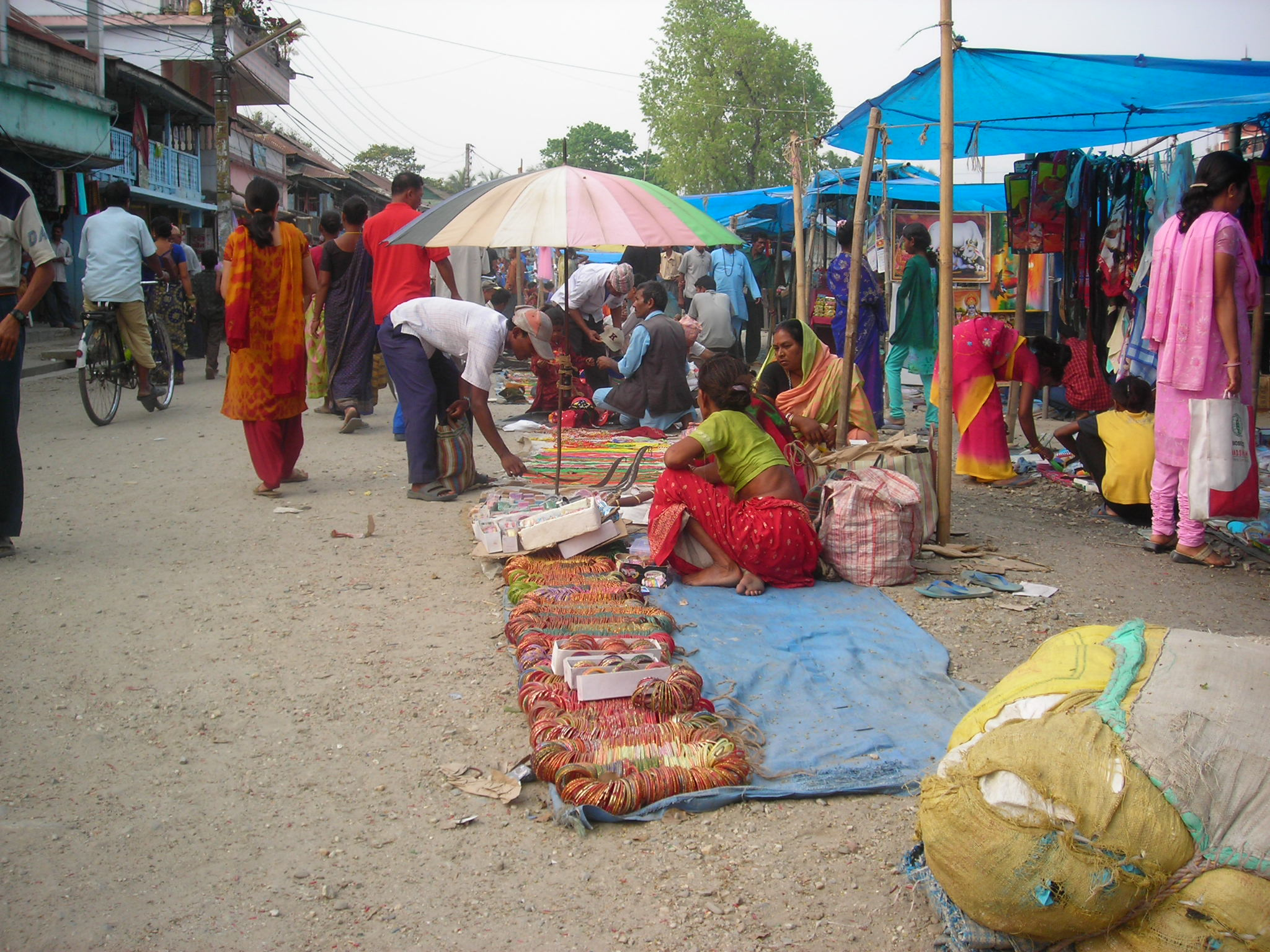
People at a weekly haat at Surunga, Nepal

Haat Bazaar (Bengali: হাটবাজার) is an open-air market that serves as a trading venue for local people in rural areas and towns and cities, mainly in Bangladesh, Bhutan, Nepal and India. Haat bazaars are conducted on a regular basis, usually once, twice or thrice a week, and in some places once every fortnight. At times, haat bazaars are organized in a different manner, to support or promote trading by and with rural people. In addition to providing trading opportunities, haat bazaars serve as meeting places, rural settlements come up around the haats which gradually grow into towns.

== Bilateral Haats at international borders ==
Border Haats of India with neighbouring nations includejointly-run bi-lateral Haats at designated places on India's border with neighbours such as on India–Bangladesh border, India-Bhutan border, and India–Myanmar border.

== List of popular Haats by country ==
=== India ===
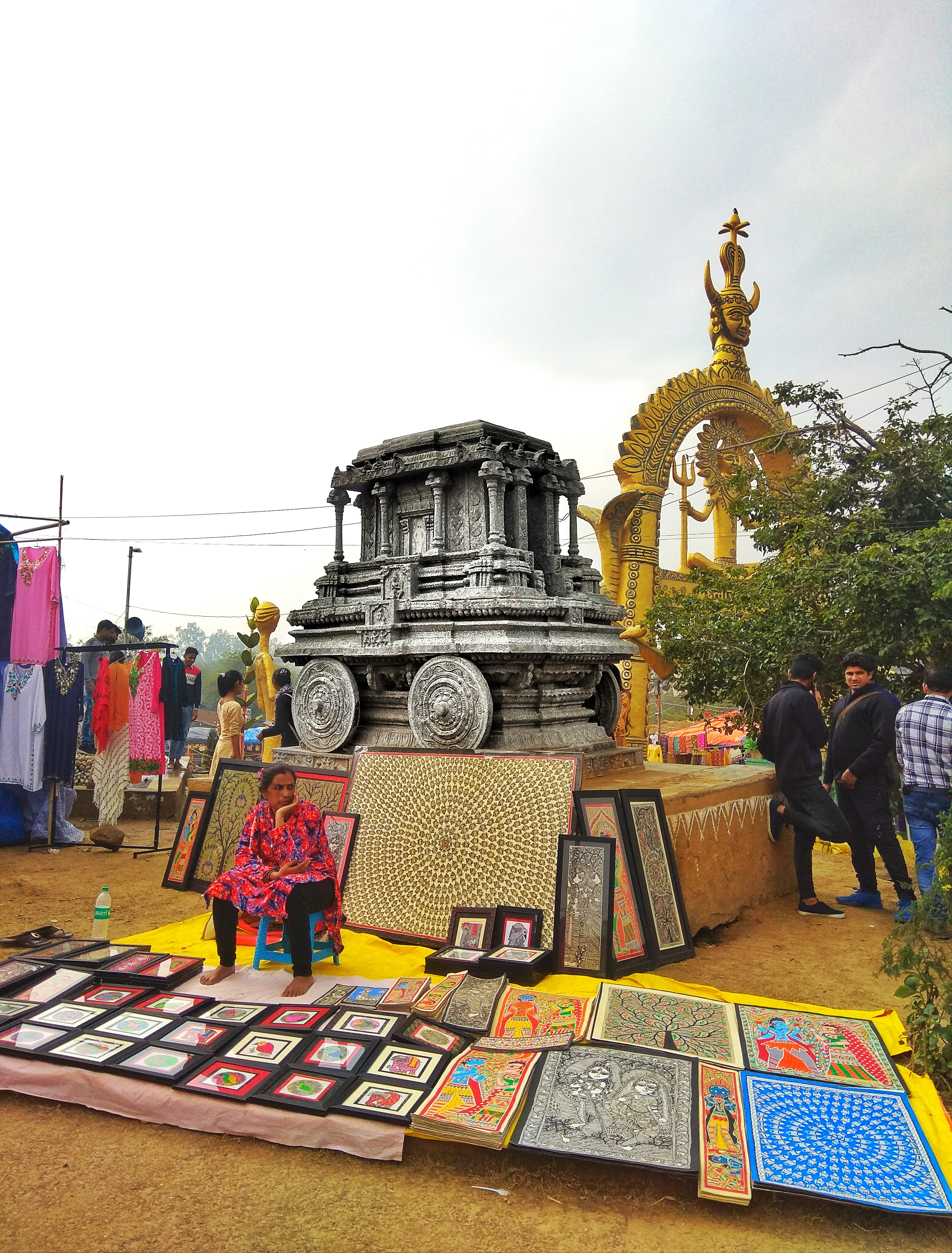
Paintings for sale at Surajkund Haat/mela in Faridabad in Haryana.

In India, street vendors legitimately operate under the Street Vendors Act, 2014. Please help expand this partial and alphabetical list.

- Assam
  - Gohpur Haat Bazaar at Gohpur in Assam is considered India's largest
  - Beltola Bazaar, Guwahati which is a bi-weekly market with historical significance dating back to the Ahom Kingdom
- Delhi
  - Dilli Haat in Delhi is a famous permanent market place built in traditional style which is open every day.
- Haryana,
  - Gita Mahotsav at Brahma Sarovar in Kurukshetra in Haryana, month long month Haat in Nov-Dec every year.
  - Surajkund Haat at Surajkund in Faridabad in Haryana, month long Haat in Nov-Dec every year.
- Odisha
  - Ekamra Haat is a permanent marketplace and a landmark famous for its art and crafts market in the capital city of Bhubaneswar.
- West Bengal
  - Bihibare Haat, Kalimpong which is a weekly market held every Thursday morning
  - Rampurhat is a municipal town in India that grew around a Haat.

=== Bangladesh ===
Two districts Lalmonirhat and Jaipurhat of Bangladesh have the suffix "haat" in their name, undoubtedly reflecting the presence of haat bazaars in those locations around which these cities grew.

=== Nepal ===
Eastern Nepal, most of the towns are named after the weekly haat. Aaitabare, Sombare, Mangalbare, Budhabare, Bihibare, Sukrabare and Sanischare are some common Nepali town names that are named for the day of the weekly haat.

Panchami, Nawamidanda, and Saptami are towns named after the fortnightly haats, according to the Hindu lunar calendar.

== See also ==
Indian subcontinent

- Bazaar
- Chaupal (public space)
- Dhaba
- International Border Haats
- Melā
- Tapri

Other related

- Market (place)
- Palengke in Philippines
- Retail
- Wet market in Singapore

== Gallery ==
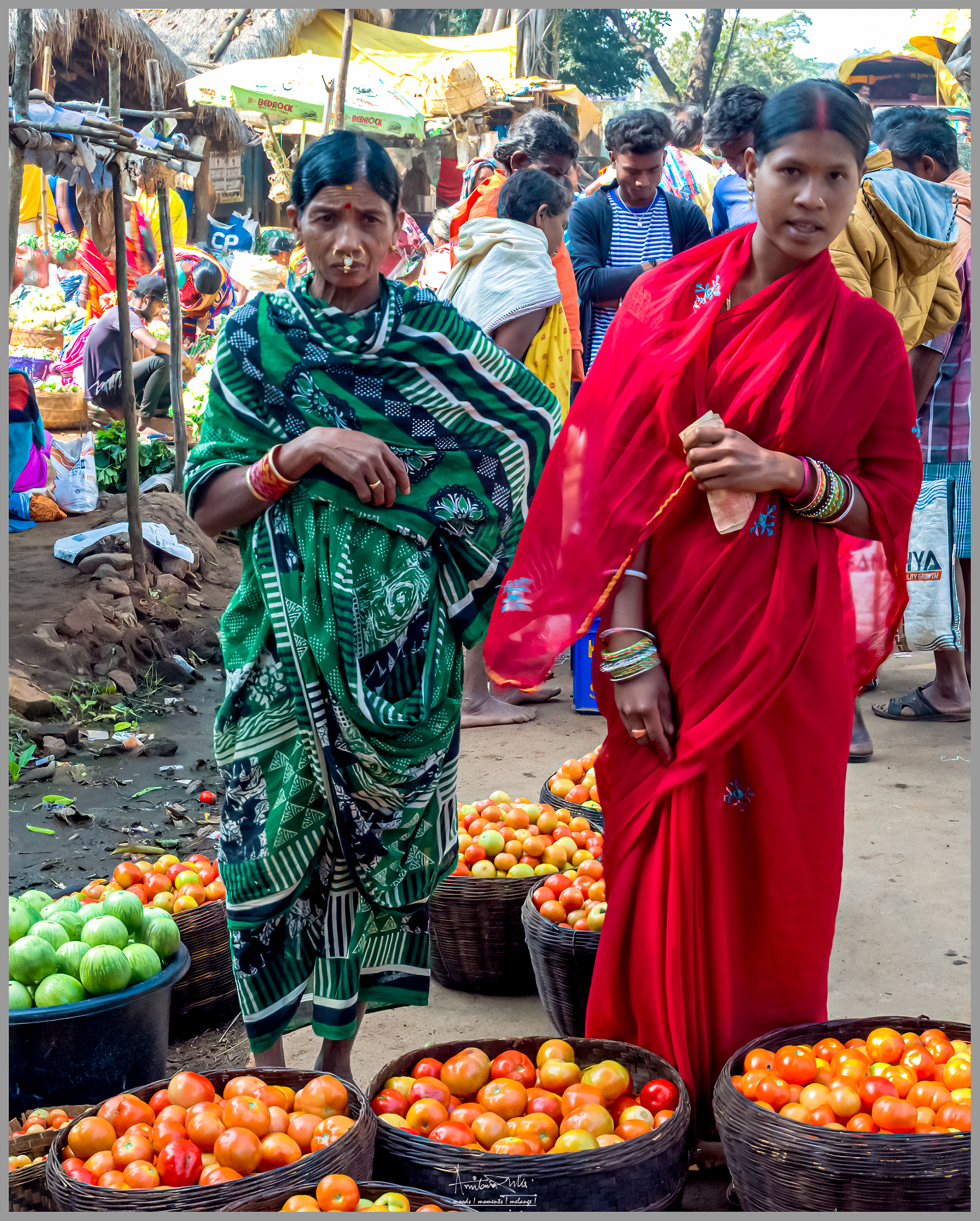
'The Haat' of Doraguda (The weekly village market of Doraguda, Odisha)

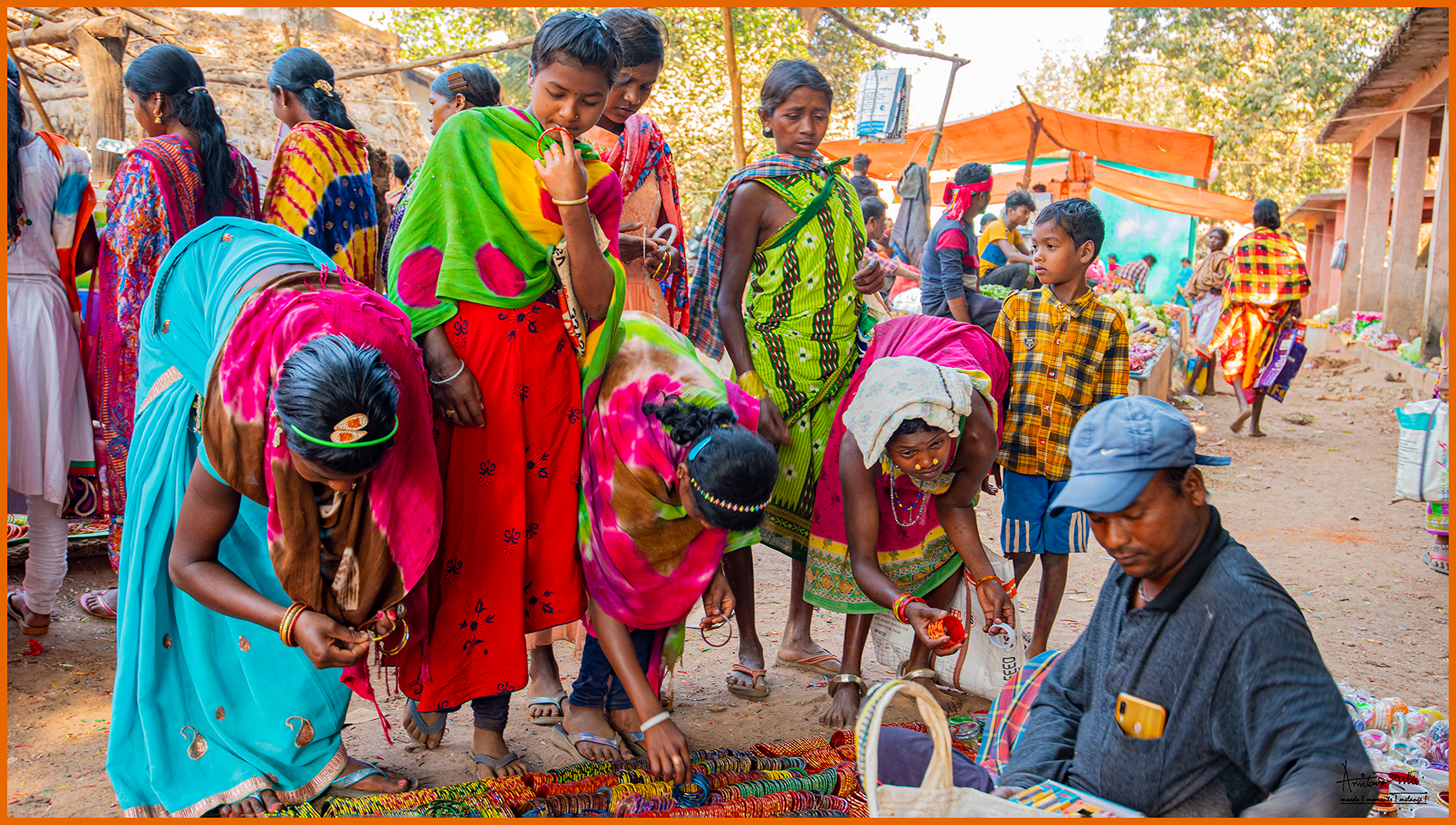
'The Haat' of Doraguda (The weekly village market of Doraguda, Odisha)

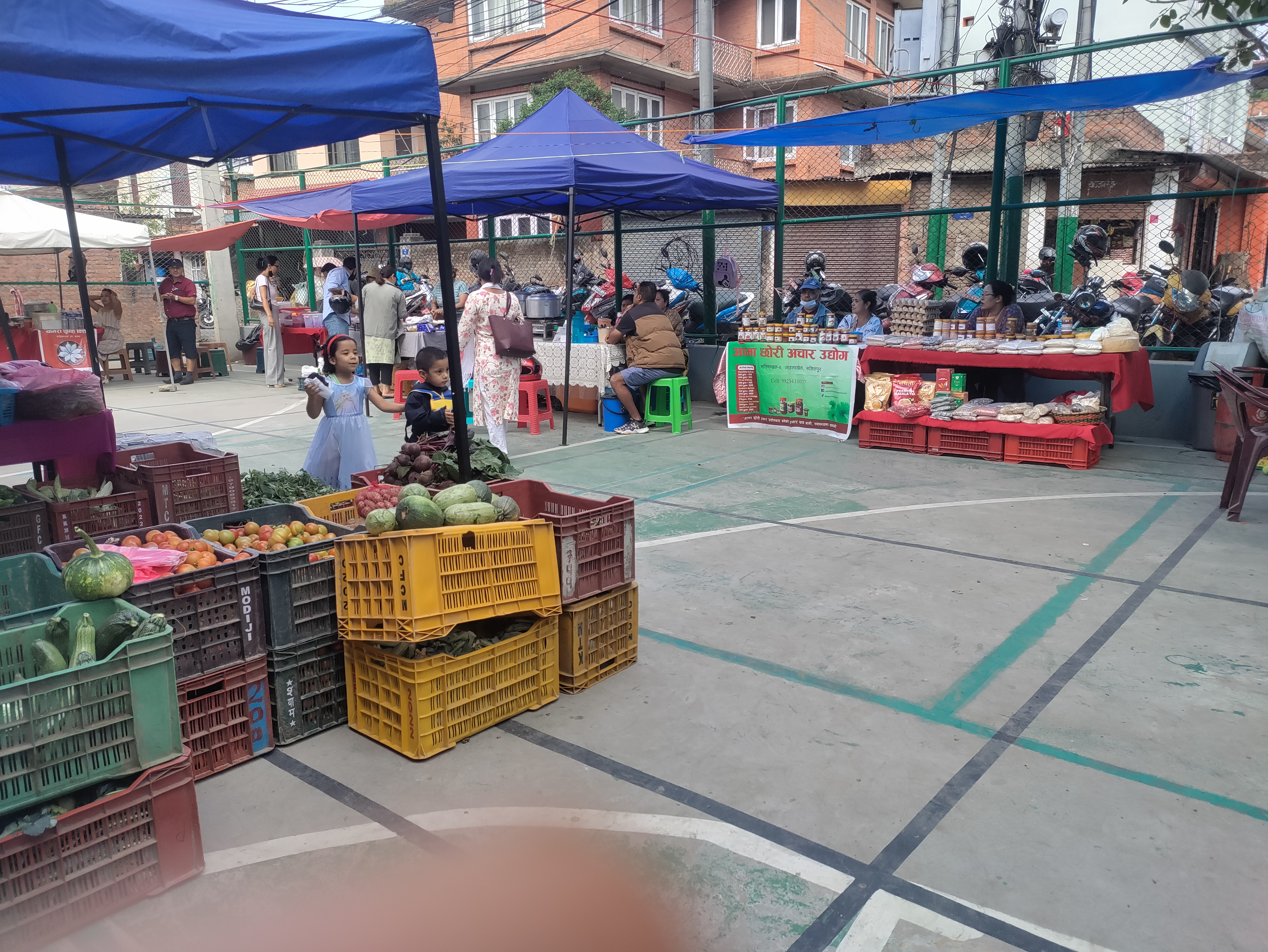
The weekly market of Bhanimandal, Lalitpur.

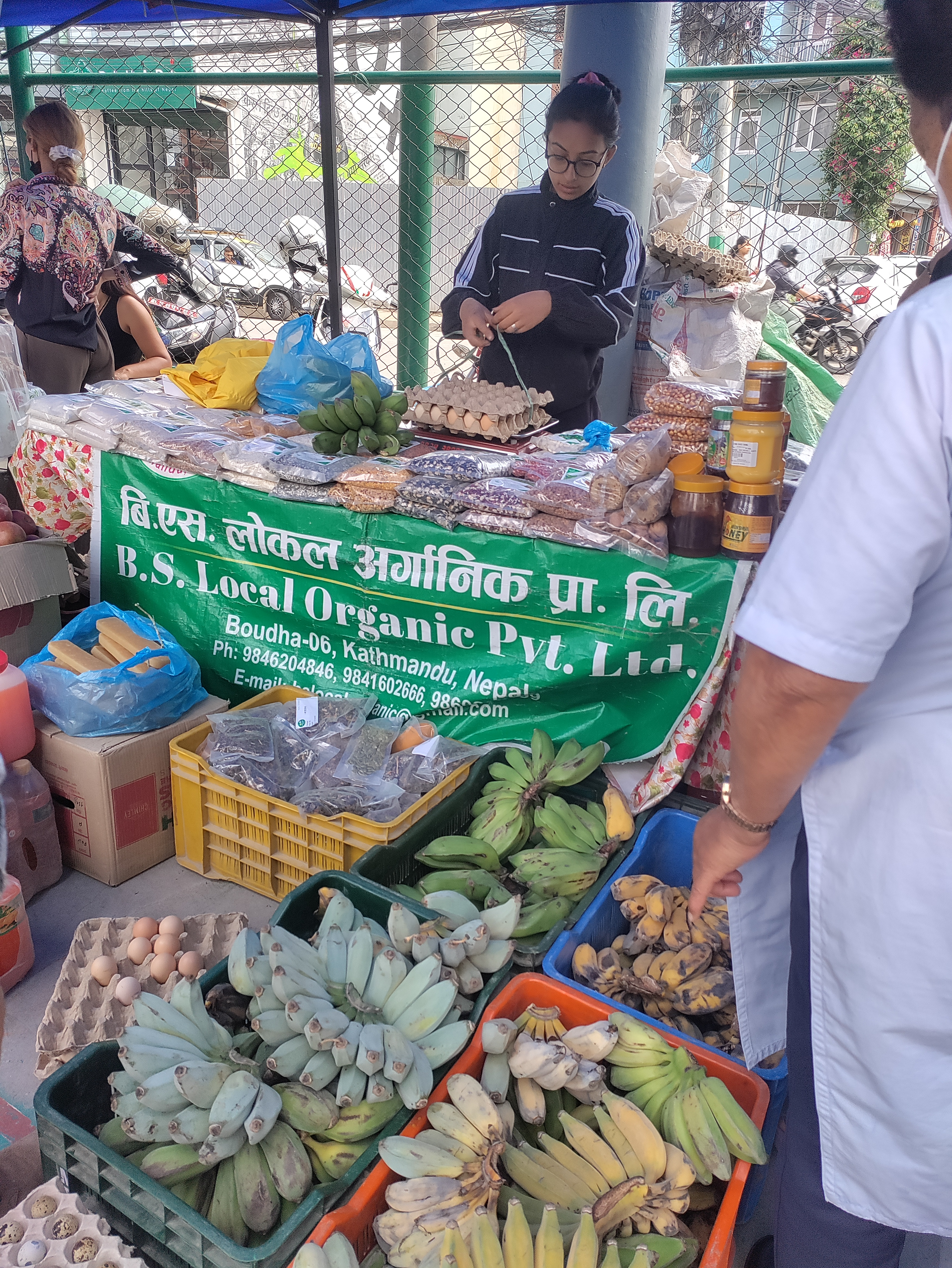
Local products in Haat bazaar, Nepal.

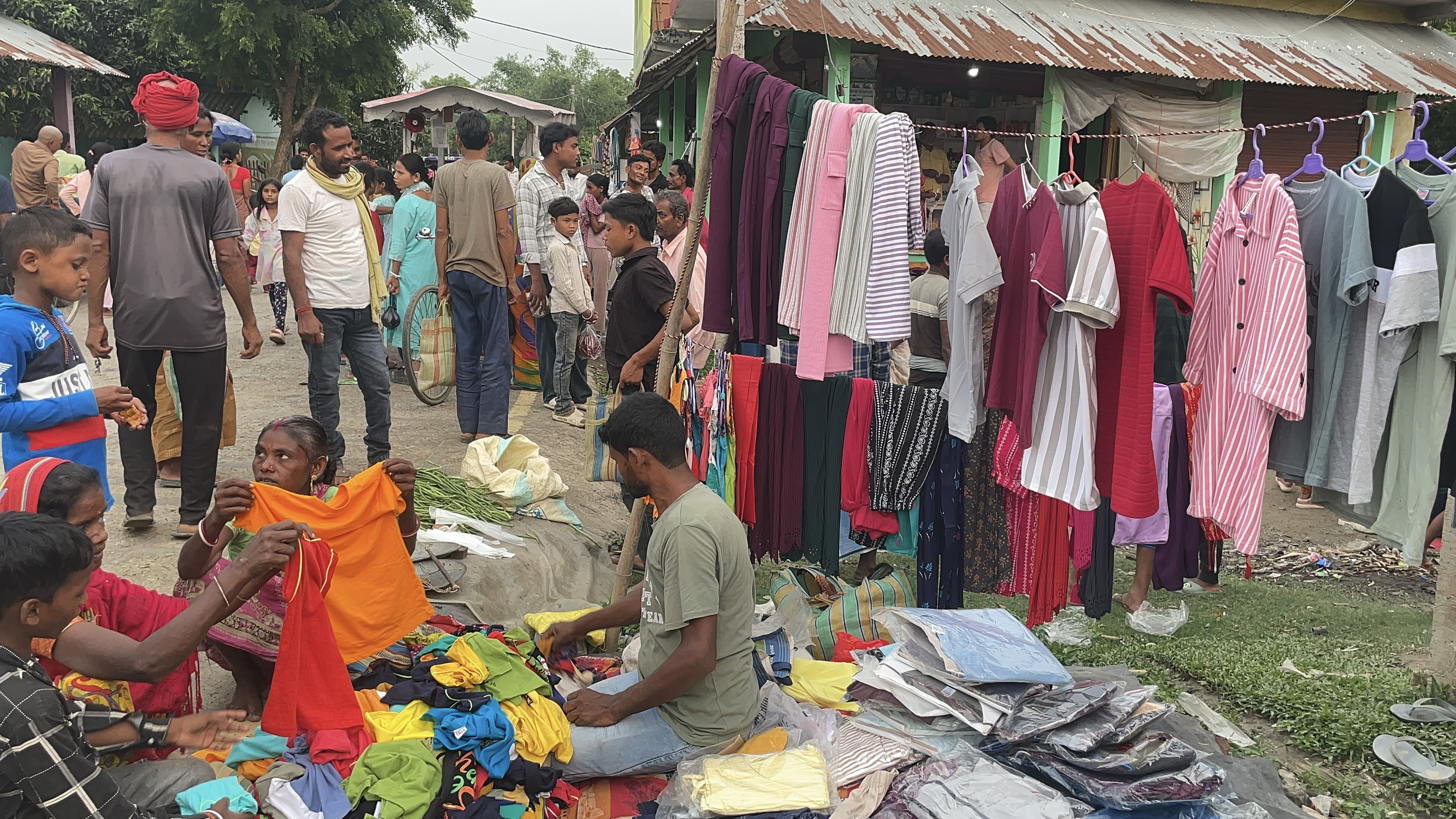
A clothes trader in a Haat bazaar in a Surjapuri speaking village
