= Rasulpur (disambiguation) =

Rasulpur is a village in India.

Rasulpur (also spelled Rasoolpur or Rasool Pur) may refer to:

== India ==
- Rasulpur River, a river of West Bengal
- Rasulpur, Amawan, a village in Raebareli district, Uttar Pradesh
- Rasulpur, Bachhrawan, a village in Raebareli district, Uttar Pradesh
- Rasulpur, Bardhaman, a village in Bardhaman district, West Bengal
  - Rasulpur railway station
- Rasulpur Brahmanan, a village in Kapurthala district, Punjab
- Rasulpur Gogumau, a town in Kanpur Dehat district, Uttar Pradesh
- Rasulpur Kalan, a village in Nakodar tehsil, Jalandhar district, Punjab
- Rasulpur Kulian, a village in Kapurthala district, Punjab
- Rasulpur, Nawabganj, a village in Unnao district, Uttar Pradesh
- Rasulpur, Phillaur, a village in Phillaur tehsil, Jalandhar district, Punjab
- Rasulpur, Purwa, a village in Unnao district, Uttar Pradesh
- Rasoolpur, Raibareli, a village in Raebareli district, Uttar Pradesh
- Rasulpur, Rohaniya, a village in Rohaniya block of Raebareli district, Uttar Pradesh, India
- Rasulpur, Sareni, a village in Sareni block of Raebareli district, Uttar Pradesh
- Rasulpur, Zira, a village in Firozpur district, Punjab
- Rasoolpur Abad, a village in Bijnor district, Uttar Pradesh
- Rasoolpur Soor, a village in Balrampur district, Uttar Pradesh
- Jangal Rasoolpur, a village in Gorakhpur, Uttar Pradesh

== Pakistan ==
- Rasulpur, Jhang, a town in Jhang, Punjab
- Rasool Pur, Gujrat
- Rasool Pur, Sindh
- Rasool Pur, Rajanpur

== Bangladesh ==
- Rasulpur Union, a union of Ghatail Upazila, Tangail District

== See also ==
- Rasoolpura metro station, Hyderabad, India
- Rasul (disambiguation)
- Rasulabad, a town in Uttar Pradesh, India
