= Ghulam Rasul =

Ghulam Rasul (Persian: غلام رسول; transliterations vary) is a Muslim masculine given name popular in Afghanistan, Bangladesh and Pakistan. Notable bearers of the name include;

- Ghulam Rasool Gangi, 19th-century Uyghur
- Ghulam Rasul Raja, army officer in British India/Pakistan
- Maulana Ghulam Rasool Mehr (1893–1971), Muslim scholar and political activist in British India/Pakistan
- Ghulam Rasool Kar (1921–2015), Indian politician from Jammu and Kashmir
- Ghulam Rasool Jamaati (born 1923), Pakistani Islamic scholar
- Ghulam Rasool Santosh (1929–1997), Kashmiri Indian painter
- Ghulam Rasool (Telugu journalist) (died 1992), journalist said to have been killed by Andhra Pradesh Police
- Chaudhry Ghulam Rasool (1931–1991), Pakistani educationist and field hockey Olympian
- Kazi Golam Rasul (1942–2014), Bangladeshi judge
- Abdullah Gulam Rasoul (born c. 1973), Afghan held in Guantanamo
- Ghulam Rasool Birhamani (died 2010), murdered Pakistani journalist
- Ghulam Rasul (swimmer) (born 1935), Pakistani Olympic swimmer
- Golam Rasul, Bangladeshi Member of Parliament
- Md. Golam Rosul, Bangladeshi police officer

== See also ==
- Ghulam
