= Gupta Brindaban =

Coordinates: 24°28′57″N 90°14′16″E

Gupta Brindaban is a village in Ghatail Upazila of Tangail district. It is located in Dhalapara Union, 26 km east of Ghatail Upazila Sadar.

== History ==
The village Gupta Brindaban has an ancient tamal tree around which a fair called 'Baruni Mela' is held every year on the 12th of Chaitra or February. Geographically, Ghatail region has more forest cover. According to the belief of the Hindus, Krishna and Radha used to spend time under a tamal tree in this place which was once surrounded by dense forest. From that the area was named Gupta Brindaban.

There is a temple in the adjoining area where several ancient idols have also been recovered. Several Gupta specimens have been recovered from the area. Many locals think that the former name of this region is Vrindavan. It was renamed Gupta Vrindavan in 156 AD as a result of the discovery of Gupta dynasty specimens.
