= Deulabari Union =

Deulabari Union দেউলাবাড়ী ইউনিয়ন
- Location of Deulabari Union in Bangladesh
- Coordinates: 24.5363486°N 89.98347759°E
- Country: Bangladesh
- Division: Dhaka Division
- District: Tangail District
- Upazila: Ghatail Upazila
- Established on: 1984

Government
  - Type: Union Council
  - Chairman: Rafiqul Islam Khan (Bangladesh Nationalist Party)

Area
  - Total: 26 km^{2} (10 sq mi)
- Elevation: 20 m (66 ft)

Population (2011)
  - Total: 34,983
  - Density: 1,300/km^{2} (3,500/sq mi)
- Time zone: UTC+6 (BST)
- Postal code: 1982
- Website: Official Website of Deulabari Union

Deulabari Union (Bengali: দেউলাবাড়ী ইউনিয়ন) is a union of Ghatail Upazila, Tangail District, Bangladesh. It is situated 10 km north of Ghatail and 44 km north of Tangail, the District Headquarter.

== Demographics ==
According to Population Census 2011 performed by Bangladesh Bureau of Statistics, the total population of Deulabari union is 34983. There are 8869 households in total.

== Education ==
The literacy rate of Deulabari Union is 46.6% (Male-48.8%, Female-44.5%). Notable educational includes Pakutia Public School and College.

== See also ==
- Union Councils of Tangail District
