= Lokerpara Union =

Lokerpara Union লোকেরপাড়া ইউনিয়ন
- Location of Lokerpara Union in Bangladesh
- Coordinates: 24.47562°N 89.88215°E
- Country: Bangladesh
- Division: Dhaka Division
- District: Tangail District
- Upazila: Ghatail Upazila
- Established: 1984

Government
  - Type: Union Council
  - Chairman: Md. Sharif Hossain (Bangladesh Awami League)

Area
  - Total: 18.44 km^{2} (7.12 sq mi)
- Elevation: 17 m (56 ft)

Population (2011)
  - Total: 23,832
  - Density: 1,292/km^{2} (3,347/sq mi)
- Time zone: UTC+6 (BST)
- Postal code: 1981
- Website: lokerparaup.tangail.gov.bd

Lokerpara Union (Bengali: লোকেরপাড়া ইউনিয়ন) is a union of Ghatail Upazila, Tangail District, Bangladesh. It is situated 5 kilometres (3.1 mi) northeast of Bhuapur, 8 kilometres (5.0 mi) west of Ghatail and 33 kilometres (21 mi) north of Tangail, the district headquarters.

== Demographics ==
According to the 2011 Bangladesh census, Lokerpara Union had 6,006 households and a population of 23,832. The literacy rate (age 7 and over) was 45.2% (male: 47.6%, female: 42.9%).

== See also ==
- Union Councils of Tangail District
