= Digar Union =

Digar Union দিগড় ইউনিয়ন
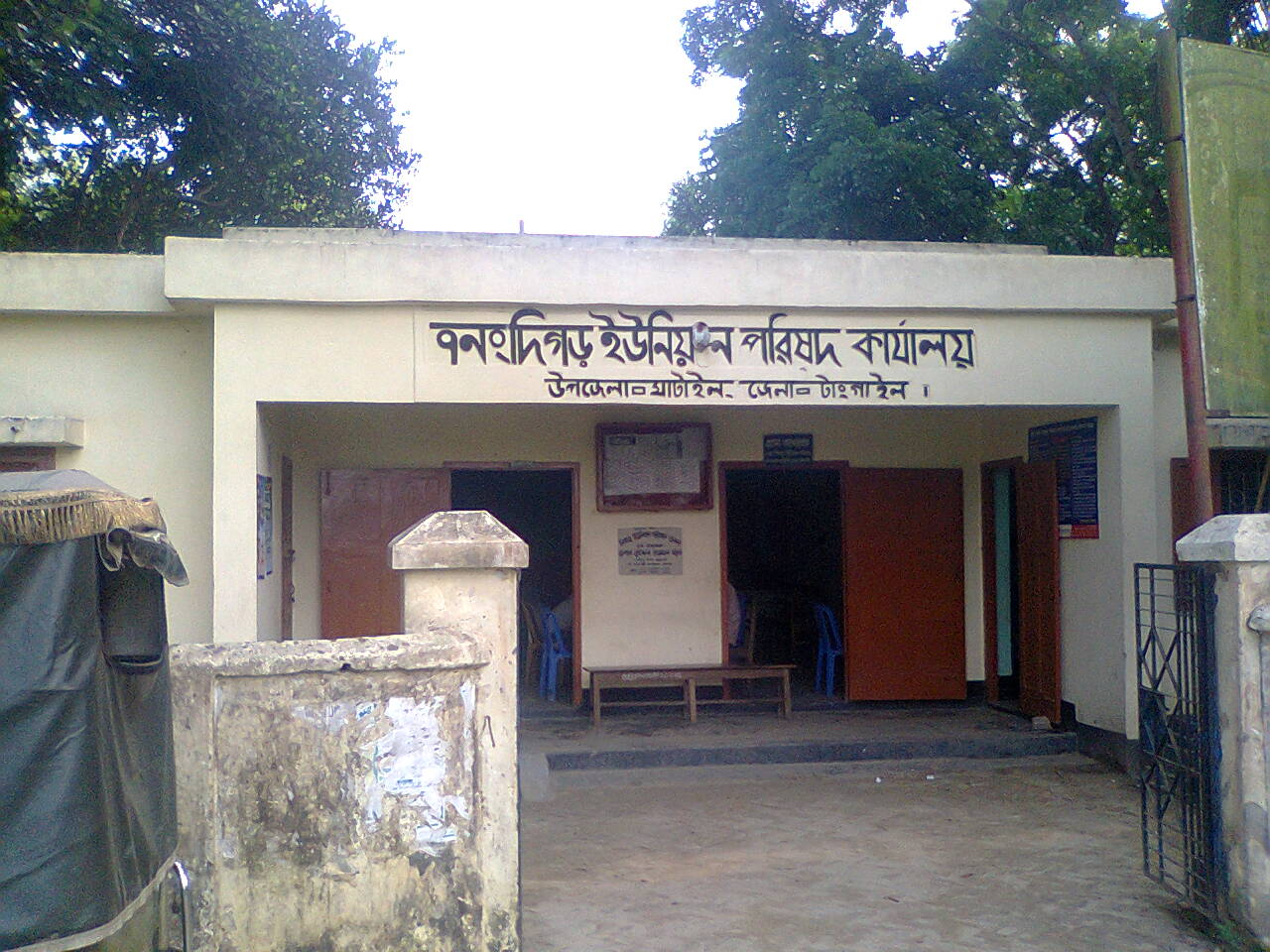
- Digar Union Parishad Complex

- Location of Digar Union in Bangladesh
- Coordinates: 24.45125°N 90.02704°E
- Country: Bangladesh
- Division: Dhaka Division
- District: Tangail District
- Upazila: Ghatail Upazila
- Established on: 1984

Government
  - Type: Union Council
  - Chairman: Faruk Hossan Foni (Bangladesh Awamileague)

Area
  - Total: 26.75 km^{2} (10.33 sq mi)
- Elevation: 16 m (52 ft)

Population (2011)
  - Total: 37,928
  - Density: 1,418/km^{2} (3,672/sq mi)
- Time zone: UTC+6 (BST)
- Postal code: 1981
- Website: Official Website of Digar Union

Digar Union (Bengali: দিগড় ইউনিয়ন) is a union of Ghatail Upazila, Tangail District, Bangladesh. It is situated 6 km south of Ghatail and 25 km north of Tangail, The District Headquarter.

== Demographics ==
According to Population Census 2011 performed by Bangladesh Bureau of Statistics, The total population of Digar union is 37928. There are households 9594 in total.

== Education ==
The literacy rate of Digar Union is 43.2% (Male-46.8%, Female-40%).

== See also ==
- Union Councils of Tangail District
