= Nikrail Union =

Nikrail Union নিকরাইল ইউনিয়ন
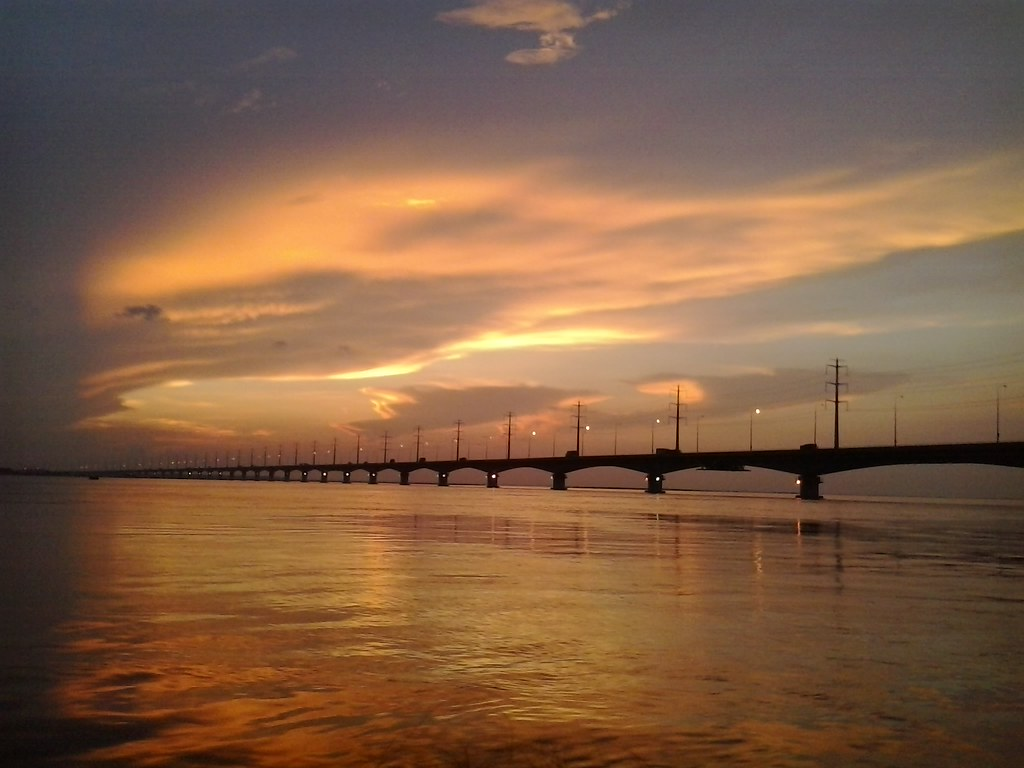
- Bangabandhu Bridge Capture by Tanjil Sarkar, Bangladesh

- Location of Nikrail in Bangladesh
- Coordinates: 24.40289277°N 89.84182209°E
- Country: Bangladesh
- Division: Dhaka Division
- District: Tangail District
- Upazila: Bhuapur Upazila
- Established on: 1984

Government
  - Type: Union Council
  - Chairman: Masudul Haq Masud
  - President, Bangladesh Awami League, Nikrail Union, Bhuapur: Mohammad Abdul Matin Sarkar

Area
  - Total: 41.55 km^{2} (16.04 sq mi)
- Elevation: 17 m (56 ft)

Population (2011)
  - Total: 25,813
  - Density: 621.3/km^{2} (1,609/sq mi)
- Time zone: UTC+6 (BST)
- Postal code: 1976
- Website: http://nikrailup.tangail.gov.bd/

Nikrail Union (Bengali: নিকরাইল ইউনিয়ন) is a union of Bhuapur Upazila, Tangail District, Bangladesh. It is situated 33 km north of Tangail.

== Demographics ==
According to Population Census 2011 performed by Bangladesh Bureau of Statistics, The total population of Nikrail union is 25813. There are 5909 households in total.

== Education ==
The literacy rate of Nikrail Union is 42.3% (Male-46.5%, Female-37.8%).

== See also ==
- Union Councils of Tangail District
