= Sandhanpur Union =

Sandhanpur Union সন্ধানপুর ইউনিয়ন
- Location of Sandhanpur Union in Bangladesh
- Coordinates: 24.508034°N 90.049143°E
- Country: Bangladesh
- Division: Dhaka Division
- District: Tangail District
- Upazila: Ghatail Upazila
- Established on: 1984

Government
  - Type: Union Council

Area
  - Total: 73.78 km^{2} (28.49 sq mi)
- Elevation: 26 m (85 ft)

Population (2011)
  - Total: 47,055
  - Density: 637.8/km^{2} (1,652/sq mi)
- Time zone: UTC+6 (BST)
- Postal code: 1983
- Website: sandhanpurup.tangail.gov.bd

Sandhanpur Union (Bengali: সন্ধানপুর ইউনিয়ন) is a union of Ghatail Upazila, Tangail District, Bangladesh. It is situated 10 km east of Ghatail and 54 km northeast of Tangail in the middle of Madhupur tract.

== Demographics ==
According to Population Census 2011 performed by Bangladesh Bureau of Statistics, The total population of Sandhanpur union is 47055. There are households 12508 in total.

== Education ==
The literacy rate of Sandhanpur Union is 39.6% (Male-41.6%, Female-37.7%).

== See also ==
- Union Councils of Tangail District
