= Digalkandi Union =

Dighalkandi Union দিঘলকান্দি ইউনিয়ন
- Location of Digalkandi Union in Bangladesh
- Coordinates: 24.421010°N 89.984851°E
- Country: Bangladesh
- Division: Dhaka Division
- District: Tangail District
- Upazila: Ghatail Upazila
- Established on: 1984

Government
  - Type: Union Council
  - Chairman: Nazrul Islam (Bangladesh Nationalist Party)

Area
  - Total: 26.75 km^{2} (10.33 sq mi)
- Elevation: 16 m (52 ft)

Population (2011)
  - Total: 29,829
  - Density: 1,115/km^{2} (2,888/sq mi)
- Time zone: UTC+6 (BST)
- Postal code: 1981
- Website: Official Website of Digalkandi Union

Digalkandi Union (Bengali: দিগলকান্দি ইউনিয়ন) is a union of Ghatail Upazila, Tangail District, Bangladesh. It is situated 8 km south of Ghatail and 27 km north of Tangail, The District Headquarter.

== Demographics ==
According to Population Census 2011 performed by Bangladesh Bureau of Statistics, The total population of Digalkandi union is 29829. There are households 7649 in total.

== Education ==
The literacy rate of Digalkandi Union is 48.2% (Male-50.8%, Female-45.9%).

== See also ==
- Union Councils of Tangail District
