= Deopara Union =

Deopara Union দেওপাড়া ইউনিয়ন
- Location of Deopara Union in Bangladesh
- Coordinates: 24.41456292°N 90.06312847°E
- Country: Bangladesh
- Division: Dhaka Division
- District: Tangail District
- Upazila: Ghatail Upazila
- Established on: 1984

Government
  - Type: Union Council
  - Chairman: Mayeen Uddin Talukdar (Bangladesh Awami League)

Area
  - Total: 39.2 km^{2} (15.1 sq mi)
- Elevation: 27 m (89 ft)

Population (2011)
  - Total: 23,700
  - Density: 605/km^{2} (1,570/sq mi)
- Time zone: UTC+6 (BST)
- Postal code: 1983
- Website: Official Website of Deopara Union

Deopara Union (Bengali: দেওপাড়া ইউনিয়ন) is a union of Ghatail Upazila, Tangail District, Bangladesh. It is situated 10 km southeast of Ghatail and 31 km northeast of Tangail, The District Headquarter.

== Demographics ==
According to Population Census 2011 performed by Bangladesh Bureau of Statistics, The total population of Deopara union is 23700. There are households 6042 in total.

== Education ==
The literacy rate of Deopara Union is 39.6% (Male-43.8%, Female-35.8%).

== See also ==
- Union Councils of Tangail District
