= Rasul (given name) =

Rasul (also spelled Rasool, Rasoul, or Resul, Arabic: رسول) is the Arabic for "messenger, apostle"; see Apostle (Islam). It is also a masculine given name.

Notable people with the name include:

== Rasoul ==
- Rasoul Amani (born 1964), New Zealand wrestler
- Rasoul Khadem (born 1972), Iranian wrestler
- Rasoul Khatibi (born 1978), Iranian footballer
- Rasoul Korbekandi (born 1953), Iranian footballer
- Rasoul Mirmalek (1938–2024), Iranian wrestler
- Rasoul Mirtoroghi (born 1984), Iranian footballer
- Rasoul Mollagholipour (1955–2007), Iranian film director
- Rasoul Pirzadeh (born 1982), Iranian footballer
- Rasoul Taghian, Iranian weightlifter

== Rasul ==
- Rasul Amin (1939–2009), Afghan politician
- Rasul Douglas (born 1994), American football player
- Rasul Guliyev (born 1947), Azerbaijani politician
- Rasul Jan (born 1952), Pakistani chemist
- Rasul Khan, Indian monarch
- Rasul Mirzaev (born 1986), Dagestani Mixed Martial Artist
- Rasul Rza (1910–1981), Azerbaijani writer

== Resul ==
- Resul Dindar (born 1996), Laz-Turkish singer
- Resul Elvan (born 1989), Turkish Weightlifter
- Resul Kastrati (born 1994), Albanian footballer
- Resul Pookutty (born 1971), Indian sound designer
- Resul Tekeli (born 1986), Turkish volleyball player

== See also ==
- Rasul (surname)
- Rasulov
- Rasul (disambiguation)
- Abdul Rasul (disambiguation), Arabic theophoric name
