= Jamuria Union =

Jamuria Union জামুরিয়া ইউনিয়ন
- Location of Jamuria Union in Bangladesh
- Coordinates: 24.471446°N 89.954557°E
- Country: Bangladesh
- Division: Dhaka Division
- District: Tangail District
- Upazila: Ghatail Upazila
- Established: 1984

Government
  - Type: Union Council
  - Chairman: Iklakh Hossain Khan Shamim (Bangladesh Nationalist Party)

Area
  - Total: 26.87 km^{2} (10.37 sq mi)
- Elevation: 16 m (52 ft)

Population (2011)
  - Total: 29,556
  - Density: 1,100/km^{2} (2,849/sq mi)
- Time zone: UTC+6 (BST)
- Postal code: 1980
- Website: jamuriaup.tangail.gov.bd

Jamuria Union (Bengali: জামুরিয়া ইউনিয়ন) is a union of Ghatail Upazila, Tangail District, Bangladesh. It is situated 3 kilometres (1.9 mi) west of Ghatail and 35 kilometres (22 mi) north of Tangail, the district headquarters.

== Demographics ==
According to the 2011 Bangladesh census, Jamuria Union had 7,463 households and a population of 29,556. The literacy rate (age 7 and over) was 50.4% (male: 53.7%, female: 47.3%).

== See also ==
- Union Councils of Tangail District
