= Anehola Union =

Anehola Union আনেহলা ইউনিয়ন
- Location of Anehola Union in Bangladesh
- Coordinates: 24.42104966°N 89.91249561°E
- Country: Bangladesh
- Division: Dhaka Division
- District: Tangail District
- Upazila: Ghatail Upazila
- Established on: 1984

Government
  - Type: Union Council
  - Chairman: Shahjahan Talukdar (Bangladesh Awami League)

Area
  - Total: 23.06 km^{2} (8.90 sq mi)
- Elevation: 17 m (56 ft)

Population (2011)
  - Total: 25,665
  - Density: 1,113/km^{2} (2,883/sq mi)
- Time zone: UTC+6 (BST)
- Postal code: 1980
- Website: Official Website of Anehola Union

Anehola Union (Bengali: আনেহলা ইউনিয়ন) is a union of Ghatail Upazila, Tangail District, Bangladesh. It is situated 10 km southwest of Ghatail and 24 km north of Tangail, The District Headquarter.

== Demographics ==
According to Population Census 2011 performed by Bangladesh Bureau of Statistics, The total population of Anehola union is 25665. There are households 6524 in total.

== Education ==
The literacy rate of Anehola Union is 45% (Male-47.3%, Female-42.9%).

== See also ==
- Union Councils of Tangail District
