= Rasul =

Rasul may refer to:

- Rasūl, an Islamic messenger or prophet
- Rasul (given name)
- Rasul (surname)
- Rasul, Punjab, a Union Council of Mandi Bahauddin District in Pakistan
- "Rasul", a song by Spyro Gyra from Morning Dance
- Rasulid dynasty, ruled Yemen in 13th–14th centuries
- Rasulid Hexaglot, a six language dictionary produced during the dynasty's rule
- Rasul ibn Ali, father of Somali nationalism and Ajuran sultan

== See also ==
- Rasulpur (disambiguation)
- Rasul v. Bush, a 2004 landmark United States Supreme Court decision
- Rhassoul, a natural mineral clay used in bodily cleansing
