= Rasulov =

Rasulov (Uzbek: Rasulov, Russian: Расулов, Azerbaijani: Rəsulov, Tajik: Расулов, Kazakh: Расулов) is an Azeri and Central Asian surname. Its female form is Rasulova. It is a slavicised version of Rasul with addition of the suffix -ov. Notable people with the surname include:

- Abdukhamidullo Rasulov (1961), Uzbek football assistant referee
- Dzhabar Rasulov (1913–1982), Soviet diplomat
- Elcan Rasulov (1987), Azerbaijani actor, TV presenter, showman
- Elhan Rasulov (1960), former Soviet and Azerbaijani footballer
- Elshod Rasulov (1986), Uzbek boxer
- Lidiya Khudat Rasulova (1941–2012), Azerbaijani politician
- Luiza Rasulova (born 1995), Uzbek actress and presenter
- Majid Rasulov (1916–1993), Azerbaijani scientist and academician
- Muharram Rasulova (1926–2006), Tajikistani botanist
- Oksana Rasulova (born 1982), Azerbaijani dancer, choreographer and actress
- Vugar Rasulov (1991), Azerbaijani chess Grandmaster
