= Gobindashi Union =

Gobindashi Union গোবিন্দাসী ইউনিয়ন
- Location of Gobindashi in Bangladesh
- Coordinates: 24.44963036°N 89.82669711°E
- Country: Bangladesh
- Division: Dhaka Division
- District: Tangail District
- Upazila: Bhuapur Upazila
- Established on: 1984

Government
  - Type: Union Council
  - Chairman: Dulal Chakder (Bangladesh Awami League)
  - Former chairman(till 2018): Aminul Islam (Bangladesh Awami League)
  - Former charman(till 2013): Iqram uddin Tara Mridha (Bangladesh Awami League)
  - Former Chairman (2018-2022): Mostafizur Rahman Bablu

Area
  - Total: 17.6 km^{2} (6.8 sq mi)
- Elevation: 19 m (62 ft)

Population (2011)
  - Total: 33,439
  - Density: 1,900/km^{2} (4,920/sq mi)
- Time zone: UTC+6 (BST)
- Postal code: 1960
- Website: gobindashiup.tangail.gov.bd

Gobindashi Union (Bengali: গোবিন্দাসী ইউনিয়ন) is a union of Bhuapur Upazila, Tangail District, Bangladesh. It is situated 35 km north of Tangail.It is situated on the bank of Jamuna River.There are several primary schools, high schools and kindergartens. There is a famous big cattle market in Gobindashi named "Gobindashi Cattle Market". The earnings of the citizen of this union largely depends on agriculture, business, govt. jobs etc. Dulal Hossain Chakder is the current leader (Chairman) of Gobindashi.

== Demographics ==
According to the 2011 Bangladesh census, Gobindashi Union had 8,109 households and a population of 33,439.

The literacy rate (age 7 and over) was 46.4% (Male-49.3%, Female-43.6%).

== See also ==
- Union Councils of Tangail District

== Famous Educational Institute ==
- Gobindashi High School
- Ruhuly High School
- Gobindashi Govt. Primary School
- Kukadair Govt. Primary School

== Geography ==
=== Climate ===
Gobindashi has a tropical climate with significantly less rainfall in winter than in summer. According to Köppen and Geiger, this climate is classified as Aw. The average temperature here is 25.5 °C.

=== River system ===
Gobindashi is flanked on the west by the Jamuna River, which is over 7 kilometres wide during the rainy season.
