= Falda Union =

Falda Union ফলদা ইউনিয়ন
- Location of Falda in Bangladesh
- Coordinates: 24.51815464°N 89.84915257°E
- Country: Bangladesh
- Division: Dhaka Division
- District: Tangail District
- Upazila: Bhuapur Upazila
- Established on: 1984

Government
  - Type: Union Council
  - Chairman: Sayeedul Islam Talukdar Dudu (Bangladesh Awami League)

Area
  - Total: 19.39 km^{2} (7.49 sq mi)
- Elevation: 19 m (62 ft)

Population (2011)
  - Total: 21,497
  - Density: 1,109/km^{2} (2,871/sq mi)
- Time zone: UTC+6 (BST)
- Postal code: 1960
- Website: http://faldaup.tangail.gov.bd/

Falda Union (Bengali: ফলদা ইউনিয়ন) is a union of Bhuapur Upazila, Tangail District, Bangladesh. It is situated 34 km north of Tangail.

== Demographics ==
According to the Population Census 2012 performed by Bangladesh Bureau of Statistics, the total population of Falda Union is 21,497. There are 5,728 households in total.

== Education ==
The literacy rate of Falda Union is 46.1% (Male-49.3%, Female-43.2%).

== See also ==
- Union Councils of Tangail District
