= Rasulpur Union =

Rasulpur Union রসুলপুর ইউনিয়ন
- Location of Rasulpur Union in Bangladesh
- Coordinates: 24.505560°N 90.095813°E
- Country: Bangladesh
- Division: Dhaka Division
- District: Tangail District
- Upazila: Ghatail Upazila
- Established: 1984

Government
  - Type: Union Council

Area
  - Total: 90.27 km^{2} (34.85 sq mi)
- Elevation: 26 m (85 ft)

Population (2011)
  - Total: 57,028
  - Density: 631.7/km^{2} (1,636/sq mi)
- Time zone: UTC+6 (BST)
- Postal code: 1983
- Website: Official Website of Rasulpur Union

Rasulpur Union (Bengali: রসুলপুর ইউনিয়ন) is a union of Ghatail Upazila, Tangail District, Bangladesh. It is situated 12 km east of Ghatail and 52 km northeast of Tangail in the middle of Madhupur tract.

== Demographics ==
According to the 2011 Bangladesh census performed by the Bangladesh Bureau of Statistics, the total population of Rasulpur union is 57,028. There are 14,654 households in total.

== Education ==
The literacy rate of Rasulpur Union is 39.6% (Male-41.6%, Female-37.7%).

== See also ==
- Union Councils of Tangail District
