= Rasulpur, Bardhaman =

Rasulpur
- Village
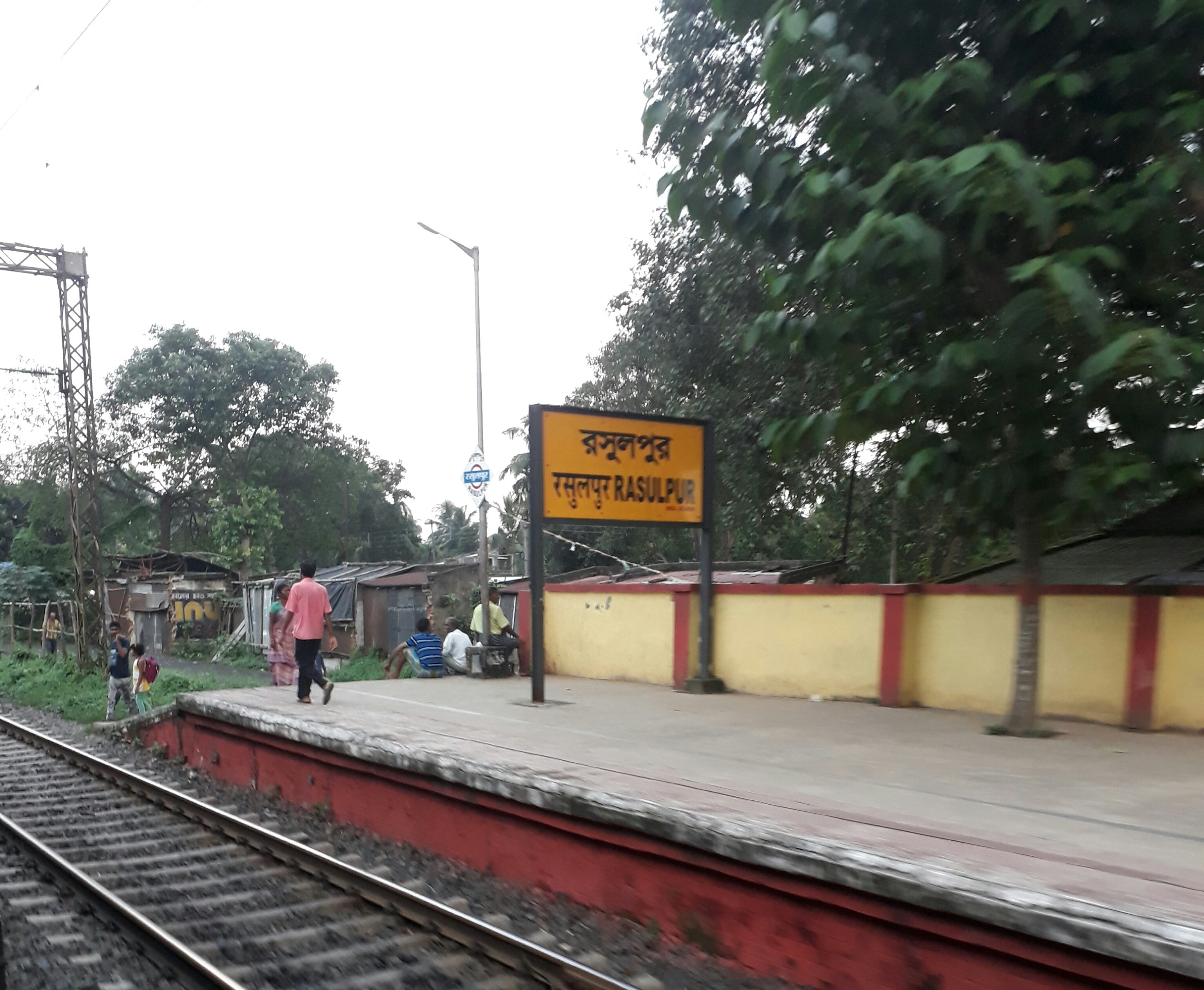
- Rasulpur railway station

- Location in West Bengal, India Rasulpur (India)
- Coordinates: 23.18513°N 88.02976°E
- Country: India
- State: West Bengal
- District: Purba Bardhaman

Population (2011)
  - Total: 5,091

Languages
  - Official: Bengali, English
- Time zone: UTC+5:30 (IST)
- Telephone/STD code: 03213
- Lok Sabha constituency: Bardhaman Purba
- Vidhan Sabha constituency: Memari
- Website: purbabardhaman.gov.in

Rasulpur is a village of Memari I CD block in Bardhaman Sadar South subdivision of Purba Bardhaman district in the state of West Bengal, India.

== Geography ==
Cities and towns in the Bardhaman Sadar South subdivision of Purba Bardhaman district
M: municipal city/ town, CT: census town, R: rural/ urban centre.
Owing to space constraints in the small map, the actual locations in a larger map may vary slightly

=== Location ===
23.18513°N 88.02976°E

=== Urbanisation ===
95.54% of the population of Bardhaman Sadar South subdivision live in the rural areas. Only 4.46% of the population live in the urban areas, and that is the lowest proportion of urban population amongst the four subdivisions in Purba Bardhaman district. The map alongside presents some of the notable locations in the subdivision. All places marked in the map are linked in the larger full screen map.

== Demographics ==
As per the 2011 Census of India Rasulpur had a total population of 5,091, of which 2,550 (50%) were males and 2,541 (50%) were females. Population below 6 years was 423. The total number of literates in Rasulpur was 3,930 (84.19% of the population over 6 years).

== Transport ==
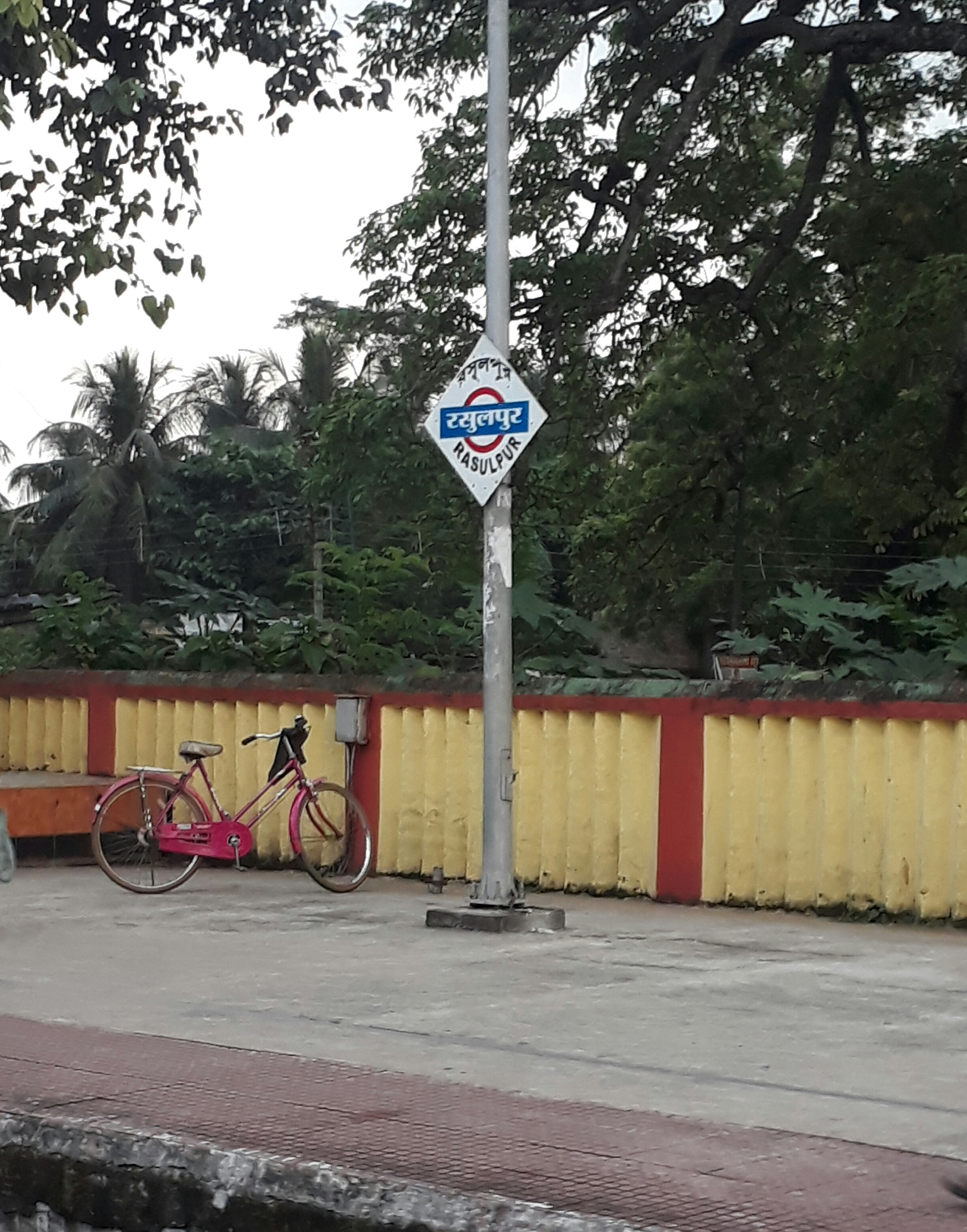
Rasulpur station

- Rasulpur railway station is situated on the Howrah-Bardhaman main line.
- Kolkata-Agra National Highway 19 (old numbering NH 2) passes near Rasulpur.
- State Highway 13 running from Palsit (in Bardhaman district) to Dankuni (in Hooghly district), incorporating old GT Road in the area, passes through Rasulpur and meets NH 19 at Palsit, near Rasulpur.

== Education ==
Rasulpur Bhuban Mohon High School, established in 1876 at Nimo, is a Bengali-medium boys only, higher secondary school.

Baidyadanga Girls High School, established in 1949, is a Bengali-medium girls only, higher secondary school.
