= Palsit railway station =

Railway station in West Bengal, India

Palsit
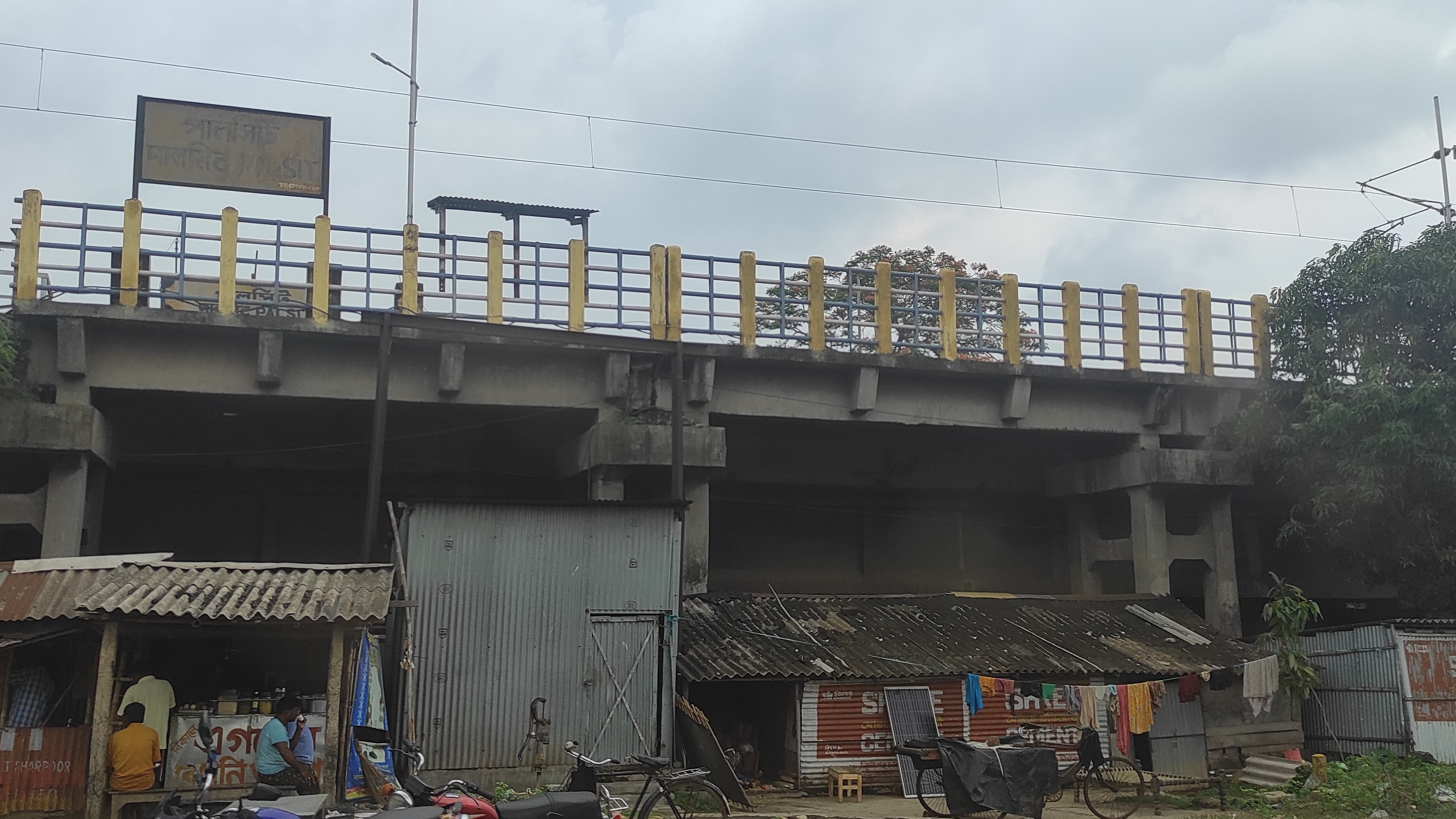
- Palsit railway station in 2022

General information
- Location: Palla Road, National Highway 2, Palsit, Purba Bardhaman district, West Bengal; India
- Coordinates: 23°11′48″N 88°00′11″E
- Elevation: 28 metres (92 ft)
- System: Kolkata Suburban Railway
- Owner: Indian Railways
- Operator: Eastern Railway
- Line: Howrah–Bardhaman main line
- Platforms: 2
- Tracks: 2

Construction
- Structure type: Standard (on ground station)
- Parking: No

Other information
- Status: Functioning
- Station code: PLAE
- Division(s): Howrah

History
- Opened: 1855
- Electrified: 1958
- Former names: East Indian Railway Company

Services
Preceding station	Kolkata Suburban Railway	Following station
Rasulpur towards Howrah Junction	Eastern Line Howrah–Bardhaman main line	Saktigarh towards Barddhaman Junction
Route map
Location
- Location within West Bengal Location within India

Palsit railway station is a Kolkata Suburban Railway station on the Howrah–Bardhaman main line operated by Eastern Railway zone of Indian Railways. It is situated beside Palla Road, National Highway 2, at Sekhpur, Palsit, Purba Bardhaman district in the Indian state of West Bengal.

== History ==
The East Indian Railway Company was formed on 1 June 1845, The first passenger train in the eastern section was operated up to Hooghly, on 15 August 1854. On 1 February 1855 the first train ran from Howrah to Raniganj through Howrah–Bardhaman main line. Bandel to Bardhaman route was opened for traffic on 1 January 1885. Electrification of the Howrah–Bardhaman main line was initiated up to Bandel in 1957, with the 3000V DC system, and the entire Howrah–Bardhaman route including Palsit railway station completed with AC system, along with conversion of earlier DC portions to 25 kV AC, in 1958.
