= Palsit =

- Village
- Location in West Bengal, India Palsit (India)
- Coordinates: 23.186359°N 88.015997°E
- Country: India
- State: West Bengal
- District: Purba Bardhaman
- Elevation: 23 m (75 ft)

Population (2011)
  - Total: 3,578

Languages
  - Official: Bengali, English
- Time zone: UTC+5:30 (IST)
- PIN: 713149
- Vehicle registration: WB
- Website: purbabardhaman.gov.in

Palsit is a village in Burdwan II CD block in Bardhaman Sadar North subdivision of Purba Bardhaman district in the Indian state of West Bengal. It's having many other small villages in palsit.

It is believed that Swami Vivekananda has walked through the palsit village. There are two madan Gopal Mandir is situated here in this area, one at palsit and another one is at Bhaita. Palsit hattala (Also known as bakultata and shibtala) is the center of attraction of this area.

== Geography ==
Cities and towns in the Bardhaman Sadar North subdivision of Purba Bardhaman district
M: municipal city/ town, CT: census town, R: rural/ urban centre, H: historical site, W: river project, C: craft centre
Owing to space constraints in the small map, the actual locations in a larger map may vary slightly

=== Location ===
Palsit is located at 23°11′11″N 88°00′58″E

Palsit is part of the Bardhaman Plain, the central plain area of the district. The area is surrounded by the Bhagirathi on the east, the Ajay on the north-west and the Damodar on the west and south. Old river channels and small creeks found in the region dry up in the dry season, but the Bardhaman Plains are sometimes subject to heavy floods during the rainy season. The region has recent alluvial soils. In this region cultivation is through the year. Some places with rain water, river water and tubes wells.

=== Urbanisation ===
73.58% of the population of Bardhaman Sadar North subdivision lives in the rural areas. Only 26.42% of the population lives in the urban areas, and that is the highest proportion of urban population amongst the four subdivisions in Purba Bardhaman district. The map alongside presents some of the notable locations in the subdivision. All places marked in the map are linked in the larger full screen map.

== Demographics ==
As per the 2011 Census of India Palsit had a total population of 3,578, of which 1,790 (50%) were males and 1,788 (50%) were females. Population below 6 years was 370. The total number of literates in Palsit was 2,307 (71.91% of the population over 6 years).

== Transport ==
Palsit is the junction point of the Grand Trunk Road and Durgapur Expressway. It is on NH 19. While Dankuni is 65 kilometres (40 mi), Panagarh is 64 kilometres (40 mi) from Palsit.

Palsit is the meeting point of NH 114 and SH 13.

Palsit railway station is situated on the Howrah-Bardhaman Main Line, 92 kilometres (57 mi) from Howrah Station. It is 4 kilometres (2.5 mi) each from Saktigarh and Rasulpur. It is part of Kolkata Suburban Railway system.
