= Rasul (surname) =

Rasul (also spelled Rasool, Rasoul, or Resul, Arabic: رسول) is the Arabic for "messenger, apostle", see Apostle (Islam). As a surname, it may refer to:

- Abdul Rasul (Iraqi scientist), Iraqi nuclear engineer and a nuclear scientist
- Adnan Rasool, Pakistani Domestic cricketer
- Akhtar Rasool, Pakistani field hockey player
- Aleezay Rasul, Pakistani actress and model
- Begum Aizaz Rasul, Indian politician
- Behrouz Sebt Rasoul, independent Iranian filmmaker, screenwriter, editor, photographer, musician
- Ebrahim Rasool, South African politician and diplomat
- Ekram Rasul (died 1948), Indian Freedom fighter
- Fadhil Rassoul (1947–1989), assassinated Kurdish academic at the University of Vienna
- Ghulam Rasul (swimmer), Pakistani former swimmer
- Ghulam Rasool (Telugu journalist)
- Iqra Rasool, Indian cricketer
- Imran Rasul, British Pakistani economist and academic
- Javed Rasool, Pakistani Olympic sailor
- Joher Rassoul, Senegalese footballer
- Kamran Rasool, retired Pakistani civil servant
- Karam Rasul Indian wrestler
- M.A. Rasul, Indian politician
- Mohammed Rasool, Iraqi-Kurdish journalist
- Muhammad Rasool, Pakistani footballer
- Muhammad Rasul, former leader of the High Council of the Islamic Emirate of Afghanistan
- Muhib Rasool, Pakistani volleyball player
- Nasir Rasool, Indian cricketer
- Parvez Rasool, Indian cricketer
- S. Ichtiaque Rasool, former chief scientist for global change at the National Aeronautics and Space Administration
- Sam Rasoul, American politician
- Santanina Rasul, Filipina politician
- Sarfraz Rasool, Pakistani former footballer
- Shafiq Rasul, British citizen who was a detainee held at Guantanamo
- Shafqat Rasool, Pakistani field hockey player
- Zalmai Rassoul, Afghan politician
