= Bhuapur Upazila =

Bhuiyanpur Upazila ভূঞাপুর, ভুয়াপুর
- Upazila
- Bhuanpur Upazila
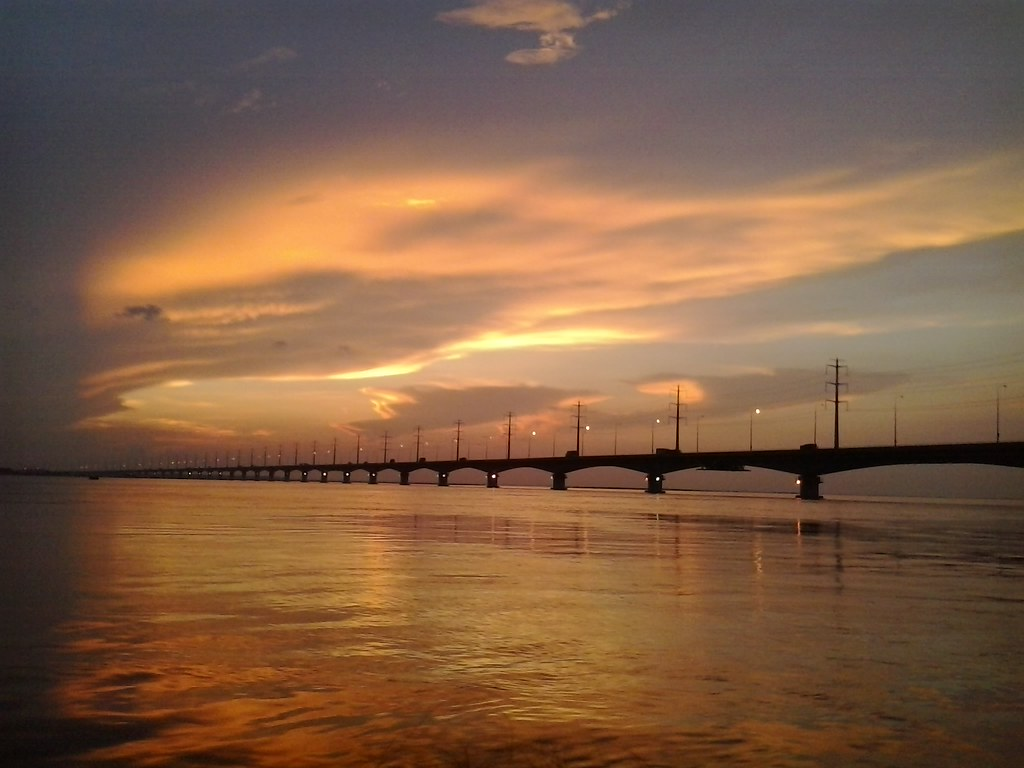
- Bangabandhu Bridge over the Jamuna

- Coordinates: 24°27.5′N 89°52′E
- Country: Bangladesh
- Division: Dhaka
- District: Tangail

Area
  - Total: 225.00 km^{2} (86.87 sq mi)

Population (2022)
  - Total: 217,327
  - Density: 965.90/km^{2} (2,501.7/sq mi)
- Time zone: UTC+6 (BST)
- Postal code: 1960
- Area code: 09223
- Website: bhuapur.tangail.gov.bd

Bhuapur Upazila mauza geocode map

Bhuyanpur (Bengali: ভূঞাপুর) is an upazila of Tangail District in the Division of Dhaka, Bangladesh.

== Geography ==
Bhuapur is located at 24.4583°N 89.8667°E. It has 46,412 households and total area of 225.00 km^{2}. The upazila is surrounded by Gopalpur & Sarishabari Upazila on the north, Kalihati Upazila on the south, Gopalpur and Ghatail Upazila on the east, and the Jamuna River on the west.

== Demographics ==
Religions in Bhuanpur Upazila (2022)
Religion	Percent
Islam	97.08%
Hinduism	2.90%
Other or not stated	0.02%

According to the 2022 Bangladeshi census, Bhuapur Upazila had 56,679 households and a population of 217,327. 9.43% of the population were under 5 years of age. Bhuapur had a literacy rate (age 7 and over) of 70.05%: 72.13% for males and 68.03% for females, and a sex ratio of 97.96 males for every 100 females. 42,422 (19.52%) lived in urban areas.

According to the 2011 Census of Bangladesh, Bhuapur Upazila had 46,412 households and a population of 189,913. 45,885 (24.16%) were under 10 years of age. Bhuapur had a literacy rate (age 7 and over) of 43.84%, compared to the national average of 51.8%, and a sex ratio of 1059 females per 1000 males. 28,708 (15.12%) lived in urban areas.

At the 1991 census Bhuapur had a population of 177,095, of whom 87,854 were aged 18 or older. Males constituted 51.65% of the population, and females 48.35%. Bhuyanpur had an average literacy rate of 29.9% (7+ years), against the national average of 32.4%.

== Administration ==
Bhuapur Upazila is divided into Bhuapur Municipality and six union parishads: Arjuna, Aloa, Falda, Gabsara, Gobindashi, and Nikrail. The union parishads are subdivided into 81 mauzas and 128 villages.

Bhuapur Municipality is subdivided into 9 wards and 22 mahallas.

== Notable residents ==
- Salma Khatun, Bangladesh's first female locomotive driver, graduated from Aurjuna Mohsin High School.
- Afran Nisho

== See also ==
- Bhuapur
- Upazilas of Bangladesh
- Districts of Bangladesh
- Divisions of Bangladesh
