= Mafizuddin Ahmed =

Bangladeshi educationist and scientist (c. 1921–1997)

- Born: 1921; Gangair, Dhalapara Union, Tangail, Bengal Presidency, British India
- Died: 26 September 1997 (aged 75–76); Dhaka, Bangladesh
- Education: University of Dhaka (B.S., M.S.); Pennsylvania State University (Ph.D.)
- Occupations: university academic, administrator, scientist
- Parent: Ahad-Ullah Sarkar

Mafizuddin Ahmed (c. 1921 – 26 September 1997) was a Bangladeshi educationist and scientist. He served as the first vice-chancellor of Jahangirnagar University. He was a founding fellow of the Bangladesh Academy of Sciences.

== Early life and education ==
He was born in Gangair village under Dhalapara Union, Ghatail, Tangail. Ahmed completed his bachelor's and master's in chemistry from the University of Dhaka in 1942 and 1944, respectively. He earned his Ph.D. degree from Pennsylvania State University in 1948.

== Career ==
Ahmed joined the Department of Chemistry of the University of Dhaka in 1948 as a senior lecturer. He was also a member of both the Senate and the Syndicate of the Bangladesh University of Engineering and Technology (BUET).

Ahmed was appointed the first vice-chancellor of Jahangirnagar University and served from 24 September 1970 – 1 February 1972. In 1987, he headed the National Education Commission (popularly called Mafiz Commission after him). He was also appointed chairman of the BCSIR. After the expiry of his term as the chairman of BCSIR, Ahmed returned to the Department of Chemistry. He was appointed an emeritus professor of the Department of Chemistry at Dhaka University in 1988 and continued in this position until his death in 1997.

Ahmed was the founder president of the Bangladesh Chemical Society, established in 1972.

== Awards ==
- Tamgha-e-Pakistan (1966)
- Independence Day Award (1986)
- Bangladesh Chemical Society Gold Medal (1988)
