= Aloa Union =

Aloa Union অলোয়া ইউনিয়ন
- Location of Aloa in Bangladesh
- Coordinates: 24.44371159°N 89.86593246°E
- Country: Bangladesh
- Division: Dhaka Division
- District: Tangail District
- Upazila: Bhuapur Upazila
- Established on: 1984

Government
  - Type: Union Council
  - Chairman: Rohij Akondo (Bangladesh Awami League)

Area
  - Total: 19.56 km^{2} (7.55 sq mi)
- Elevation: 10 m (33 ft)

Population (2011)
  - Total: 27,500
  - Density: 1,410/km^{2} (3,640/sq mi)
- Time zone: UTC+6 (BST)
- Postal code: 1960
- Website: http://aloaup.tangail.gov.bd/

Aloa Union (Bengali: অলোয়া ইউনিয়ন) is a union of Bhuapur Upazila, Tangail District, Bangladesh. It is situated 27 km north of Tangail.

== Demographics ==
According to Population Census 2011 performed by Bangladesh Bureau of Statistics, The total population of Aloa union is 27500. There are 6760 households in total.

== Education ==
The literacy rate of Aloa Union is 42.9% (Male-45.6%, Female-40.5%).

== See also ==
- Union Councils of Tangail District
