= Ghatail Union =

Ghatail Union ঘাটাইল ইউনিয়ন
- Location of Ghatail Union in Bangladesh
- Coordinates: 24.4811953°N 89.9731798°E
- Country: Bangladesh
- Division: Dhaka Division
- District: Tangail District
- Upazila: Ghatail Upazila
- Established on: 1984

Government
  - Type: Union Council
  - Chairman: Md. Haidar Ali (Bangladesh Awami League)

Area
  - Total: 15.48 km^{2} (5.98 sq mi)
- Elevation: 19 m (62 ft)

Population (2011)
  - Total: 19,897
  - Density: 1,285/km^{2} (3,329/sq mi)
- Time zone: UTC+6 (BST)
- Postal code: 1980
- Website: ghatailup.tangail.gov.bd

Ghatail Union (Bengali: ঘাটাইল ইউনিয়ন) is a union of Ghatail Upazila, Tangail District, Bangladesh. It is situated 32 km north of Tangail, The District Headquarter.

== Demographics ==
According to the 2011 Bangladesh census, Ghatail Union had 4,910 households and a population of 19,897.

The literacy rate (age 7 and over) was 51% (Male-54.2%, Female-47.8%).

== See also ==
- Union Councils of Tangail District
