= Dhalapara Union =

Dhalapara Union ধলাপাড়া ইউনিয়ন
- Location of Dhalapara Union in Bangladesh
- Coordinates: 24.45925999°N 90.09289026°E
- Country: Bangladesh
- Division: Dhaka Division
- District: Tangail District
- Upazila: Ghatail Upazila
- Established on: 1984

Government
  - Type: Union Council

Area
  - Total: 74.96 km^{2} (28.94 sq mi)
- Elevation: 21 m (69 ft)

Population (2011)
  - Total: 53,221
  - Density: 710.0/km^{2} (1,839/sq mi)
- Time zone: UTC+6 (BST)
- Postal code: 1983
- Website: Official Website of Dhalapara Union

Dhalapara Union (Bengali: ধলাপাড়া ইউনিয়ন) is a union of Ghatail Upazila, Tangail District, Bangladesh. It is situated 16 km east of Ghatail and 48 km northeast of Tangail, The District Headquarter.

== Demographic ==
According to Population Census 2011 performed by Bangladesh Bureau of Statistics, The total population of Dhalapara union is 53221. There are households 12148 in total.

== Notable people ==
- Mafizuddin Ahmed, founding vice-chancellor of Jahangirnagar University and scientist, was born in "Gangair Sarkar Bari" in Gangair.

== Education ==
The literacy rate of Dhalapara Union is 30.7% (Male-34%, Female-27.5%).

== See also ==
- Union Councils of Tangail District
