= Gabsara Union =

Gabsara Union গাবসারা ইউনিয়ন
- Location of Gabsara in Bangladesh
- Coordinates: 24.59770447°N 89.77787018°E
- Country: Bangladesh
- Division: Dhaka Division
- District: Tangail District
- Upazila: Bhuapur Upazila
- Established on: 1984

Government
  - Type: Union Council
  - Chairman: Md Moniruzzaman (Bangladesh Awami League)

Area
  - Total: 64.44 km^{2} (24.88 sq mi)
- Elevation: 10 m (33 ft)

Population (2011)
  - Total: 26,678
  - Density: 414.0/km^{2} (1,072/sq mi)
- Time zone: UTC+6 (BST)
- Postal code: 1960
- Website: http://gabsharaup.tangail.gov.bd/

Gabsara Union (Bengali: গাবসারা ইউনিয়ন) is a union of Bhuapur Upazila, Tangail District, Bangladesh. It is situated 37 km north of Tangail. The union is fully detached from road transportation, located in the middle of Jamuna River.

== Demographics ==
According to Population Census 2011 performed by Bangladesh Bureau of Statistics, The total population of Gabsara union is 26678. There are 6243 households in total.

== Education ==
The literacy rate of Gabsara Union is 46.1% (Male-28.6%, Female-26.2%).

== See also ==
- Union Councils of Tangail District
