= Arjuna Union =

Arjuna Union অর্জুনা ইউনিয়ন
- Location of Arjuna in Bangladesh
- Coordinates: 24.51089194°N 89.85786438°E
- Country: Bangladesh
- Division: Dhaka Division
- District: Tangail District
- Upazila: Bhuapur Upazila
- Established on: 1984

Government
  - Type: Union Council
  - Chairman: Ayub Ali Mollah (Bangladesh Awami League)

Area
  - Total: 40.07 km^{2} (15.47 sq mi)
- Elevation: 10 m (33 ft)

Population (2011)
  - Total: 26,793
  - Density: 668.7/km^{2} (1,732/sq mi)
- Time zone: UTC+6 (BST)
- Postal code: 1960
- Website: http://arjunaup.tangail.gov.bd/

Arjuna Union (Bengali: অর্জুনা ইউনিয়ন) is a union of Bhuapur Upazila, Tangail District, Bangladesh. It is situated 36 km north of Tangail.

== Demographics ==
According to Population Census 2011 performed by Bangladesh Bureau of Statistics, The total population of Arjuna union is 26793. There are 6810 households in total.

== Education ==
The literacy rate of Arjuna Union is 41.1% (Male-42.5%, Female-39.8%).

== See also ==
- Union Councils of Tangail District
