= Rasoolpur Soor =

- Village
- Location in Uttar Pradesh, India Rasoolpur Soor (India)
- Coordinates: 27.43°N 82.18°E
- Country: India
- State: Uttar Pradesh
- District: Balrampur

Government
  - Type: Parliamentary Seat
  - Body: Shravasti

Languages
  - Official: Hindi
- Time zone: IST
- Website: www.balrampur.nic.in

Rasoolpur Soor is a village in Balrampur district of Uttar Pradesh, India. It is situated on the bank of the Pipra Talab.
