= Jangal Rasoolpur =

Village in Uttar Pradesh, India

Jangal Rasoolpur is a village in Gorakhpur, Uttar Pradesh, India.
