= Rasulpur Kulian =

- Village
- Location in Punjab, India Rasulpur Kulian (India)
- Coordinates: 31.305822°N 75.418449°E
- Country: India
- State: Punjab
- District: Kapurthala

Government
  - Type: Panchayati raj (India)
  - Body: Gram panchayat

Population (2011)
  - Total: 18
- Sex ratio 9/9♂/♀

Languages
  - Official: Punjabi
  - Other spoken: Hindi
- Time zone: UTC+5:30 (IST)
- PIN: 144601
- Telephone code: 01822
- ISO 3166 code: IN-PB
- Vehicle registration: PB-09
- Website: kapurthala.gov.in

Rasulpur Kulian is a village in Kapurthala district of Punjab State, India. It is located 7.5 kilometres (4.7 mi) from Kapurthala, which is both district and sub-district headquarters of Rasulpur Kulian. The village is administrated by a Sarpanch, who is an elected representative.

== Demography ==
According to the report published by Census India in 2011, Rasulpur Kulian has 2 houses with the total population of 18 persons of which 9 are male and 9 females. Literacy rate of Rasulpur Kulian is 80.00%, higher than the state average of 75.84%. The population of children in the age group 0–6 years is 3 which is 16.67% of the total population. Child sex ratio is approximately 500, lower than the state average of 846.

== Population data ==
Particulars	Total	Male	Female
Total No. of Houses	2	-	-
Population	18	9	9
Child (0-6)	3	2	1
Schedule Caste	0	0	0
Schedule Tribe	0	0	0
Literacy	80.00 %	85.71 %	75.00 %
Total Workers	6	6	0
Main Worker	6	0	0
Marginal Worker	0	0	0
