= Rasulpur, Rohaniya =

Rasulpur Rasulpur Sadaat
- Village
- Nickname: rasoolpur sadaat
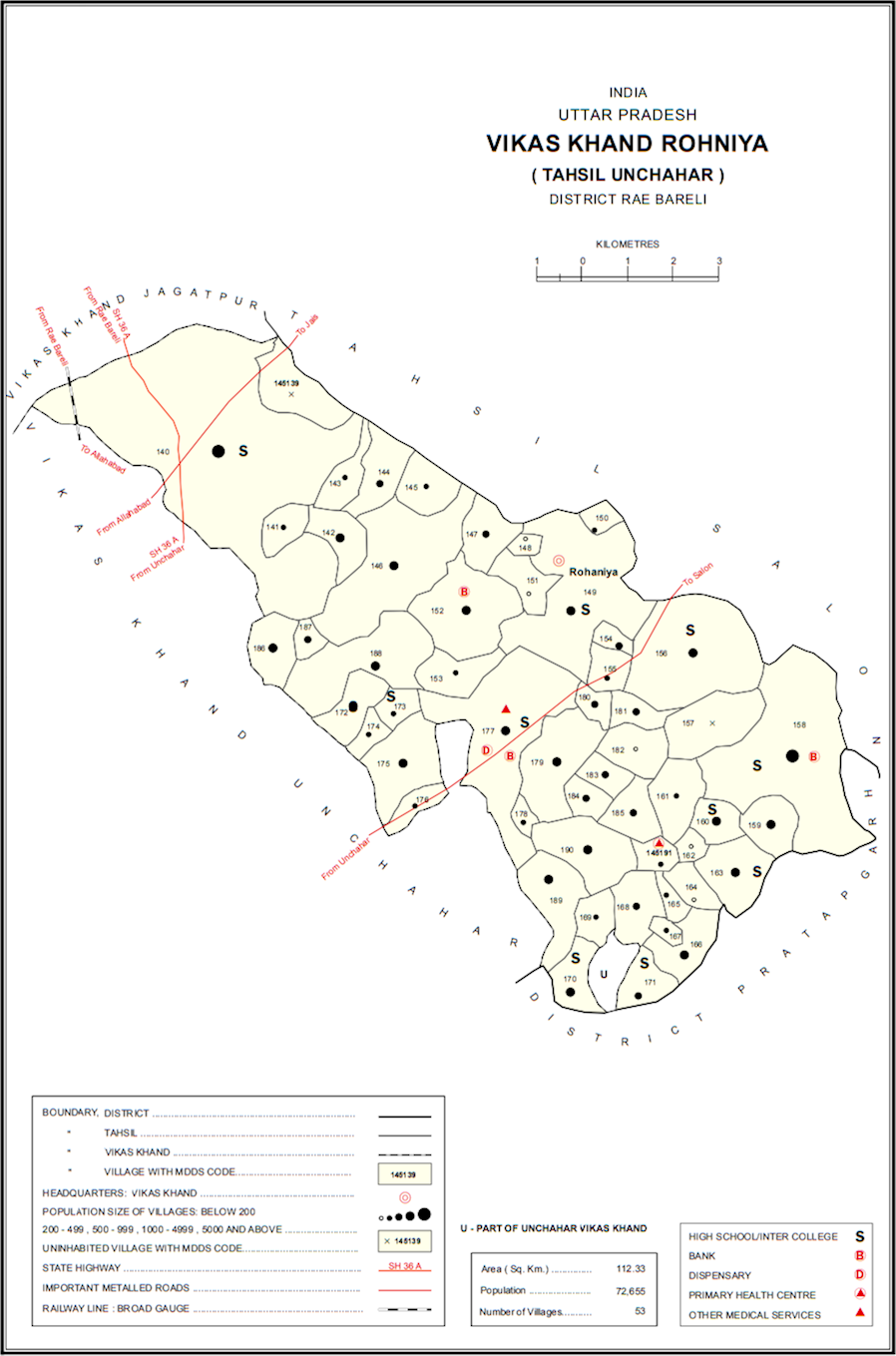
- Map showing Rasulpur (#158) in Rohaniya CD block

- Location in Uttar Pradesh, India
- Coordinates: 25.935399°N 81.431883°E
- Country India: India
- State: Uttar Pradesh
- District: Raebareli

Area
  - Total: 9.272 km^{2} (3.580 sq mi)

Population (2011)
  - Total: 7,671
  - Density: 827.3/km^{2} (2,143/sq mi)

Languages
  - Official: Hindi
- Time zone: UTC+5:30 (IST)
- Vehicle registration: UP-35

Rasulpur is a village in Rohaniya block of Rae Bareli district, Uttar Pradesh, India. One of the largest villages in the historical pargana of Salon, it is located 48 km from Raebareli, the district headquarters. As of 2011, it has a population of 7,671 people, in 1,379 households. It has one primary school and no healthcare facilities.

The 1961 census recorded Rasulpur as comprising 18 hamlets, with a total population of 3,089 people (1,498 male and 1,591 female), in 724 households and 707 physical houses. The area of the village was given as 3,342 acres and it had electricity and a post office at that point.

The 1981 census recorded Rasulpur (as "Rasoolpur") as having a population of 4,059 people, in 1,103 households, and having an area of 725.60 hectares. The main staple foods were listed as wheat and rice.
