= Rasulpur Brahmanan =

- Village
- Location in Punjab, India Rasulpur Brahmanan (India)
- Coordinates: 31.358417°N 75.462147°E
- Country: India
- State: Punjab
- District: Kapurthala

Government
  - Type: Panchayati raj (India)
  - Body: Gram panchayat

Population (2011)
  - Total: 148
- Sex ratio 68/80♂/♀

Languages
  - Official: Punjabi
  - Other spoken: Hindi
- Time zone: UTC+5:30 (IST)
- PIN: 144601
- Telephone code: 01822
- ISO 3166 code: IN-PB
- Vehicle registration: PB-09
- Website: kapurthala.gov.in

Rasulpur Brahmanan is a village in Kapurthala district of Punjab State, India. It is located 10 kilometres (6.2 mi) from Kapurthala, which is both district and sub-district headquarters of Rasulpur Brahmanan. The village is administrated by a Sarpanch, who is an elected representative.

== Demography ==
According to the report published by Census India in 2011, Rasulpur Brahmanan has 25 houses with the total population of 148 persons of which 68 are male and 80 females. Literacy rate of Rasulpur Brahmanan is 76.15%, higher than the state average of 75.84%. The population of children in the age group 0–6 years is 18 which is 12.16% of the total population. Child sex ratio is approximately 800, lower than the state average of 846.

== Population data ==
Particulars	Total	Male	Female
Total No. of Houses	25	-	-
Population	148	68	80
Child (0–6)	18	10	8
Schedule Caste	50	26	24
Schedule Tribe	0	0	0
Literacy	76.15 %	86.21 %	68.06 %
Total Workers	53	36	17
Main Worker	39	0	0
Marginal Worker	14	8	6
