= Ghulam Rasool Birhamani =

Pakistani journalist

- Born: 1970?–1980? Sindh Province, Pakistan
- Died: 9/10 May 2010; Wahi Pandhi, Dadu District, Sindh Province, Pakistan

Ghulam Rasool Birhamani (1970?–1980? – 9/10 May 2010), a native of the Sindh province, Pakistan, was working as a reporter for the Daily Sindhu Hyderabad in Wahi Pandhi (Gorakh Hill), Dadu on a controversial story involving child marriage when his body was found the morning after he went missing on 9 May 2010.

== Death ==
Birhamani, between the ages of 30 and 40, was kidnapped on 9 May 2010. His body was found the next day outside Wahi Pandhi in the Sindh province of Pakistan, and was reported to have been badly scarred and showed signs of torture.

At the time of his death Birhamani was working on a story about a 12-year-old girl who was forced to marry Najma Lashari, who was ten years her senior. This marriage was among members of the Lashari tribe, who were not very happy with Birhamani's report about child marriage. Birhamani allegedly received several threats from members of the tribe before he went missing.

According to a physician at the Johi Taluka hospital, Birhamani died of a head injury.

== Context ==
Birhamani spent most of his career focusing on ethnic violence and tribal politics. His family believes that had a great deal to do with his death, not just his more recent interactions with the Lashari tribe. According to CPJ, 90 percent of all journalists killed worldwide are local reporters.

== Impact ==
In the past decade thirteen other journalists have been murdered in Pakistan. The authorities have won convictions in only one of those cases, and that was for Daniel Pearl, a US reporter, in 2002. Impunity was the issue that journalists' groups focused on.

A seven-day mourning period in the Dadu district was announced for all press clubs and journalist organisations, and a procession was held by Birhamani's colleagues to protest his murder and call for the punishment of his killers. Political parties like the Pakistan People's Party also participated. Afterward, two Lasharis were arrested for Birhamani's murder.

== Reactions ==
A march was held to protest Birhamani's murder, and hundreds of journalists participated. The Pakistan Federal Union of Journalists, the Pakistan Press Foundation, and the Committee to Protect Journalists joined together to demand an investigation into the murder.

Bob Dietz, program coordinator for the Committee to Protect Journalists, said: “We call for a swift and through investigation into the killing of Ghulam Rasool Birhamani. Pakistan has an abysmal record in prosecuting the killers of journalists. It is time for the authorities to solve at least one case to show that these murders will not be tolerated."

Reporters Without Borders issued the following statement: "It is deeply shocking that a journalist could be killed like this because he dared to criticise certain customs and to expose tribal or family rivalries. We support the various local organizations for the defense of journalists who have expressed their grief and solidarity after this vile murder and we call for a rigorous investigation to quickly find those responsible."

Irina Bokova, who is the director-general of UNESCO, said: "I condemn the murder of Ghulam Rasool Birhamani. No society can allow violence to muzzle journalists while aspiring to uphold human rights and liberties, democracy and rule of law. Journalists are committed to report the truth as they see it. No effort must be spared to bring to justice those who seek to deprive us of our right to know what journalists have to say, and to agree or disagree with it."

== Career ==
Birhamani worked for over two decades for various Sindhi-language dailies, according to the journalists union. Before his death he was a reporter for the Daily Sindhu Hyderabad in Pakistan. He had previously reported on the conversion of minority Hindu girls to Islam, but his most recent scoop had been a story about child marriage.

== Personal ==
Birhamani is survived by a wife, two sons, and a daughter.

His name has been added to the Journalists Memorial, which is part of the Newseum, Washington, D.C.
