= Ghatail Upazila =

Ghatail Upazila ঘাটাইল
- Upazila
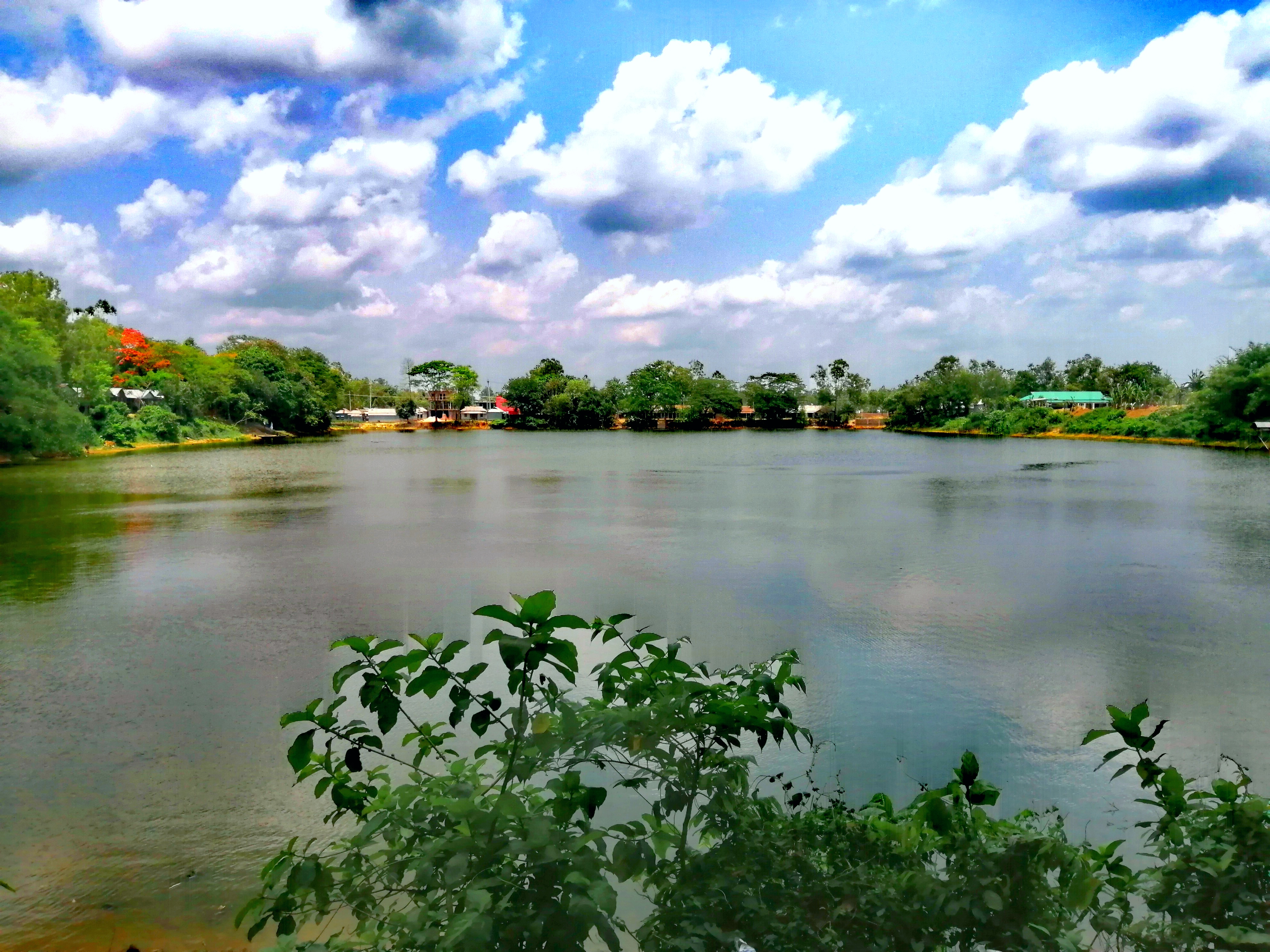
- Landscape around Sagardighi in Ghatail Upazila

- Coordinates: 24°28′N 89°58′E
- Country: Bangladesh
- Division: Dhaka
- District: Tangail
- Headquarters: Ghatail

Area
  - Total: 451.3 km^{2} (174.2 sq mi)

Population (2022)
  - Total: 448,742
  - Density: 994.3/km^{2} (2,575/sq mi)
- Time zone: UTC+6 (BST)
- Postal code: 1980
- Area code: 09225
- Website: ghatail.tangail.gov.bd

Ghatail (Bengali: ঘাটাইল) is an upazila located in Tangail District, Bangladesh. The upazila is bounded by Gopalpur and Madhupur upazilas on the north, Fulbaria and Bhaluka upazilas on the east, Kalihati and Sakhipur upazilas on the south, Bhuapur and Gopalpur upazilas on the west. Main rivers are Bangshai, Jhinai, Toak.

Ghatail Upazila mauza geocode map

== History ==
According to Akbarnama, one fight happened between Ishakha Army and Mughal Army in 1601 and Mughal Bahini defeated Ishakha in Atia fight. There was a small soldier post of Ishakha on Bank of Toke river which was called GHAT as well, and the connecting road between Ghat and Ghuiler Gor (hilly area of eastern part of Ghatail, which is also part of Madhupurer Gor) called AIL, joining this two part Ghat and Ail created name Ghatail.

=== Early history ===
During the rule of the Pala Dynasty, this area was used as a corridor between Borendro Somapura Mahavihara and Mayanamti Mahavihara in Samatata. Lausen established Pala ruling at Mymensingh area, Lauasen who was general of Dabaplala, second Pala King of Pala Dynasty. There was a small Pala landlord named Kalidash Pala, Josho Pala and Harishchanda Pala was ruling as zonal king under Debapala. Joshopala's capital was located between Vawal and Miadhupur Gor. Many old superstructures and buildings still exist at Shohor Gopinpur, Shamsher Chala of Ghatail and the name of the surrounding area (Fulmalir Chala, Malir Chala, Besshar Chala) also state the existence of that king. The Bangshi River once used as river way that time supporting the thousands years old lighthouse located on a top of deopara hill. there is a local Myth son of Dharamapala name Shagar Pala came here and start living, Shagar Pala had made one big pond, still name of that pond is Shagardighi size 12.80 Acre.

== Demographics ==
Religions in Ghatail Upazila (2022)
Religion	Percent
Islam	95.50%
Hinduism	4.11%
Other or not stated	0.39%

According to the 2022 Bangladeshi census, Ghatail Upazila had 121,341 households and a population of 448,742. 8.81% of the population were under 5 years of age. Ghatail had a literacy rate (age 7 and over) of 66.89%: 69.75% for males and 64.33% for females, and a sex ratio of 91.67 males for every 100 females. 67,397 (15.02%) lived in urban areas. Ethnic population is 3,749 (0.84%), of which 2,200 are Koch.

According to the 2011 Census of Bangladesh, Ghatail Upazila had 104,035 households and a population of 417,939. 92,468 (22.12%) were under 10 years of age. Ghatail had a literacy rate (age 7 and over) of 44.05%, compared to the national average of 51.8%, and a sex ratio of 1034 females per 1000 males. 35,245 (8.43%) lived in urban areas. Ethnic population was 3,812 (0.91%), of which Koch were 2,231 and Barman 1,204.

== Economy ==
Main occupations:' Agriculture 59.46%, agricultural laborer 16.7%, wage labourer 1.47%, commerce 7.78%, transport 1.54%, service 5.23%, others 7.82%.

Land use: Total land under cultivation 33300 hectares; fallow land 11871 hectares; single crop 22%, double crop 49% and treble crop land 29%. Land control: Among the peasants 48% are landless, 35% small, 11% marginal and 6% rich.

Value of land: The market value of the land of the first grade is Tk 8500 per 0.01 hectare. Main crops: Paddy, jute, mustard seed and potato, pineapple, ginger, turmeric and banana. Extinct and nearly extinct crops: Sesame, linseed, wheat, garlic.

Main fruits: Mango, jackfruit, banana, papaya, berry, watermelon and pineapple. Fisheries, dairies, poultry: Livestock welfare center 3, artificial insemination center 3, diary 7, poultry 21. Communication facilities Roads: pucca 4722 km, semi pucca 28.98 km, mud road 844.59 km. Traditional transport: palanquin, horse carriage, bullock cart, buffalo cart and dhuli. These means of transport are either extinct or nearly extinct. Cottage industries: Goldsmith 150, blacksmith 50, potteries 780, wood work 540. Hats, bazaars and fairs: Hats and bazaars are 22, most noted of which are Hamidpur, Ghatail, Dhalapara, Sagardighi and Pakutia; fairs 3. Main exports: Jute, pineapple, watermelon, paddy, oil and pipe. NGO activities: Operationally important NGOs are BRAC, Prosika, ASA, Buro Tangail, Thengamara Mohila Sabuj Songa, Palli Unnayan Sangstha, Shamadha and Jibika. Health centers: 1 Upazila Health Complex, 6 satellite clinics, 10 family welfare centers and 24 community clinics.

== Administration ==
Ghatail Upazila is divided into Ghatail Municipality and 14 union parishads: Anehola, Deulabari, Deopara, Dhalapara, Digalkandi, Digar, Ghatail, Jamuria, Lakherpara, Lakkhindar, Rasulpur, Sagardighi, Sandhanpur, and Sangrampur. The union parishads are subdivided into 291 mauzas and 411 villages.

Ghatail Municipality is subdivided into 9 wards and 17 mahallas.

== Education ==
There is one university college (GBG university college), Three colleges and one women's college, 3 higher secondary schools, one English Medium School (Ghatail International School), Play group to O level, Sponsored by Ghatail Cantonment), 37 secondary schools, 103 government primary schools, 52 non-government primary schools, 10 community primary schools and 52 madrasas.

- Ghatail Brahmanshason Govt. College
- Pakutia Public School and College
- Ghatail Cantonment English School and College
- Ghatail Cantonment Public School and College
- Ghatail Govt. Pilot High School
- Athail Shimul High School
- Wisdom Valley

== Notable residents ==
- Rafiq Azad, poet
- Mamunur Rashid, actor, director, and scriptwriter
- Mafizuddin Ahmed, founding vice-chancellor of Jahangirnagar University and scientist

== See also ==
- Ghatail
- Upazilas of Bangladesh
- Districts of Bangladesh
- Tangail
