= Pakutia Public School and College =

Educational institution in Tangail, Bangladesh

Location
- Pakutia, Ghatail Upazila; Tangail District; Bangladesh
- Coordinates: 24.5366°N 89.9830°E

Information
- Type: Secondary and higher secondary
- Established: 2 January 1952
- Principal: Jibunnesa
- Teaching staff: 24
- Enrollment: 1500
- Language: Bengali language
- Campus size: 3.57 acres (1.44 ha)

Pakutia Public School and College is an educational institution located at Ghatail Upazila of Tangail District in Bangladesh. Founded in 1952, the institution offers Secondary and Higher Secondary School Certificate. Jibunnesa is the current principal of the institution.

Kalinath Ghosh, a local resident, established a school called Pakutia M.E. School on 2 January 1915. The school came to be known as Pakutia Gana High School in 1945. The present school started its journey on 2 January 1952 and was officially recognized on 1 January 1953 by the then East Pakistan Education board.
