= Md. Golam Rosul =

Md. Golam Rosul is a former additional inspector general of Bangladesh Police and chief of Special Branch.

== Early life ==
Rosul has a master's in communication from the University of Dhaka and another master's in development studies from the American International University-Bangladesh.

== Career ==
Rosul joined the 12th batch of the Bangladesh Civil Service as a police cadre.

In 2001, Rosul was awarded the Exemplary Good Service Badge by the inspector general of police. He served in the United Nations Integrated Mission in East Timor.

Rosul joined the Police Staff College Bangladesh on 30 January 2013. He worked as the editor of Bangladesh Police magazine. From 2013 to 2017, he was the member directing staff (training) of the Police Staff College, Bangladesh.

Rosul was the vice-rector of the Police Staff College, Bangladesh

Following the fall of the Sheikh Hasina led Awami League government, Rosul was appointed member of the Police Reform Commission of the Muhammad Yunus led interim government. In December 2024, he was transferred to the Special Branch from the Police Staff College. He was promoted to additional inspector general from deputy inspector general. He prevented retired major general and director general of Border Guard Bangladesh Md Mainul Islam from leaving the country as Special Branch is in charge of immigration. In January 2025, he was appointed chief of the Special Branch replacing Md Shah Alam.
