= Rasulpur, Zira =

Rasulpur
- village
- Location in Punjab, India Rasulpur (India)
- Coordinates: 31.0500296°N 75.8250691°E
- Country: India
- State: Punjab
- District: phillaur
- Tehsil: phillaur
- Elevation: 246 m (807 ft)

Population (2011)
  - Total: 1,514
- Time zone: UTC+5:30 (IST)
- 2011 census code: 34277

Rasulpur is a village in the jalandhar district of Punjab, India. It is located in the phillaur tehsil.

== Demographics ==
According to the 2011 census of India, Rasulpur has 329 households. The effective literacy rate (i.e. the literacy rate of population excluding children aged 6 and below) is 66.22%.

Demographics (2011 Census)
	Total	Male	Female
Population	1514	823	691
Children aged below 6 years	185	104	81
Scheduled caste	389	209	180
Scheduled tribe	0	0	0
Literates	880	516	364
Workers (all)	475	436	39
Main workers (total)	458	423	35
Main workers: Cultivators	161	154	7
Main workers: Agricultural labourers	178	166	12
Main workers: Household industry workers	6	6	0
Main workers: Other	113	97	16
Marginal workers (total)	17	13	4
Marginal workers: Cultivators	3	3	0
Marginal workers: Agricultural labourers	2	2	0
Marginal workers: Household industry workers	0	0	0
Marginal workers: Others	12	8	4
Non-workers	1039	387	652
