= Rasulpur, Jhang =

Rasulpur
- Town
- Location within Pakistan
- Coordinates: 31°28′18″N 72°15′39″E
- Country: Pakistan
- Province: Punjab
- District: Jhang
- Time zone: UTC+5 (PST)

Rasulpur is a town situated in Jhang District, Punjab, Pakistan. It is located at 31°28'N 72°15'E with an elevation of 150 metres (490 ft).

In September 2014, this town braced for impact for the highest floods in the River Chenab in at least the previous four decades.
