= Rasoolpur Abad =

Rasoolpur Abad is a village in Bijnor district of Uttar Pradesh state in India. It is located south 10 kilometers of Kalagarh and Jim Corbett National Park, Uttarakhand.

== History ==
The village was set up in the early 1800s by a group of settlers from a nearby town.

== Geography ==
The village is located 7 kilometers from the town of Afzalgarh and 14 kilometers from Kalagarh. The Patharia river flows east of the village. The population of the village is around 8000. Agriculture is the main occupation.
