= Elcan Rasulov =

Azerbaijani actor

- Azerbaijani: Elcan Rəsulov
- Born: Elcan Etibar oglu Rasulov; Elcan Etibar oğlu Rəsulov; February 22, 1987 (age 39); Baku, Azerbaijan, USSR
- Citizenship: Soviet Union; Azerbaijan
- Education: Azerbaijan State University of Culture and Arts
- Occupations: Actor; TV presenter; Showman
- Years active: 2003 – present

Elcan Etibar oglu Rasulov (Azerbaijani: Elcan Etibar oğlu Rəsulov) (born February 22, 1987) is an Azerbaijani actor, TV presenter, showman.

== Life and career ==
Elcan Rasulov was born on February 22, 1987, in Baku city.

He entered the first grade in 1992. While studying at the school, he was a member of the "People's Theater" headed by honored artist Tofig Bayramov, which was part of the cultural center named after I.Abilov since 1999, and later the "Poetry Theater" headed by Mirahmad Askerov.

He has repeatedly won festivals and competitions. During his school years, he entered the "Paradise Theater" named after Nasiba Zeynalova, headed by Gudrat Hasanov, since 2002. He performed in various performances and during those years, he performed as an actor in the program "Gulp" broadcast on ANS TV channel. He hosted the "Sheep Reality SHOW" prepared within the "Gulp" project. In 2003, he graduated from secondary school No. 52 in Yasamal district and in the same year he entered the "Variety Acting" faculty of the Azerbaijan State University of Culture and Arts. The head of the course and art teacher was People's Artist of Azerbaijan Afag Bashirgyzy. The same year, he prepared his first television project - an entertaining, humorous program called "Shit Parade" on ATV, in which he acted as a presenter and actor. Later, he worked as an actor in the program "Morning" on ANS TV channel. In 2006, he began appearing on Space TV's "Comedy Show." He has been a leading actor on the channel since 2007. Later, he was the host of "Every Sunday" and "Every Morning" programs on Space channel. He worked as an actor at the Baku Variety Theater and as a department head in the Baku City Culture and Tourism Department. He acted as an actor in the series "Husband and Wife" broadcast on ATV. He is currently the host of "Three of Us" and "Stand up Baku Comedy" programs on the same channel.

== Films ==
- "Qafqaz"
- "1 milyon manat"
- "Oğlan evi"
- "Oğlan evi 2"
- "Təhminə Zaur"
- "Kəklikotu"
- "Qış nağılı"
- "Hareket 8 ( Turkish film)"
