= Ghulam Rasool Jamaati =

Sunni Hanafi Islamic scholar

Mufti Mufti Ghulam Rasool Jamaati

Personal life
- Born: 1923 CE Gujrāt, Pakistan
- Era: Contemporary era
- Region: Pakistani scholar
- Main interest(s): Fiqh, Hadith, Kalam, Logic, Arabic Grammar, Usool
- Known for: Qasim E Wilayat

Religious life
- Religion: Islam
- Denomination: Sunni
- Jurisprudence: Hanafi
- Tariqa: Naqshbandi
- Creed: Maturidi

Muslim leader
- Teacher: Allamah Sultan ahmad

Mufti Ghulam Rasool Jamaati (Arabic: مفتي غلام رسول جمعاتي) was a Sunni Hanafi Islamic scholar. He is accepted by his followers as the Grand Mufti of Great Britain.

== Biography ==
Mufti Ghulam Rasool Jamaati was born in 1923 in the city of Gujrat, Pakistan. He received the major part of his Islamic education from `Allāmah Sultān Ahmad whose educational transmission extends to the renowned scholar and jurist of his era Fazl-e-Haq Khairabadi. During his stay in Pakistan he taught the Islamic sciences as well as issuing fatwas on various issues.

In 1985 he moved to Britain and began teaching in London at the madrassa of Allama Pir Syed Abdul Qādir Shah Jilani. During this period, he was also appointed honorary Mufti of Muslim Council of Britain in 1990 and has since issued over 2,000 fatwas. Fluent in Arabic, Persian and Urdu, Mufti Ghulam Rasool was a master in numerous fields of Islamic scholarship including Jurisprudence, Principles of Jurisprudence, Exegeses, Principles of Exegesis, hadith, Principles of hadith, Doctrine, Logic, Scholastic Theology, Philosophy, Sufism, Moral and Ethical Philosophy, Polemics, Astronomy, Morphology, Syntax, Rhetoric, Oratory, Lexicology, Literature (including pre-Islamic), Poetry and others. As well as teaching and issuing fatwas, he has authored around 40 books on a variety of topics from the aforementioned sciences.

His command on the sacred and legal sources, and the ability to apply them to practical legal problems is the cause for his reverence among the more learned Sunni circles of the sub-continent. One of his most famous works is a compilation of fatwas written in Britain called Fatawa Britannia stretching to nearly 800 pages and includes many matters pertaining to legal issues that concern Muslims living in Britain.

== See also ==
- List of Islamic scholars
- Imam Ahmad Raza Khan
