= Ghulam Rasul (swimmer) =

Pakistani swimmer (born 1935)

Personal information
- Born: 1935 (age 90–91)

Sport
- Sport: Swimming

Ghulam Rasul (born 1935) is a Pakistani former swimmer. He competed in the men's 200 metre breaststroke at the 1956 Summer Olympics.
