= Ghulam Rasool (Telugu journalist) =

Indian journalist

Killing of Ghulam Rasool (Telugu journalist)
- Location: Masjidguda village, Ranga Reddy district, Andhra Pradesh (now Telangana state), India
- Date: 1992
- Attack type: Alleged extrajudicial killing, fake police encounter
- Deaths: 2
- Victims: Ghulam Rasool (journalist), Vijaya Prasada Rao (friend)
- Perpetrator: Alleged Andhra Pradesh Police officers
- Verdict: No convictions; case cited as example of fake encounters by activists and writers like Arundhati Roy

Ghulam Rasool was a journalist working for the Telugu newspaper Udayam and was killed in 1992 in what the Andhra Pradesh police claimed as an encounter with Naxalites.

== Incident ==
Ghulam Rasool, a reporter with the Telugu daily, Udayam, and his friend Vijaya Prasada Rao had a track record for being Naxalite sympathisers. The police claim the two were killed in an encounter when they were holding a meeting in an abandoned house in Ranga Reddy district's Masjidguda village.

== Scepticism ==
But the state journalists had a different version that Rasool and Rao were picked up by some police officers in a jeep and taken to a police station. They died during the third degree torture to which they were subjected.

== Arundhati Roy's tribute ==
While delivering a memorial lecture on Ghulam Rasool, Arundhati Roy said in 1996 that the murder of Gulam Rasool and Vijayprasada Rao in a fake encounter is part of large scale killing of unarmed citizens in the name of "curbing extremism" in the state where as many as 106 people were killed in these encounters in 1991 alone.
