= Bhuapur =

Bhuapur ভূঞাপুর
- Town
- Location within Bangladesh
- Coordinates: 24.4583°N 89.8667°E
- Country: Bangladesh
- Division: Dhaka Division
- District: Tangail District
- Upazila: Bhuapur Upazila

Government
  - Type: Pourashava
  - Mayor: Md. Masudul Haque Masud(Bangladesh Awami League)

Area
  - Total: 13.92 km^{2} (5.37 sq mi)

Population
  - Total: 28,708
  - Density: 2,062/km^{2} (5,341/sq mi)
- Time zone: UTC+6 (BST)
- Postal codes: 1960
- Area code: 9223
- Website: bhuapur.tangail.gov.bd

Bhuapur Municipality mahallah geocode map

Bhuapur (Bengali: ভূঞাপুর) is a town in Bhuapur Upazila, Tangail, Bangladesh. It is located 29 km north of Tangail city and 109 km northwest of Dhaka, the capital of Bangladesh. The town consists of 9 wards and 19 Mahallas.

== Demographics ==
According to Population Census 2011 performed by Bangladesh Bureau of Statistics, The total population of Bhuapur town is 28708. There are 6854 households in total.

== Education ==
The literacy rate of Bhuapur town is 59% (Male-61.7%, Female-56.2%).

=== Institutes ===
- Ibrahim Khan Government College.

Founded by Ibrahim Khan, writer.

- Shahid Zia Mohila College.
- Shamser Fakir Degree College.
- Lokman Fakir Mohila Degree College.
- Bhuapur Govt. Pilot High School.
- Bhuapur Pilot Girls High School.
- Palshia Rani Dina Moni High School.
- Momtaz Fokir High School.
- Gobindashi High School.
- Tepibari High school.
- Bharoi high school.
