= Ghatail =

Ghatail ঘাটাইল
- Town
- Location within Bangladesh
- Coordinates: 24.481195°N 89.973180°E
- Country: Bangladesh
- Division: Dhaka Division
- District: Tangail District
- Upazila: Ghatail Upazila

Government
  - Type: Pourashava
  - Mayor: Md Manjurul Haque (Bangladesh Awami League)

Area
  - Total: 8.08 km^{2} (3.12 sq mi)

Population (2011)
  - Total: 35,245
  - Density: 4,360/km^{2} (11,300/sq mi)
- Time zone: UTC+6 (BST)
- Postal codes: 1980
- Area code: 9225
- Website: ghatail.tangail.gov.bd

Ghatail Municipality mahallah geocode map

Ghatail (Bengali: ঘাটাইল) is a town of Ghatail Upazila, in Tangail District, Bangladesh. The town is situated 33 kilometres (21 mi) north of Tangail city and 114 kilometres (71 mi) northwest of Dhaka, the capital of Bangladesh.

== Demographics ==
According to the 2011 Bangladesh census, Ghatail town had 7,668 households and a population of 35,245.

The literacy rate (age 7 and over) was 72.1% (77.6% for males, 65.1% for females).
