= Nain, Raebareli =

Nain
- Village
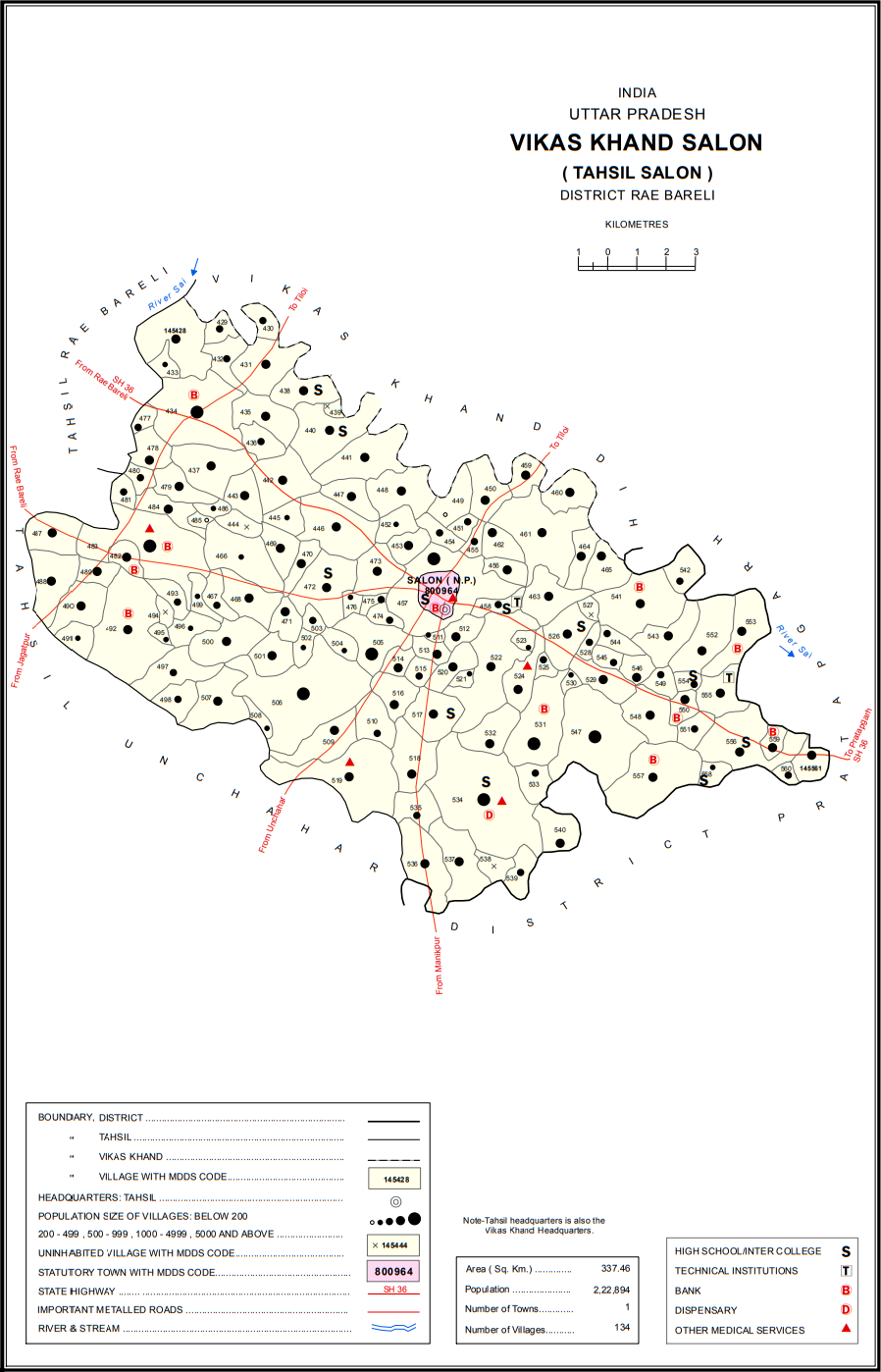
- Map showing Nain (#440) in Salon CD block

- Location in Uttar Pradesh, India
- Coordinates: 26.077448°N 81.421621°E
- Country India: India
- State: Uttar Pradesh
- District: Raebareli

Area
  - Total: 4.702 km^{2} (1.815 sq mi)

Population (2011)
  - Total: 2,028
  - Density: 431.3/km^{2} (1,117/sq mi)

Languages
  - Official: Hindi
- Time zone: UTC+5:30 (IST)
- Vehicle registration: UP-35

Nain is a village in Salon block of Rae Bareli district, Uttar Pradesh, India. It is located on the south bank of the Sai river, north of the main road from Salon to Raebareli. As of 2011, the village has a population of 2,028 people, in 372 households. It has one primary school and no healthcare facilities.

== History ==
Nain was historically the seat of a large taluqdari estate held by a branch of the Kanhpuria. Although they were locally known as taluqdars, they never officially held that status. Their old fort near the Sai could still be seen in the early 1900s, surrounded by ravines filled with brush.

The Kanhpurias of Nain originated with Arjun Singh, a younger brother of Chait Singh of Kaithaula. Arjun Singh was granted 12 villages by the raja of Tiloi in recognition of his military services in battle against the Sombansis of Sujakhar. His descendants expanded their possessions through warfare, and they frequently came into conflict with officials of the Nawabs of Awadh over refusal to pay revenue. Nain was thus the site of several battles between the Kanhpurias and the chakladars of Salon, including in 1802, 1815, 1833, 1836, 1843 (involving as many as 5,000 combatants), and around 1853. Additionally, in 1826, one Darshan Singh besieged the fort at Nain and led an attack during a wedding, killing and wounding many of the guests and driving the Kanhpurias out of Nain altogether for a year. During the Indian Rebellion of 1857, the Kanhpurias of Nain joined the rebel faction. Some of them were followers of Beni Madho Baksh, who had been wounded during Darshan Singh's attack in 1826. Afterward, a large part of the Nain estate was confiscated by the British.

At some point, the Nain estate became divided into various branches including Baghaula, Umran, Pachmadh, Basahia, and Itaura Buzurg.

At the turn of the 20th century, Nain was described as a small and relatively minor village, with a population of 907 in 1901. Most villagers belonged to the Ahir caste, and there was a grant-in-aid school and a small bazar. The village was held in pattidari tenure by "a large body of Kanhpurias".

The 1961 census recorded Nain (as "Naian") as comprising 3 hamlets, with a total population of 1,024 people (529 male and 495 female), in 203 households and 191 physical houses. The area of the village was given as 1,159 acres and it had a post office at that point.
