= Matrampur =

- Village
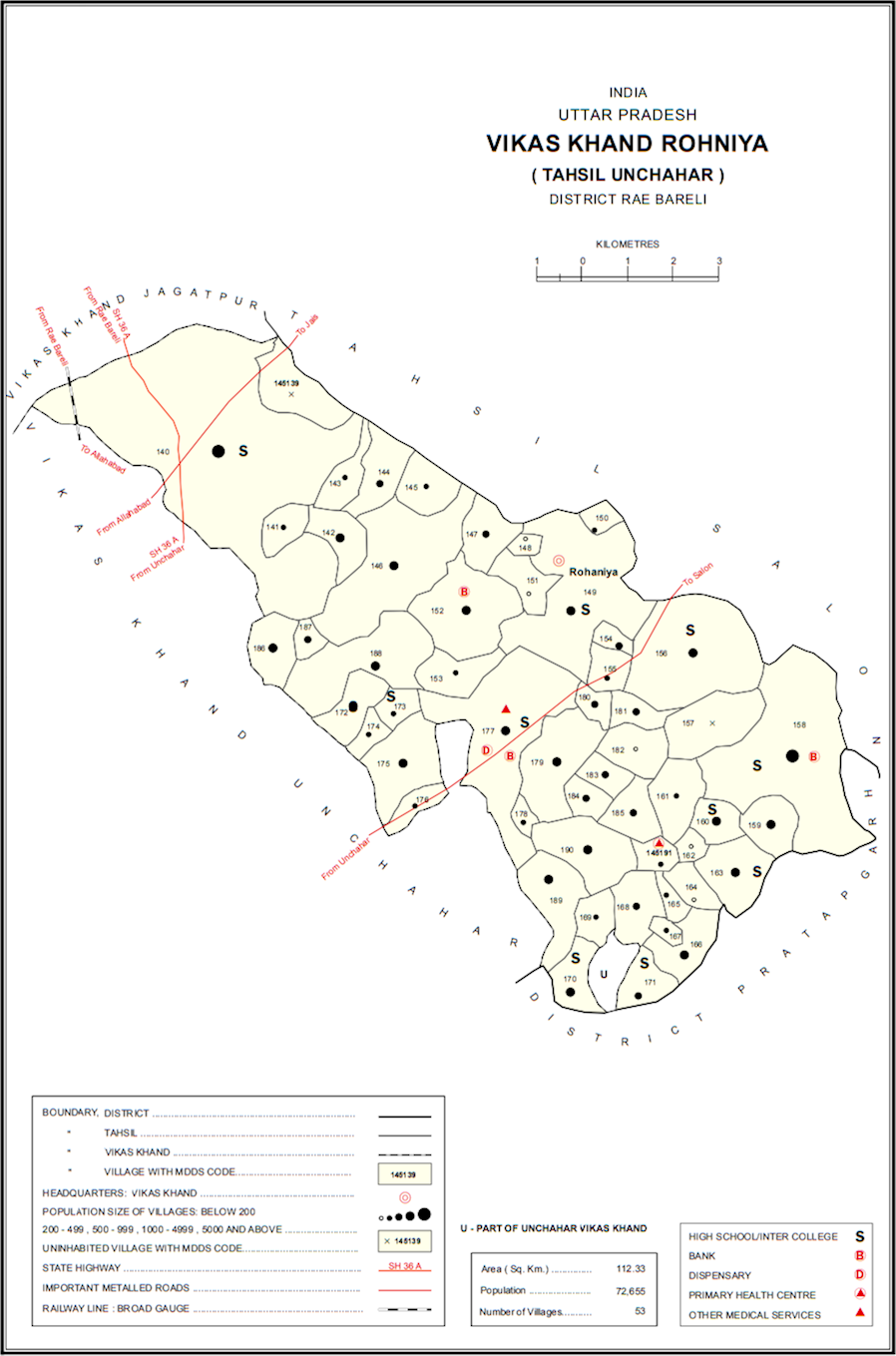
- Map showing Matrampur (#163) in Rohaniya CD block

- Location in Uttar Pradesh, India
- Coordinates: 25.912876°N 81.416678°E
- Country: India
- State: Uttar Pradesh
- District: Raebareli

Area
  - Total: 2.041 km^{2} (0.788 sq mi)

Population (2011)
  - Total: 1,456
  - Density: 713.4/km^{2} (1,848/sq mi)

Languages
  - Official: Hindi
- Time zone: UTC+5:30 (IST)
- Vehicle registration: UP-35

Matrampur is a village in Rohaniya block of Rae Bareli district, Uttar Pradesh, India. As of 2011, it has a population of 1,456 people, in 281 households. It has two primary schools and no healthcare facilities, and it hosts a weekly haat but not a permanent market.

The 1961 census recorded Matrampur as comprising 1 hamlet, with a total population of 535 people (265 male and 270 female), in 105 households and 102 physical houses. The area of the village was given as 513 acres.

The 1981 census recorded Matrampur (as "Matarampur") as having a population of 718 people, in 195 households, and having an area of 199.92 hectares. The main staple foods were listed as wheat and rice.
