= Mawai, Raebareli =

Mawai
- Village
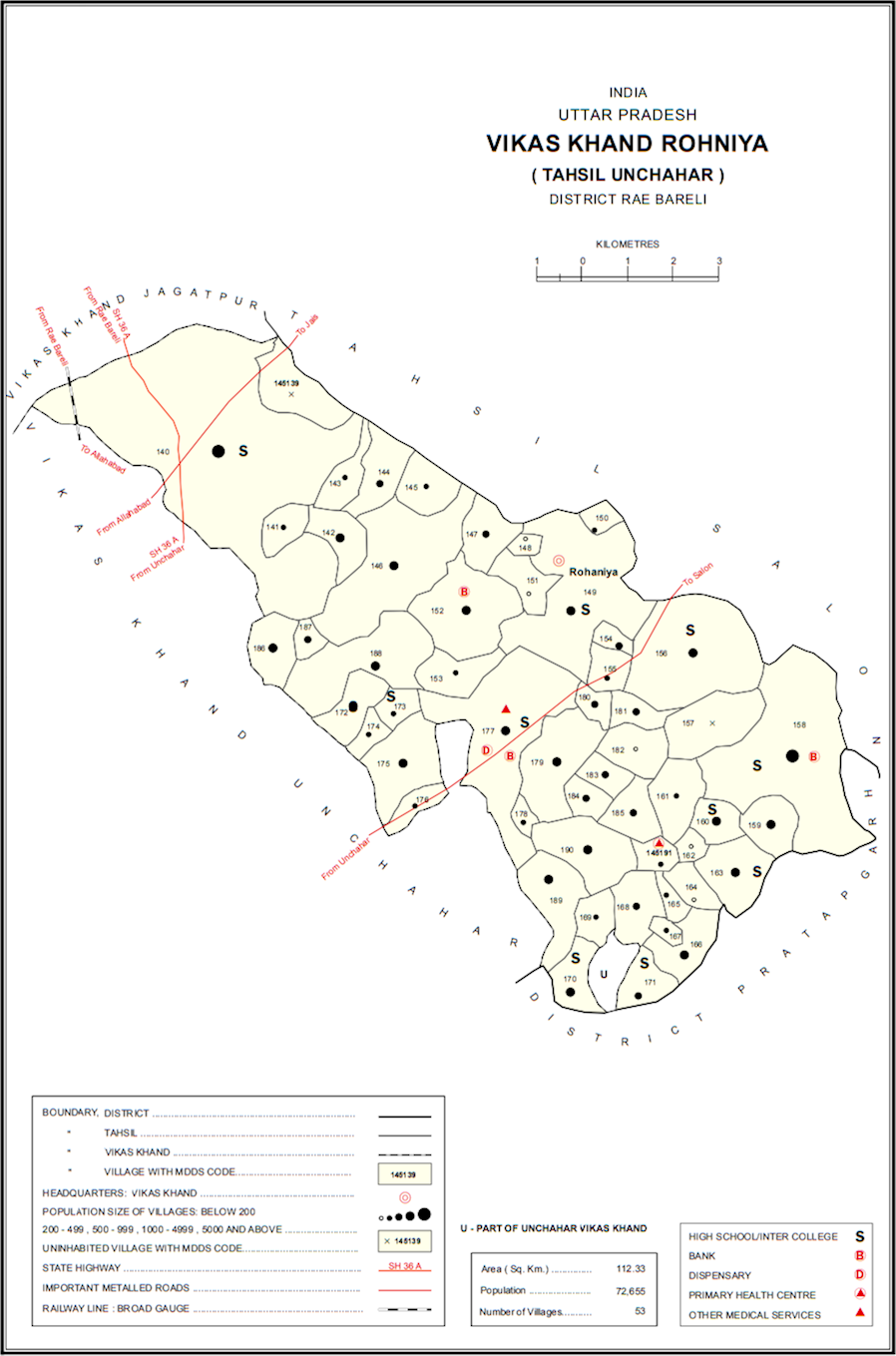
- Map showing Mawai (#190) in Rohaniya CD block

- Location in Uttar Pradesh, India
- Coordinates: 25.918542°N 81.389596°E
- Country: India
- State: Uttar Pradesh
- District: Raebareli

Area
  - Total: 2.47 km^{2} (0.95 sq mi)

Population (2011)
  - Total: 1,809
  - Density: 732/km^{2} (1,900/sq mi)

Languages
  - Official: Hindi
- Time zone: UTC+5:30 (IST)
- Vehicle registration: UP-35

Mawai is a village in Rohaniya block of Rae Bareli district, Uttar Pradesh, India. It is located 35 km from Raebareli, the district headquarters. As of 2011, it has a population of 1,809 people, in 314 households. It does not host a permanent market or a weekly haat.

The 1961 census recorded Mawai as comprising 4 hamlets, with a total population of 819 people (450 male and 359 female), in 179 households and 172 physical houses. The area of the village was given as 628 acres.

The 1981 census recorded Mawai as having a population of 1,088 people, in 258 households, and having an area of 254.14 hectares. The main staple foods were listed as wheat and rice.
