= Sarai Akhtiar =

Sarai Akhtiar Sarāi Akhtiār
- Village
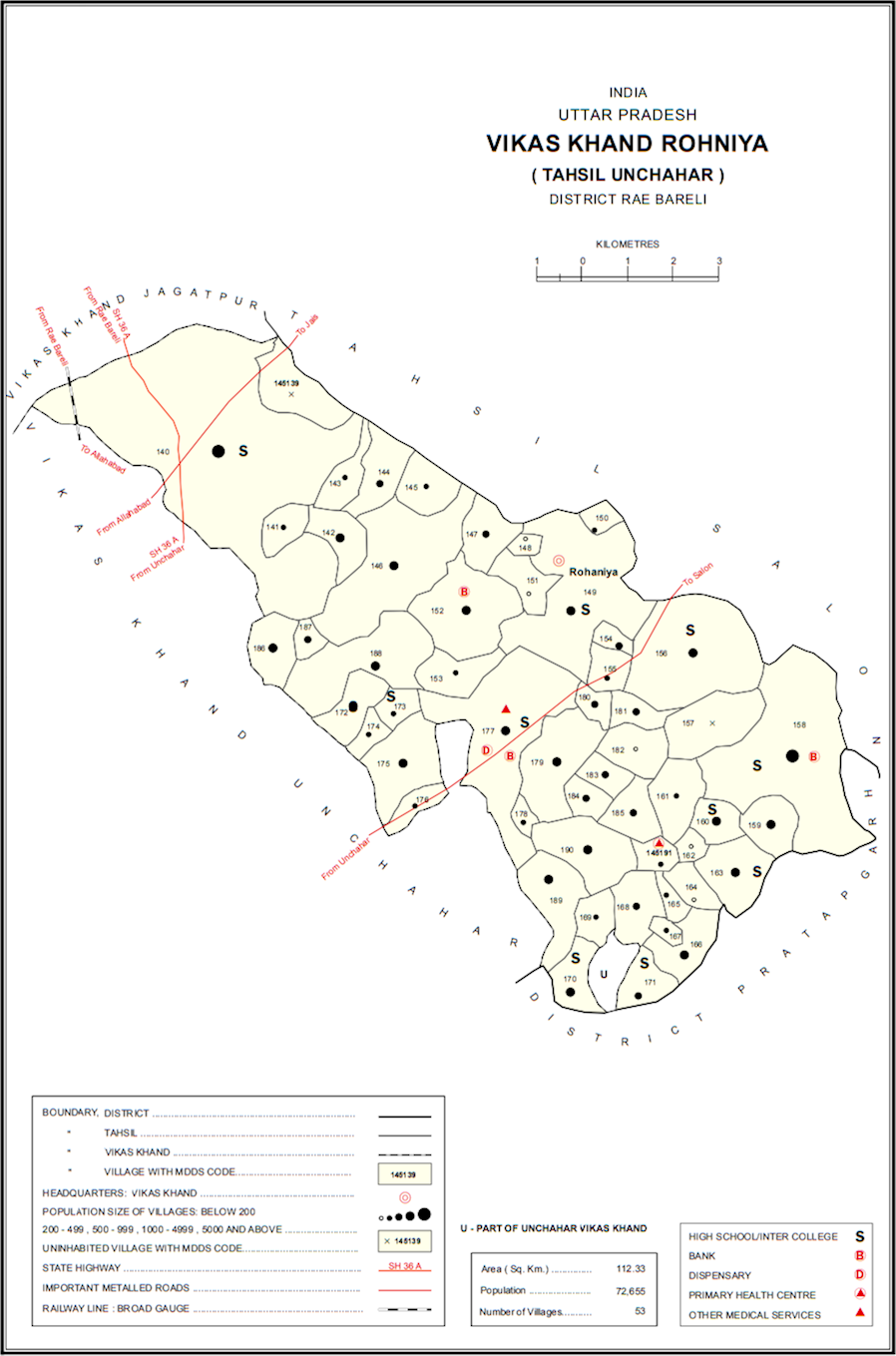
- Map showing Sarai Akhtiar (#160) in Rohaniya CD block

- Location in Uttar Pradesh, India
- Coordinates: 25.926772°N 81.415228°E
- Country: India
- State: Uttar Pradesh
- District: Raebareli

Area
  - Total: 0.952 km^{2} (0.368 sq mi)

Population (2011)
  - Total: 1,731
  - Density: 1,820/km^{2} (4,710/sq mi)

Languages
  - Official: Hindi
- Time zone: UTC+5:30 (IST)
- Vehicle registration: UP-35

Sarai Akhtiar is a village in Rohaniya block of Rae Bareli district, Uttar Pradesh, India. It is located 40 km from Raebareli, the district headquarters. As of 2011, it has a population of 1,731 people, in 305 households. It has two primary schools and no healthcare facilities, and it hosts both a permanent market and a weekly haat.

The 1961 census recorded Sarai Akhtiar as comprising 1 hamlet, with a total population of 536 people (283 male and 253 female), in 120 households and 113 physical houses. The area of the village was given as 232 acres.

The 1981 census recorded Sarai Akhtiar (spelled as "Sarai Akhtiyar") as having a population of 899 people, in 177 households, and having an area of 167.54 hectares. The main staple foods were listed as wheat and rice.
