= Parsipur =

Parsipur Parsīpur
- Village
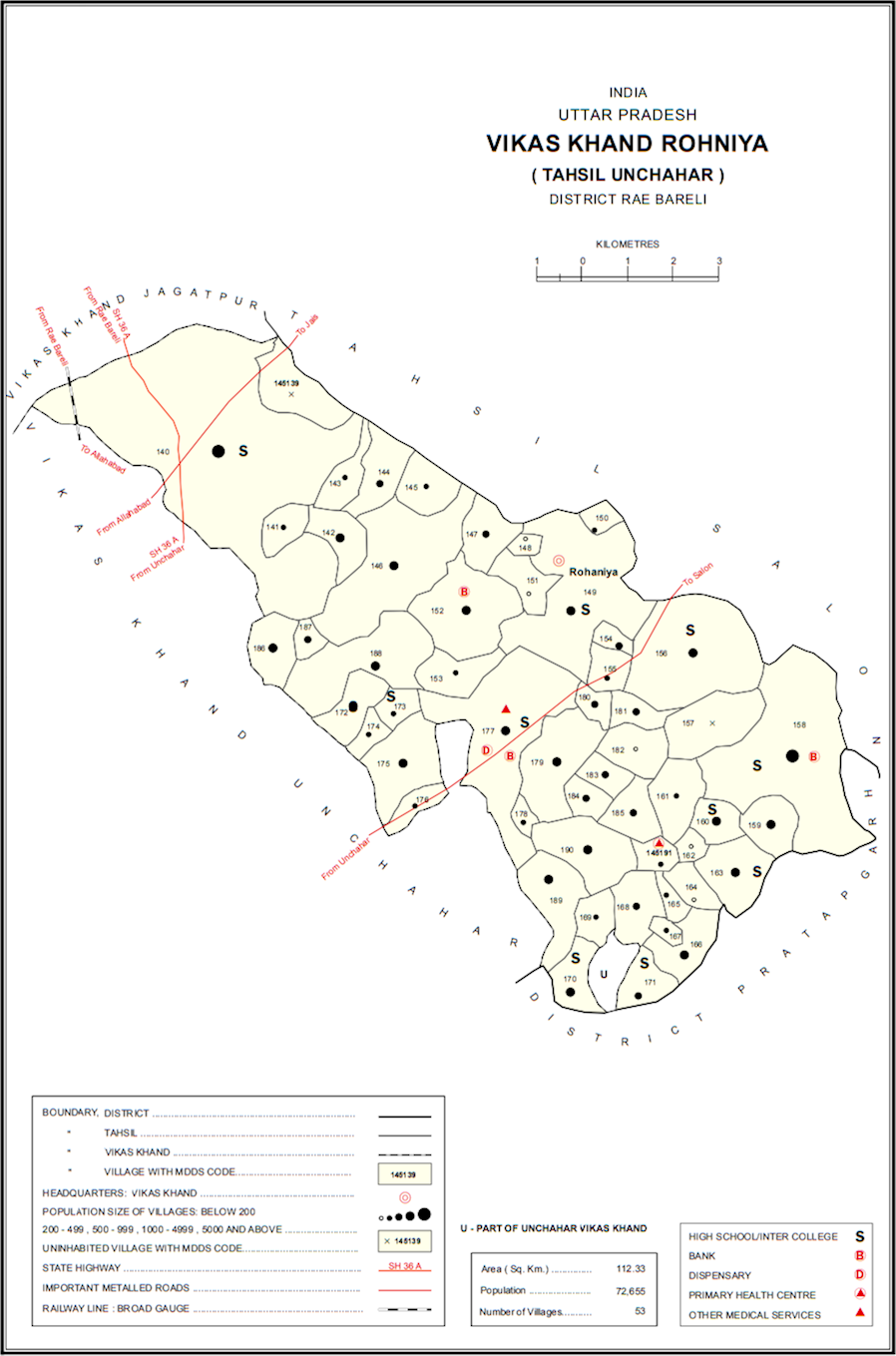
- Map showing Parsipur (#184) in Rohaniya CD block

- Location in Uttar Pradesh, India
- Coordinates: 25.928982°N 81.386008°E
- Country: India
- State: Uttar Pradesh
- District: Raebareli

Area
  - Total: 0.52 km^{2} (0.20 sq mi)

Population (2011)
  - Total: 552
  - Density: 1,100/km^{2} (2,700/sq mi)

Languages
  - Official: Hindi
- Time zone: UTC+5:30 (IST)
- Vehicle registration: UP-35

Parsipur is a village in Rohaniya block of Rae Bareli district, Uttar Pradesh, India. It is located 40 km from Raebareli, the district headquarters. As of 2011, it has a population of 552 people, in 119 households. It hosts a weekly haat but not a permanent market.

The 1961 census recorded Parsipur as comprising 1 hamlet, with a total population of 257 people (127 male and 130 female), in 61 households and 60 physical houses. The area of the village was given as 135 acres.

The 1981 census recorded Parsipur as having a population of 366 people, in 87 households, and having an area of 54.23 hectares. The main staple foods were listed as wheat and rice.
