= Mirzapur Aihari =

Mirzapur Aihari Mirzāpur Aihāri
- Village
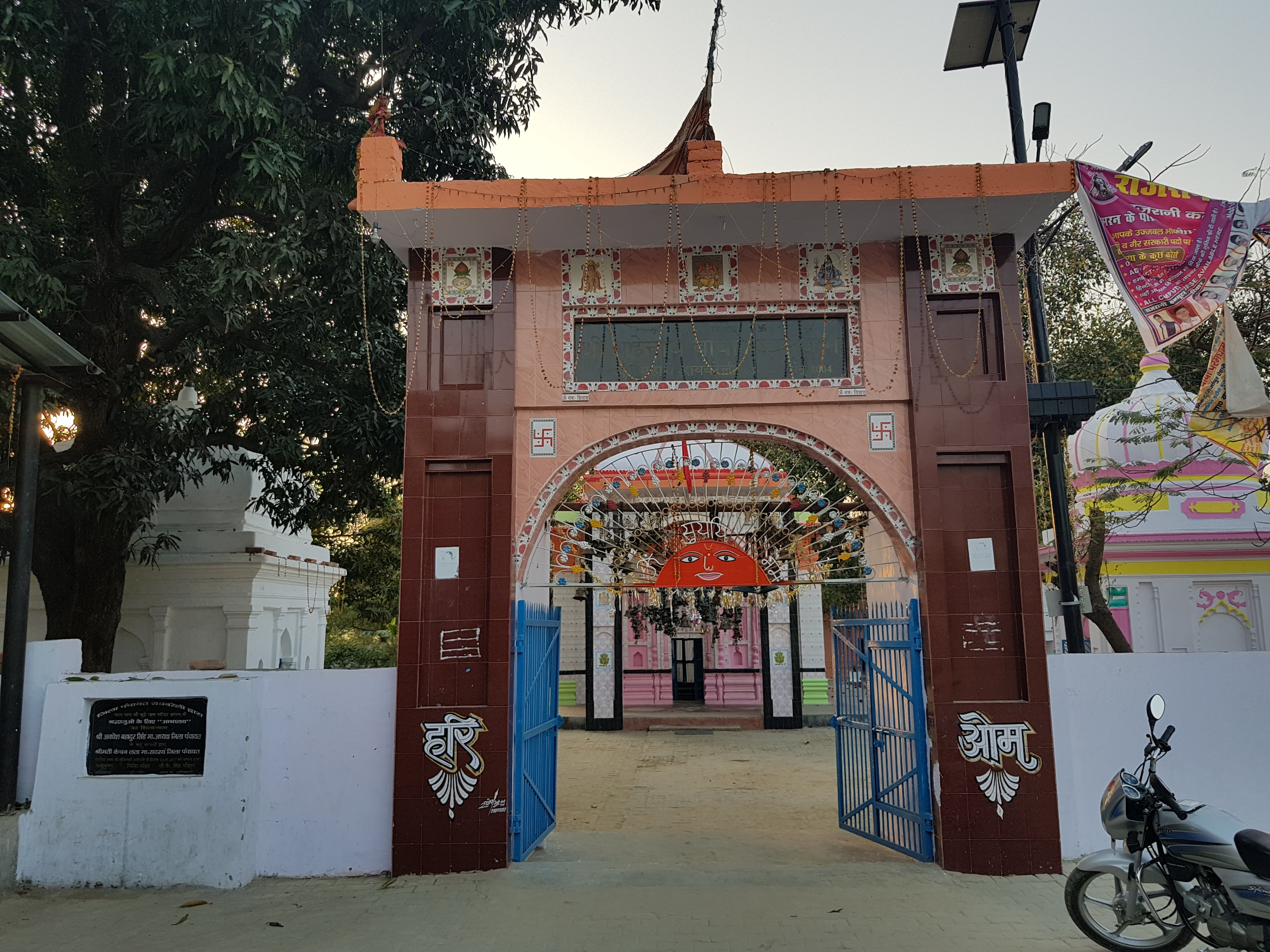
- Entrance to the Budhe Nath temple complex in Mirzapur Aihari

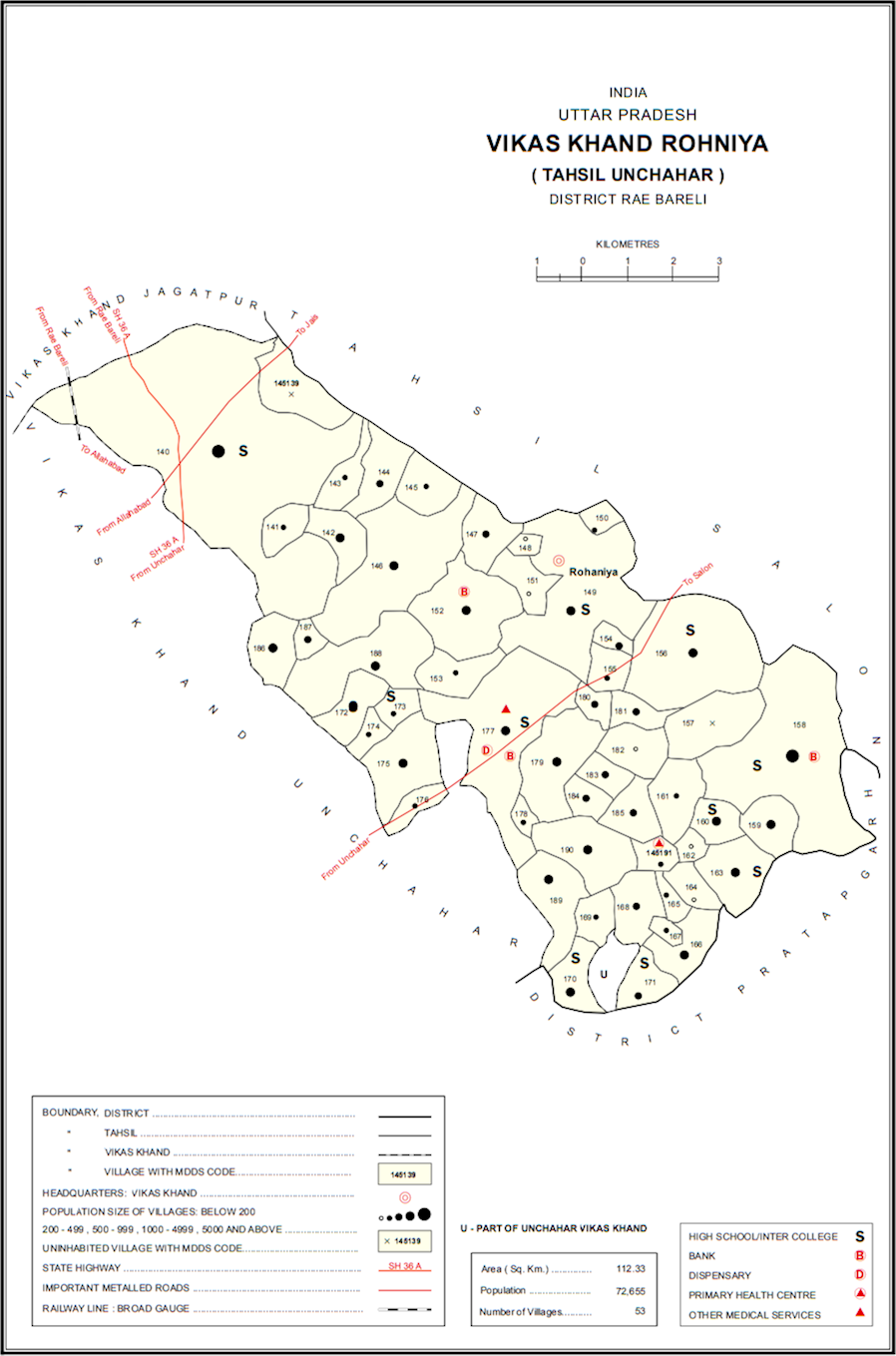
- Map showing Mirzapur Aihari (#146) in Rohaniya CD block

- Location in Uttar Pradesh, India
- Coordinates: 25.975721°N 81.334633°E
- Country: India
- State: Uttar Pradesh
- District: Raebareli

Area
  - Total: 5.459 km^{2} (2.108 sq mi)

Population (2011)
  - Total: 2,948
  - Density: 540.0/km^{2} (1,399/sq mi)

Languages
  - Official: Hindi
- Time zone: UTC+5:30 (IST)
- Vehicle registration: UP-35

Mirzapur Aihari is a village in Rohaniya block of Rae Bareli district, Uttar Pradesh, India. It is located 34 km from Raebareli, the district headquarters. As of 2011, it has a population of 2,948 people, in 542 households. It has one primary school and no healthcare facilities, as well as a sub post office. It does not host a permanent market or a weekly haat. It belongs to the nyaya panchayat of Rohaniya.

The 1951 census recorded Mirzapur Aihari as comprising 10 hamlets, with a total population of 1,137 people (584 male and 553 female), in 270 households and 254 physical houses. The area of the village was given as 1,329 acres. 160 residents were literate, 149 male and 11 female. The village was listed as belonging to the pargana of Salon and the thana of Mustafabad.

The 1961 census recorded Mirzapur Aihari as comprising 6 hamlets, with a total population of 1,355 people (667 male and 688 female), in 305 households and 305 physical houses. The area of the village was given as 1,329 acres.

The 1981 census recorded Mirzapur Aihari (as "Mirzapur Ahari") as having a population of 1,832 people, in 395 households, and having an area of 545.93 hectares. The main staple foods were listed as wheat and rice.

The 1991 census recorded Mirzapur Aihari (as "Mirazapur Aihari") as having a total population of 2,183 people (1,134 male and 1,049 female), in 425 households and 418 physical houses. The area of the village was listed as 540 hectares. Members of the 0-6 age group numbered 459, or 21% of the total; this group was 56% male (256) and 44% female (203). Members of scheduled castes made up 30% of the village's population, while no members of scheduled tribes were recorded. The literacy rate of the village was 28% (511 men and 109 women). 617 people were classified as main workers (570 men and 47 women), while 56 people were classified as marginal workers (8 men and 48 women); the remaining 1,510 residents were non-workers. The breakdown of main workers by employment category was as follows: 343 cultivators (i.e. people who owned or leased their own land); 186 agricultural labourers (i.e. people who worked someone else's land in return for payment); 2 workers in livestock, forestry, fishing, hunting, plantations, orchards, etc.; 0 in mining and quarrying; 2 household industry workers; 3 workers employed in other manufacturing, processing, service, and repair roles; 1 construction worker; 8 employed in trade and commerce; 0 employed in transport, storage, and communications; and 72 in other services.
