= Rohaniya =

Rohaniya Rohniya, Rohania
- Village
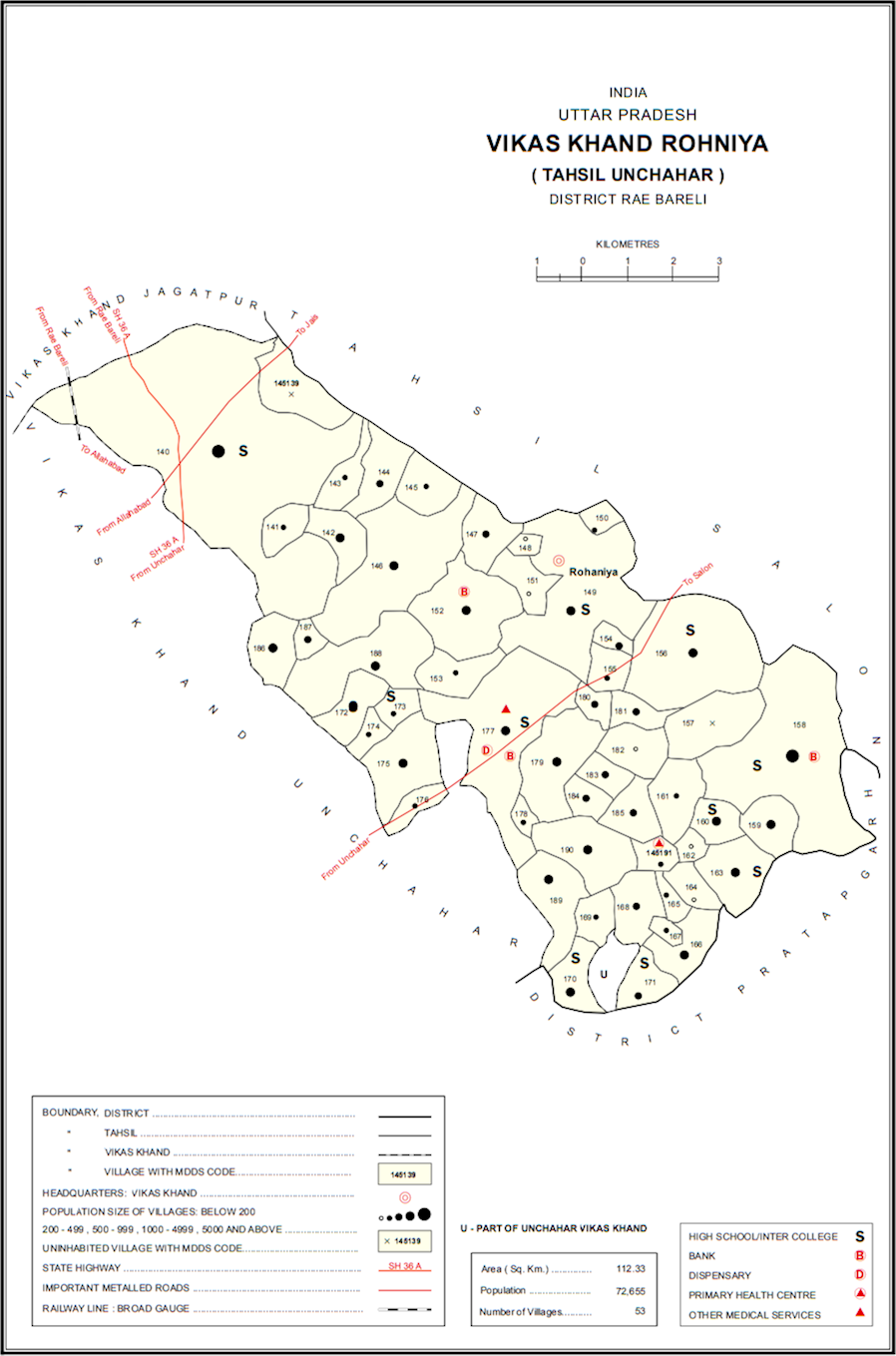
- Map of Rohaniya CD block

- Location in Uttar Pradesh, India
- Coordinates: 25.979102°N 81.383082°E
- Country India: India
- State: Uttar Pradesh
- District: Raebareli

Area
  - Total: 7.705 km^{2} (2.975 sq mi)

Population (2011)
  - Total: 3,880
  - Density: 504/km^{2} (1,300/sq mi)

Languages
  - Official: Hindi
- Time zone: UTC+5:30 (IST)
- Vehicle registration: UP-35

Rohaniya is a village and corresponding community development block in Unchahar tehsil of Rae Bareli district, Uttar Pradesh, India. It is located 43 km from Raebareli, the district headquarters. As of 2011, Rohaniya has a population of 3,880 people, in 751 households. It has one primary school and One healthcare facilities.

The 1961 census recorded Rohaniya (as "Rohania") as comprising 8 hamlets, with a total population of 1,488 people (732 male and 756 female), in 337 households and 335 physical houses. The area of the village was given as 1,904 acres and was electrified at that point.

The 1981 census recorded Rohaniya as having a population of 2,126 people, in 430 households, and having an area of 770.52 hectares. The main staple foods were listed as wheat and rice.

== Villages ==
Rohaniya CD block has the following 53 villages:

Village name	Total land area (hectares)	Population (in 2011)
Ram Ganj	172.2	0
Itaura Buzurg	2,014	13,851
Salarpur	74.2	442
Aihari Buzurg	152.7	1,101
Tamas Garh	102	400
Khan Alampur Sathara	138.2	605
Dharupur	152.3	318
Mirazapur Aihari	545.9	2,948
Dhamauli	176.7	751
Sikandarabad	72.7	4
Rohaniya (block headquarters)	770.5	3,880
Patti Pitha	24.7	384
Neknampur	115.2	177
Raipur	312	1,256
Sumer Bag	127	337
Dhaurhara	43.6	680
Masaudabad	140.6	422
Usarauna	532.9	3,380
Marha Mau	213.3	0
Rasoolpur	927.2	7,671
Salimpur Baherwar	102.2	1,232
Sarain Akhtiyar	95.2	1,731
Bandai	168	227
Loharani	26.8	187
Matrampur	204.1	1,456
Suhapar	78.1	196
Hari Vanshpur	38.9	286
Itaili	125.2	1,171
Chak Bhira	48	401
Baramjitpur Urf Khwata	10	615
Bhikhnapur Kalapur	61	428
Hamidpur Bara Gaon	21	1,105
Alinagar Askaran	101.2	945
Chhatauna Bhariyani	150	1,775
Raghunathpur Labedawa	34	381
Hajaribag	31	342
Gagahara Gulal Ganj	291	2,361
Raghunathpur Paterwa	34	381
Umaran	664.1	4,786
Dakpur	67	297
Kamalpur	288	1,235
Pure Khiro Dhar	38	651
Bachhaiyyapur	173	505
Lakshman Ganj	143	73
Samasapur Patauna	97	600
Parsipur	52	552
Sarakpur	139	953
Prayagpur Nandaura	174	1,862
Nandaura Mafi	50	583
Sareni	201	1,864
Mawai	247	1,809
Gaura	44	351
