= Gaura, Raebareli =

Gaura
- Village
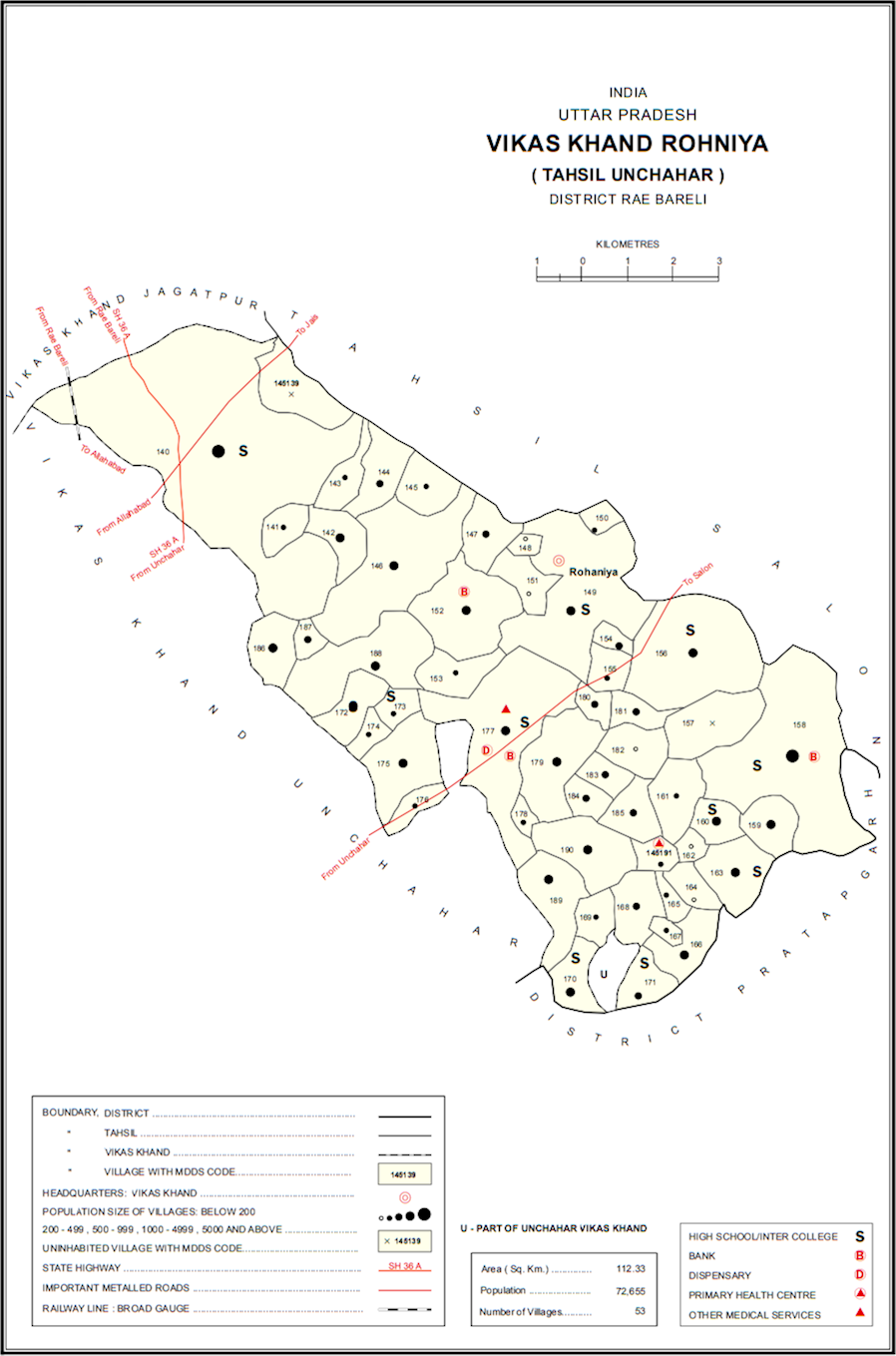
- Map showing Gaura (#145191) in Rohaniya CD block

- Location in Uttar Pradesh, India
- Coordinates: 25.917904°N 81.401108°E
- Country: India
- State: Uttar Pradesh
- District: Raebareli

Area
  - Total: 0.44 km^{2} (0.17 sq mi)

Population (2011)
  - Total: 351
  - Density: 800/km^{2} (2,100/sq mi)

Languages
  - Official: Hindi
- Time zone: UTC+5:30 (IST)
- Vehicle registration: UP-35

Gaura is a village in Rohaniya block of Rae Bareli district, Uttar Pradesh, India. As of 2011, it has a population of 351 people, in 72 households. It has two primary schools and one primary health centre, and it does not host a permanent market or a weekly haat.

The 1961 census recorded Gaura as comprising 1 hamlet, with a total population of 170 people (91 male and 79 female), in 35 households and 35 physical houses. The area of the village was given as 111 acres.

The 1981 census recorded Gaura as having a population of 221 people, in 48 households, and having an area of 44.11 hectares. The main staple foods were listed as wheat and rice.
