= Kamalpur, Rohaniya =

Kamalpur Kamālpur
- Village
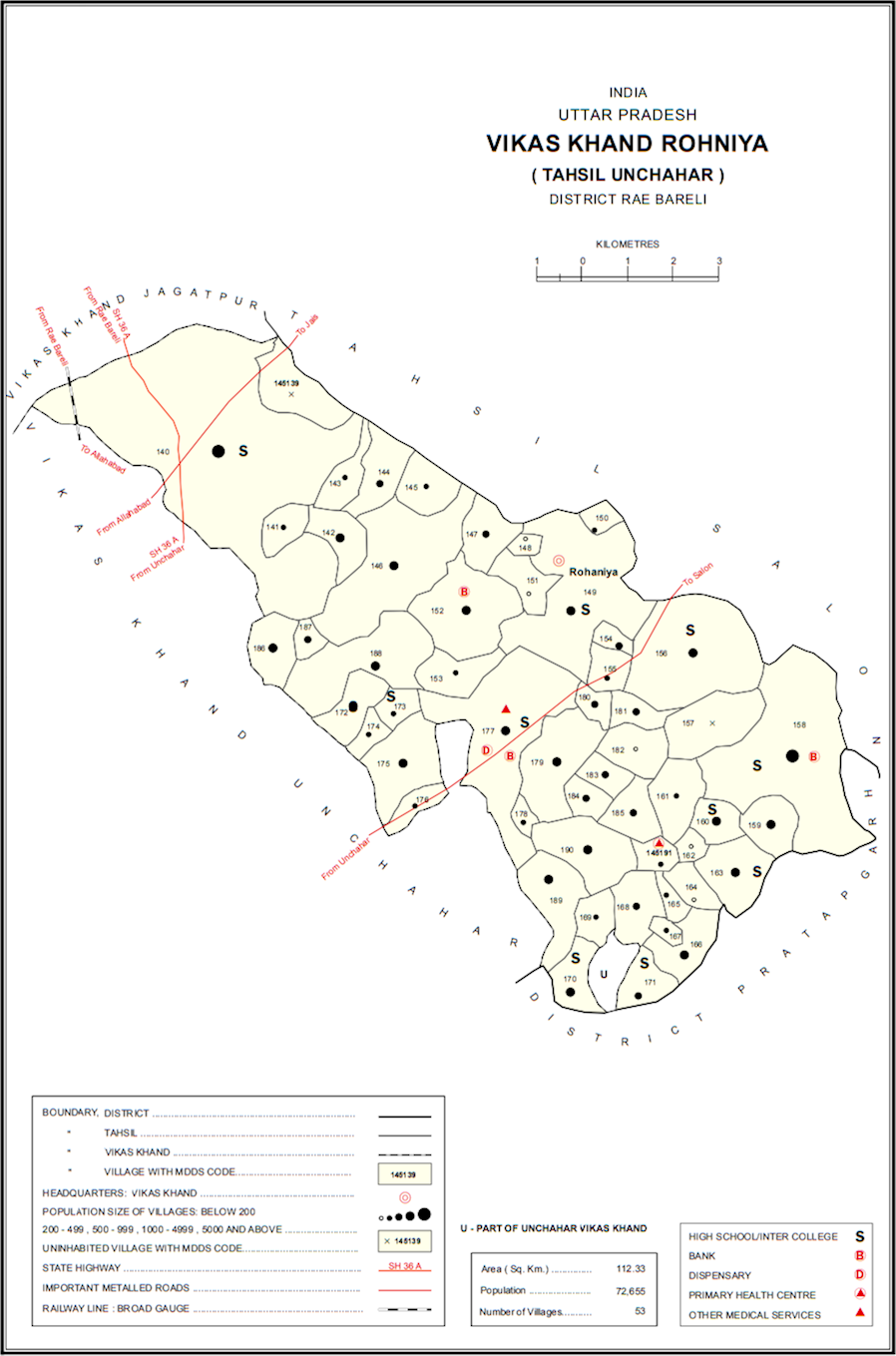
- Map showing Kamalpur (#179) in Rohaniya CD block

- Location in Uttar Pradesh, India
- Coordinates: 25.939686°N 81.37291°E
- Country: India
- State: Uttar Pradesh
- District: Raebareli

Area
  - Total: 2.88 km^{2} (1.11 sq mi)

Population (2011)
  - Total: 1,235
  - Density: 429/km^{2} (1,110/sq mi)

Languages
  - Official: Hindi
- Time zone: UTC+5:30 (IST)
- Vehicle registration: UP-35

Kamalpur is a village in Rohaniya block of Rae Bareli district, Uttar Pradesh, India. It is located 40 km from Raebareli, the district headquarters. As of 2011, it has a population of 1,235 people, in 238 households. It has no schools and no healthcare facilities, and it does not host a permanent market or a weekly haat.

The 1961 census recorded Kamalpur as comprising 3 hamlets, with a total population of 573 people (312 male and 261 female), in 100 households and 100 physical houses. The area of the village was given as 709 acres.

The 1981 census recorded Kamalpur as having a population of 644 people, in 220 households, and having an area of 287.73 hectares. The main staple foods were listed as wheat and rice.
