= Chak Bhira =

Chak Bhira Chak Bhīra
- Village
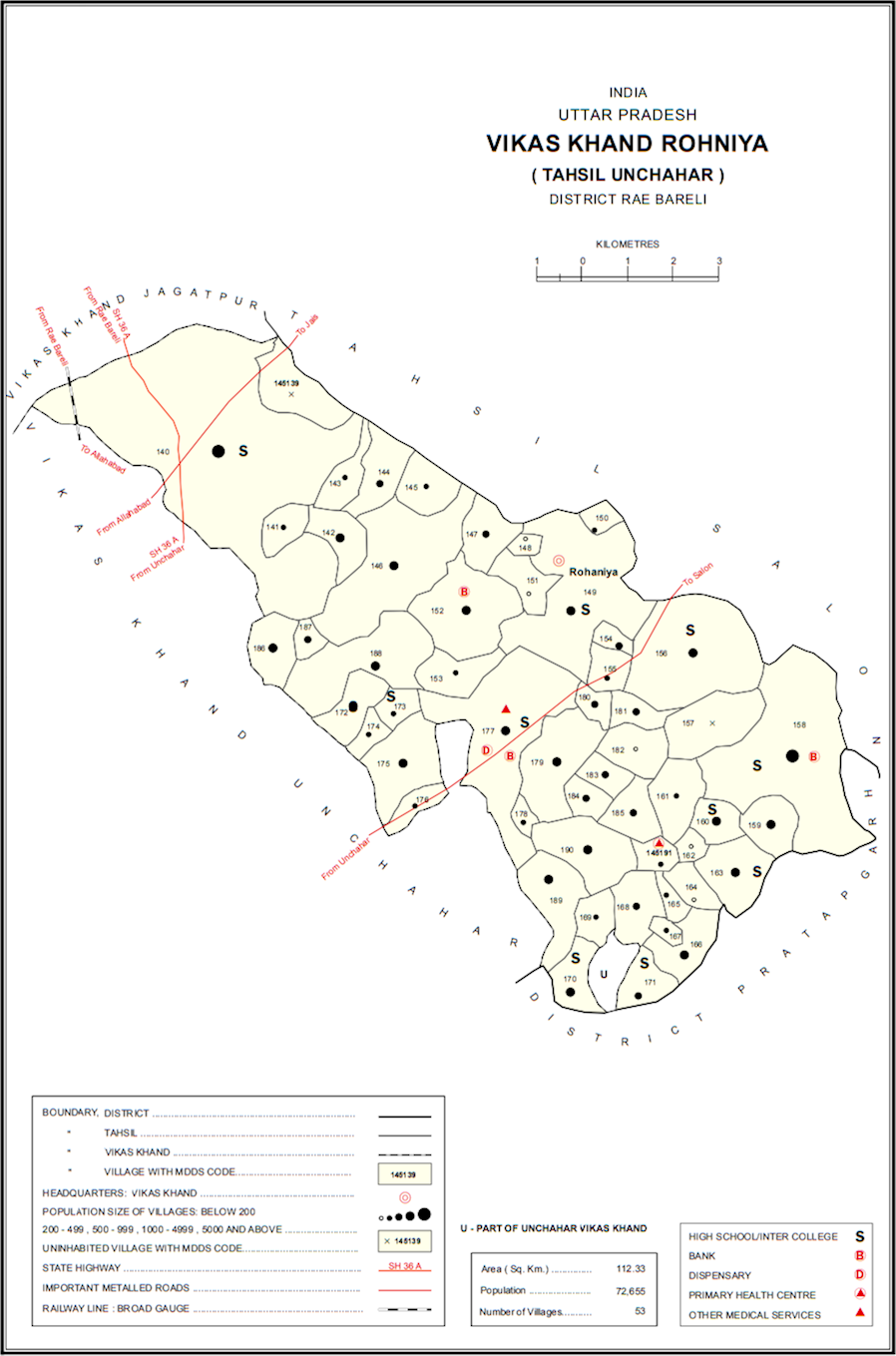
- Map showing Chak Bhira (#167) in Rohaniya CD block

- Location in Uttar Pradesh, India
- Coordinates: 25.904509°N 81.399962°E
- Country: India
- State: Uttar Pradesh
- District: Raebareli

Area
  - Total: 0.48 km^{2} (0.19 sq mi)

Population (2011)
  - Total: 401
  - Density: 840/km^{2} (2,200/sq mi)

Languages
  - Official: Hindi
- Time zone: UTC+5:30 (IST)
- Vehicle registration: UP-35

Chak Bhira is a village in Rohaniya block of Rae Bareli district, Uttar Pradesh, India. It is located 40 km from Raebareli, the district headquarters. As of 2011, it has a population of 401 people, in 79 households. It has one primary school and no healthcare facilities, and it hosts a weekly haat but not a permanent market.

The 1961 census recorded Chak Bhira as comprising 1 hamlet, with a total population of 117 people (57 male and 60 female), in 22 households and 22 physical houses. The area of the village was given as 110 acres.

The 1981 census recorded Chak Bhira as having a population of 213 people, in 45 households, and having an area of 47.75 hectares. The main staple foods were listed as wheat and rice.
