= Dhaurahra, Raebareli =

Dhaurahra
- Village
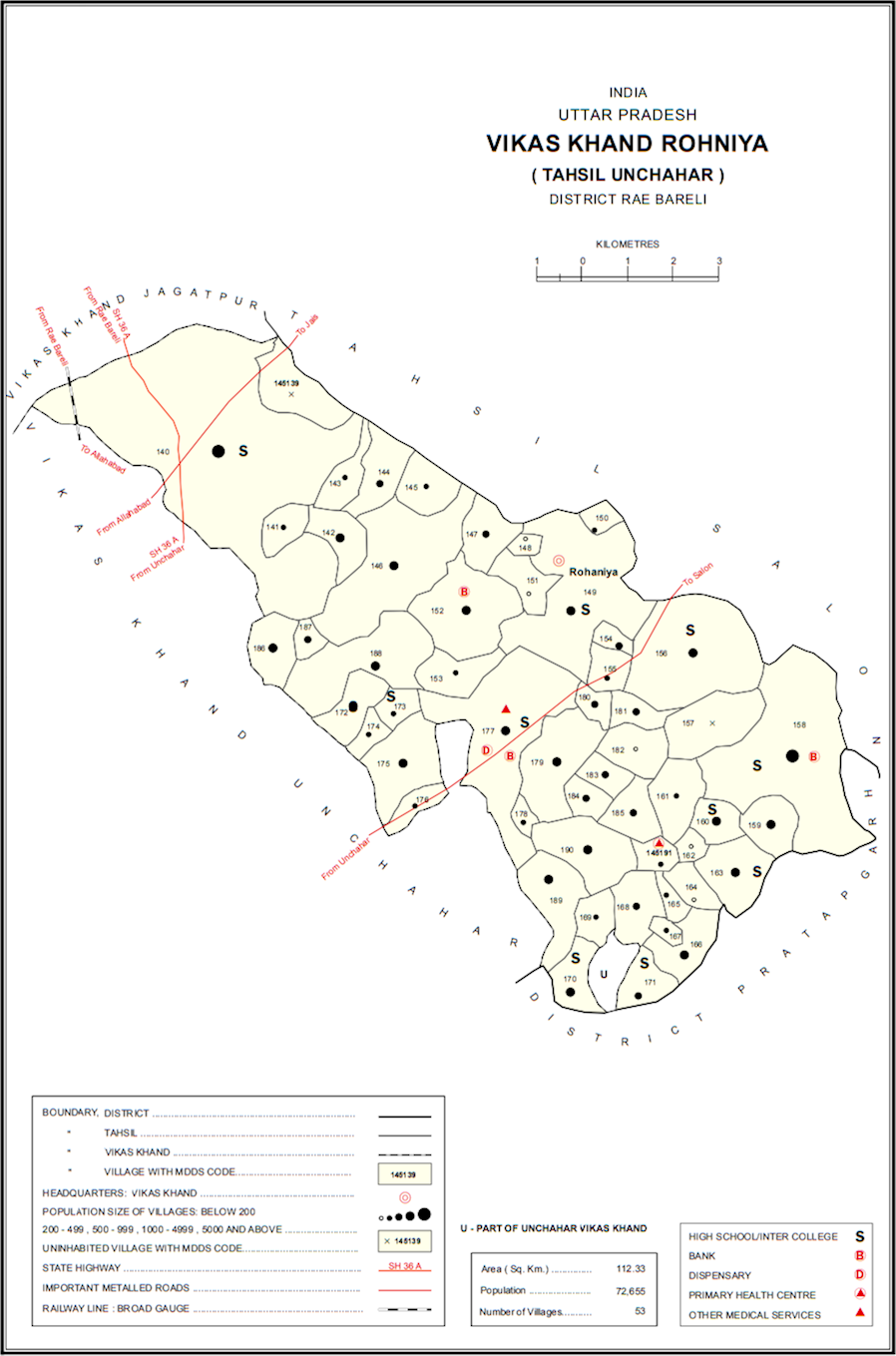
- Map showing Dhaurahra (#154) in Rohaniya CD block

- Location in Uttar Pradesh, India
- Coordinates: 25.963269°N 81.386798°E
- Country: India
- State: Uttar Pradesh
- District: Raebareli

Area
  - Total: 0.436 km^{2} (0.168 sq mi)

Population (2011)
  - Total: 680
  - Density: 1,600/km^{2} (4,000/sq mi)

Languages
  - Official: Hindi
- Time zone: UTC+5:30 (IST)
- Vehicle registration: UP-35

Dhaurahra is a village in Rohaniya block of Rae Bareli district, Uttar Pradesh, India. It is located 42 km from Raebareli, the district headquarters. As of 2011, it has a population of 680 people, in 139 households. It has one primary school and no healthcare facilities, and it does not host a permanent market or a weekly haat.

The 1961 census recorded Dhaurahra as comprising 1 hamlet, with a total population of 359 people (177 male and 182 female), in 88 households and 83 physical houses. The area of the village was given as 108 acres.

The 1981 census recorded Dhaurahra as having a population of 474 people, in 117 households, and having an area of 43.71 hectares. The main staple foods were listed as wheat and rice.
