= Itaura Buzurg =

- Village
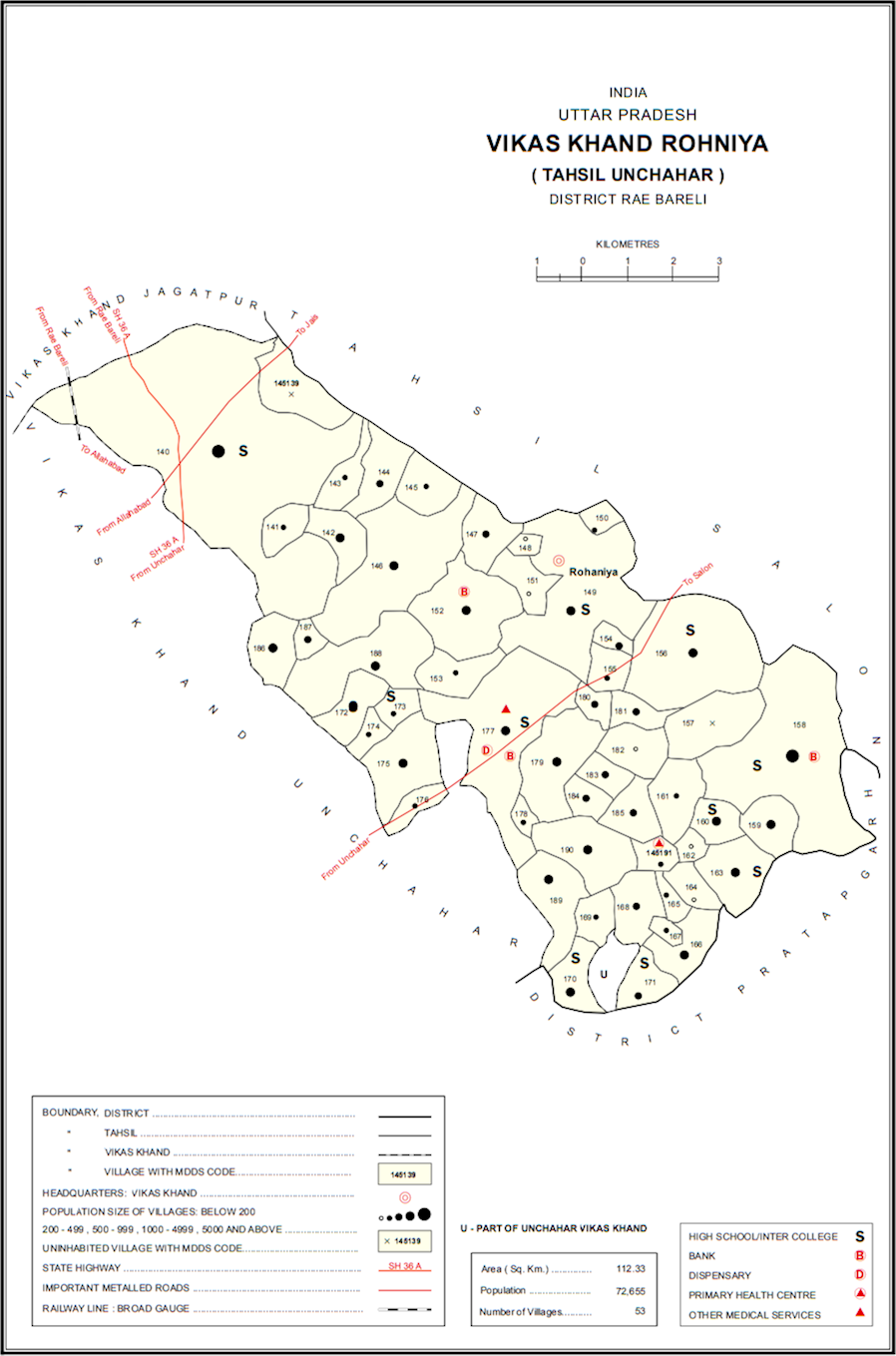
- Map showing Itaura Buzurg (#140) in Rohaniya CD block

- Location in Uttar Pradesh, India
- Coordinates: 26.002953°N 81.301328°E
- Country India: India
- State: Uttar Pradesh
- District: Raebareli

Area
  - Total: 20.14 km^{2} (7.78 sq mi)

Population (2011)
  - Total: 13,851
  - Density: 687.7/km^{2} (1,781/sq mi)

Languages
  - Official: Hindi
- Time zone: UTC+5:30 (IST)
- Vehicle registration: UP-35

Itaura Buzurg is a village in Rohaniya block of Rae Bareli district, Uttar Pradesh, India. One of the largest villages in the historical pargana of Salon, it is located 28 km from Raebareli, the district headquarters, near the point where the road to Allahabad intersects the one leading from Fursatganj to the Gukana ghat. As of 2011, Itaura Buzurg has a population of 13,851 people, in 2,469 households. It has 6 primary schools and no healthcare facilities.

== History ==
At the turn of the 20th century, Itaura Buzurg was described as a very large village consisting of many dispersed hamlets. It was divided into 19 mahals, which were held in single and joint zamindari tenure by some of the Kanhpurias of Nain. A large battle had taken place at Itaura Buzurg in 1245 AH between the Raja of Tiloi and Rai Jagannath Bahadur, which was won by the latter and resulted in his retention of the village. The population as of 1901 was 3,896 people. There was an aided school with 137 students around that time, and there was also the adjoining marketplace called Babuganj, which held markets twice a week.

The 1961 census recorded Itaura Buzurg as comprising 30 hamlets, with a total population of 5,503 people (2,810 male and 2,693 female), in 1,194 households and 1,182 physical houses. The area of the village was given as 5,158 acres.

The 1981 census recorded Itaura Buzurg as having a population of 7,619 people, in 1,756 households. The main staple foods were listed as wheat and rice.
