= Aihari Buzurg =

Aihari Buzurg Aihāri Buzurg
- Village
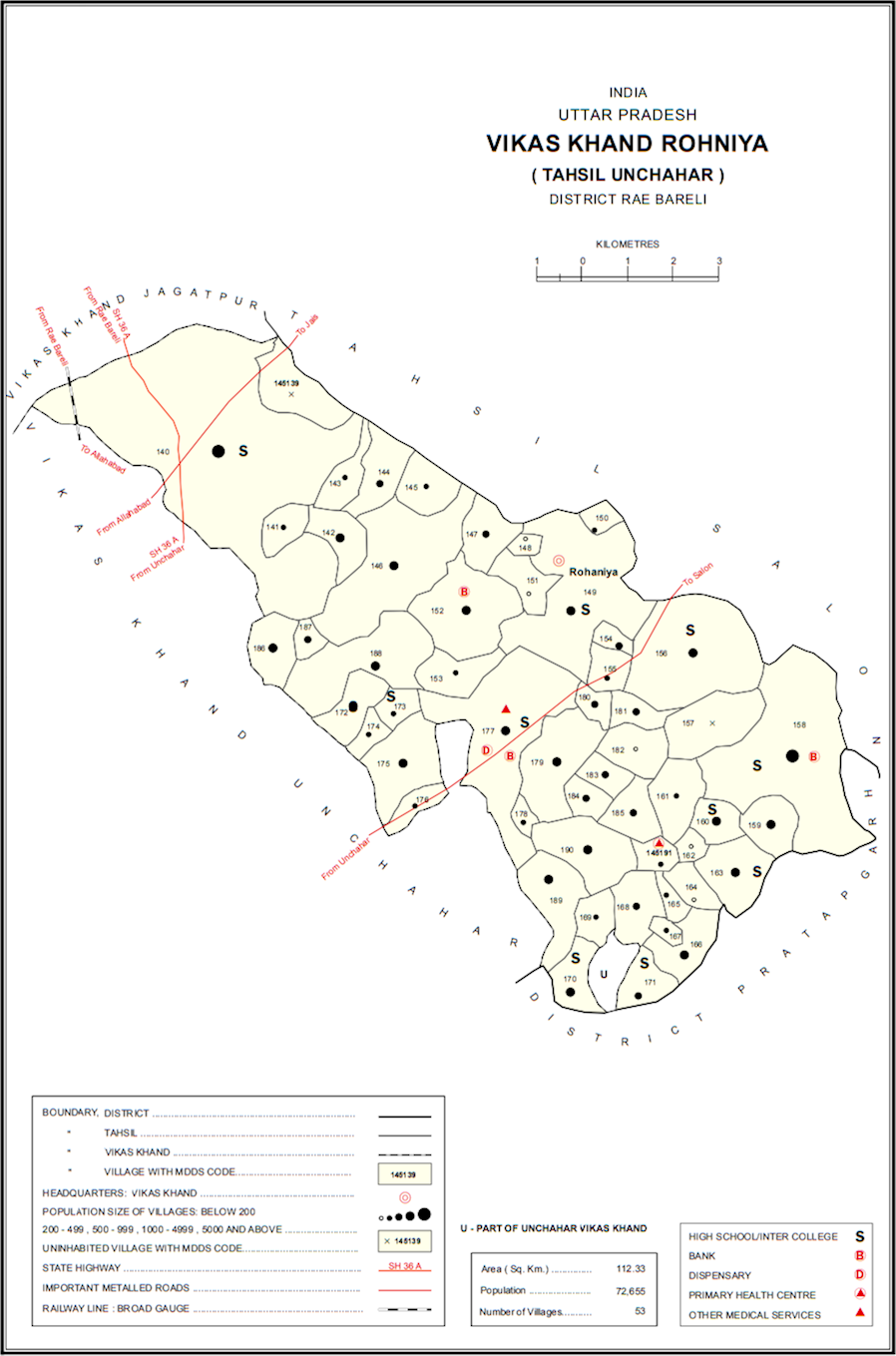
- Map showing Aihari Buzurg (#142) in Rohaniya CD block

- Location in Uttar Pradesh, India
- Coordinates: 25.983504°N 81.339774°E
- Country: India
- State: Uttar Pradesh
- District: Raebareli

Area
  - Total: 1.527 km^{2} (0.590 sq mi)

Population (2011)
  - Total: 1,101
  - Density: 721.0/km^{2} (1,867/sq mi)

Languages
  - Official: Hindi
- Time zone: UTC+5:30 (IST)
- Vehicle registration: UP-35

Aihari Buzurg is a village in Rohaniya block of Rae Bareli district, Uttar Pradesh, India. It is located 32 km from Raebareli, the district headquarters. As of 2011, it has a population of 1,101 people, in 192 households. It has one primary school and no healthcare facilities, and does not host a permanent market or a weekly haat.

The 1961 census recorded Aihari Buzurg as comprising 4 hamlets, with a total population of 560 people (281 male and 279 female), in 124 households and 124 physical houses. The area of the village was given as 376 acres.

The 1981 census recorded Aihari Buzurg as having a population of 581 people, in 147 households, and having an area of 152.57 hectares. The main staple foods were listed as wheat and rice.
