= Bachhaiyapur =

Bachhaiyapur Bachhaiyāpur
- Village
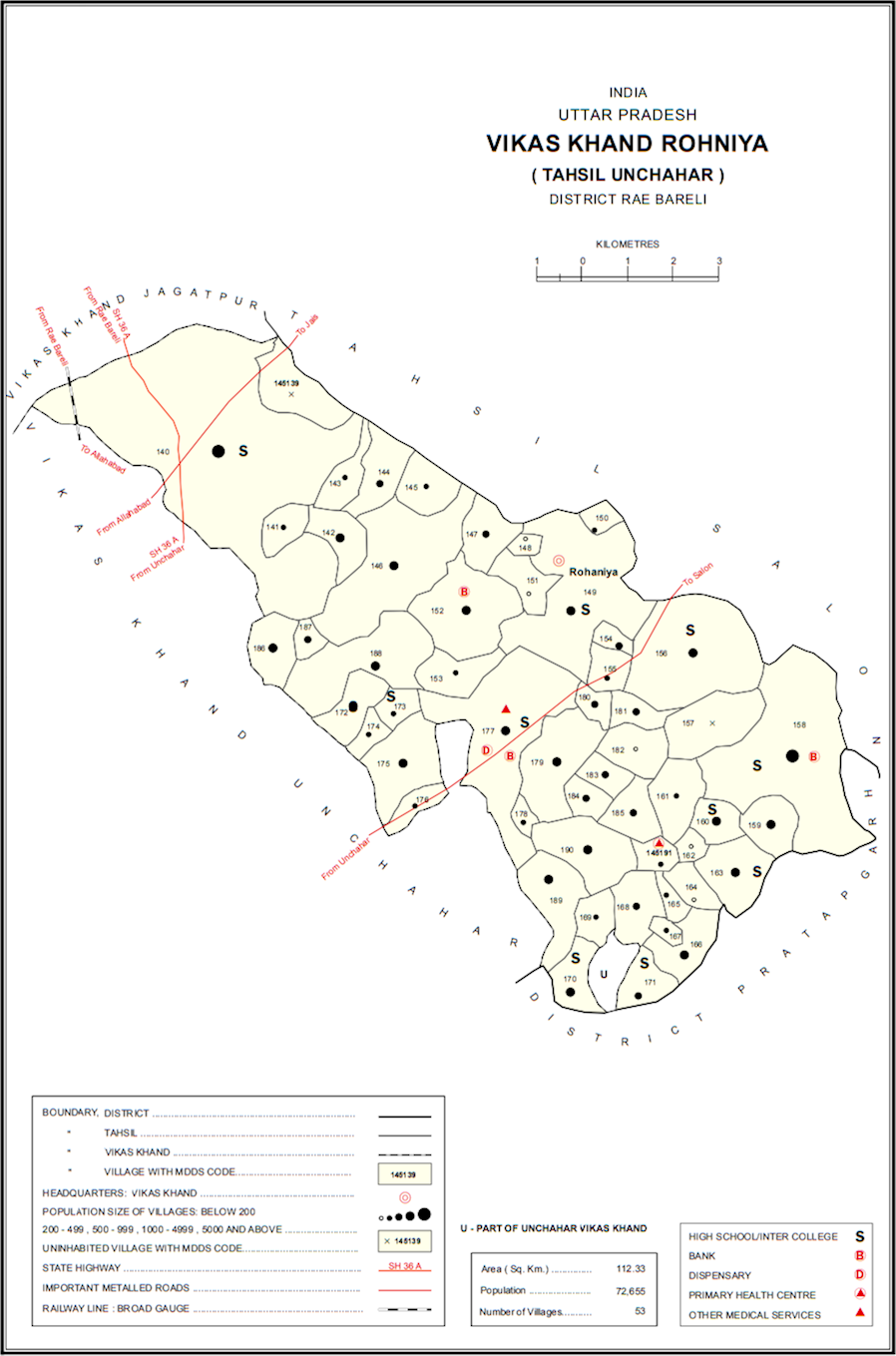
- Map showing Bachhaiyapur (#181) in Rohaniya CD block

- Location in Uttar Pradesh, India
- Coordinates: 25.948211°N 81.391131°E
- Country: India
- State: Uttar Pradesh
- District: Raebareli

Area
  - Total: 1.73 km^{2} (0.67 sq mi)

Population (2011)
  - Total: 505
  - Density: 292/km^{2} (756/sq mi)

Languages
  - Official: Hindi
- Time zone: UTC+5:30 (IST)
- Vehicle registration: UP-35

Bachhaiyapur is a village in Rohaniya block of Rae Bareli district, Uttar Pradesh, India. It is located 48 km from Raebareli, the district headquarters. As of 2011, it has a population of 505 people, in 100 households. It has two primary schools and no healthcare facilities, and it does not host a permanent market or a weekly haat.

== Census ==
The 1961 census recorded Bachhaiyapur (as "Bachaiyapur") as comprising 1 hamlet, with a total population of 130 people (65 male and 65 female), in 29 households and 29 physical houses. The area of the village was given as 428 acres.

The 1981 census recorded Bachhaiyapur as having a population of 208 people, in 46 households, and having an area of 173.20 hectares. The main staple foods were listed as wheat and rice.
