= Usraina =

- Village
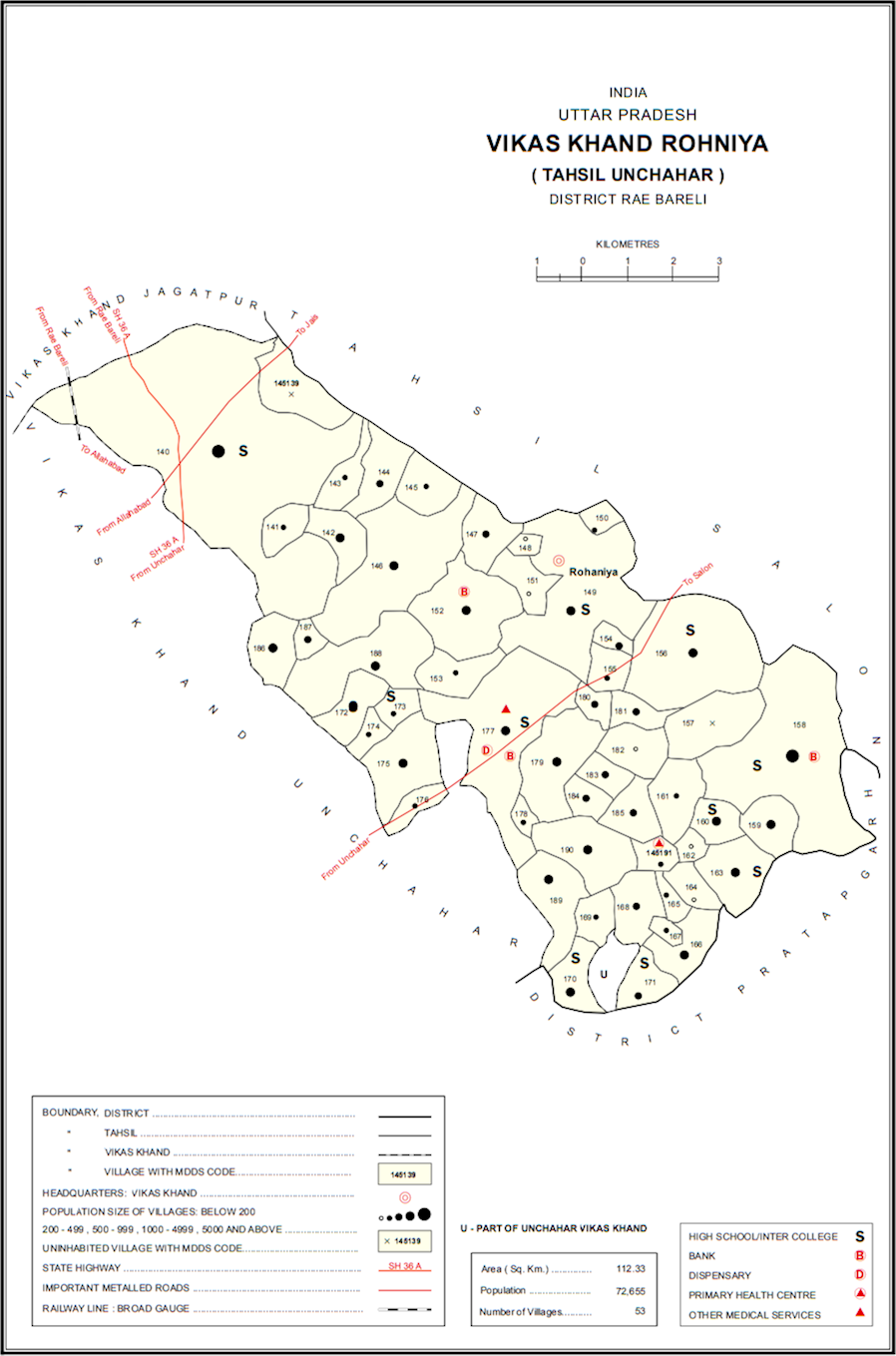
- Map showing Usraina (#156) in Rohaniya CD block

- Location in Uttar Pradesh, India
- Coordinates: 25.960394°N 81.409921°E
- Country: India
- State: Uttar Pradesh
- District: Raebareli

Area
  - Total: 5.329 km^{2} (2.058 sq mi)

Population (2011)
  - Total: 3,880
  - Density: 728/km^{2} (1,890/sq mi)

Languages
  - Official: Hindi
- Time zone: UTC+5:30 (IST)
- Vehicle registration: UP-35

Usraina is a village in Rohaniya block of Rae Bareli district, Uttar Pradesh, India. It is located 38 km from Raebareli, the district headquarters. As of 2011, it had a population of 3,880 people. It has one primary school and no healthcare facilities, and it hosts both a permanent market and a weekly haat.

The 1961 census recorded Usraina as comprising 11 hamlets, with a total population of 1,323 people (643 male and 680 female), in 407 households and 396 physical houses. The area of the village was given as 1,310 acres.

The 1981 census recorded Usraina as having a population of 1,818 people, in 403 households, and having an area of 533.79 hectares. The main staple foods were listed as wheat and rice.
