= Itaili =

- Village
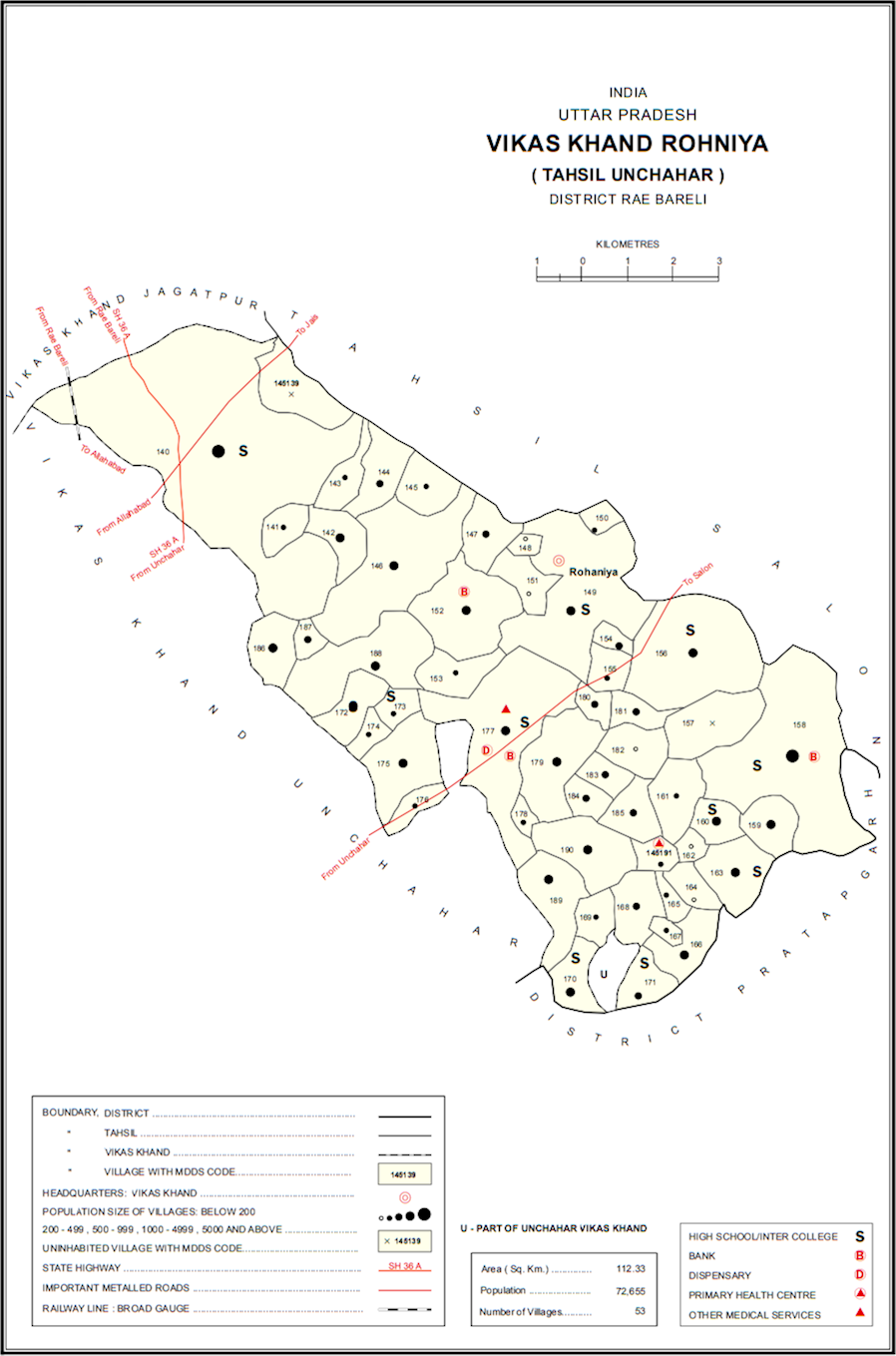
- Map showing Itaili (#166) in Rohaniya CD block

- Location in Uttar Pradesh, India
- Coordinates: 25.900871°N 81.406507°E
- Country: India
- State: Uttar Pradesh
- District: Raebareli

Area
  - Total: 1.252 km^{2} (0.483 sq mi)

Population (2011)
  - Total: 1,171
  - Density: 935.3/km^{2} (2,422/sq mi)

Languages
  - Official: Hindi
- Time zone: UTC+5:30 (IST)
- Vehicle registration: UP-35

Itaili is a village in Rohaniya block of Rae Bareli district, Uttar Pradesh, India. It is located 41 km from Raebareli, the district headquarters. As of 2011, it has a population of 1,171 people, in 205 households. It has one primary school and no healthcare facilities, and it does not host a permanent market or a weekly haat.

The 1961 census recorded Itaili as comprising 3 hamlets, with a total population of 377 people (192 male and 185 female), in 84 households and 83 physical houses. The area of the village was given as 337 acres.

The 1981 census recorded Itaili as having a population of 646 people, in 107 households, and having an area of 122.22 hectares. The main staple foods were listed as wheat and rice.
