= Marhamau =

Marhamau Marhāmau
- Village
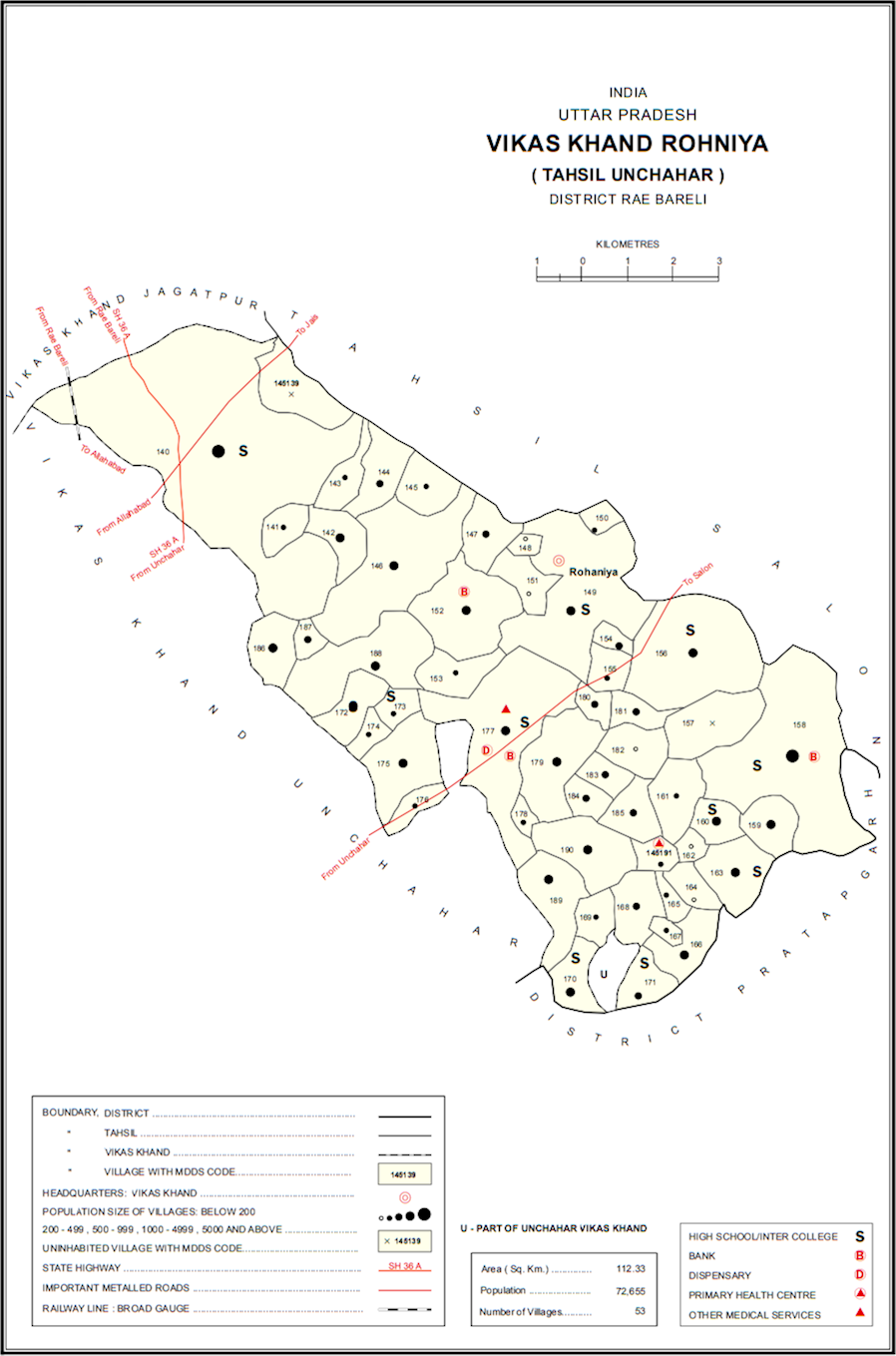
- Map showing Marhamau (#157) in Rohaniya CD block

- Location in Uttar Pradesh, India
- Coordinates: 25.948181°N 81.41169°E
- Country: India
- State: Uttar Pradesh
- District: Raebareli

Area
  - Total: 2.133 km^{2} (0.824 sq mi)

Population (2011)
  - Total: 0
  - Density: 0.0/km^{2} (0.0/sq mi)

Languages
  - Official: Hindi
- Time zone: UTC+5:30 (IST)
- Vehicle registration: UP-35

Marhamau is an abandoned village in Rohaniya block of Rae Bareli district, Uttar Pradesh, India. It is located 44 km from Raebareli, the district headquarters. As of 2011, Marhamau is uninhabited, although the land is used for agricultural purposes. The village lands cover 213.3 hectares, all of which was used as farmland in 2011.

The 1961 census recorded Marhamau as comprising 1 hamlet, with a total population of 59 people (26 male and 33 female), in 21 households and 20 physical houses. The area of the village was given as 527 acres.

The 1981 census recorded Marhamau as having a population of 0 and an area of 213.26 hectares.
