= Raipur, Rohaniya =

Raipur Rāipur
- Village
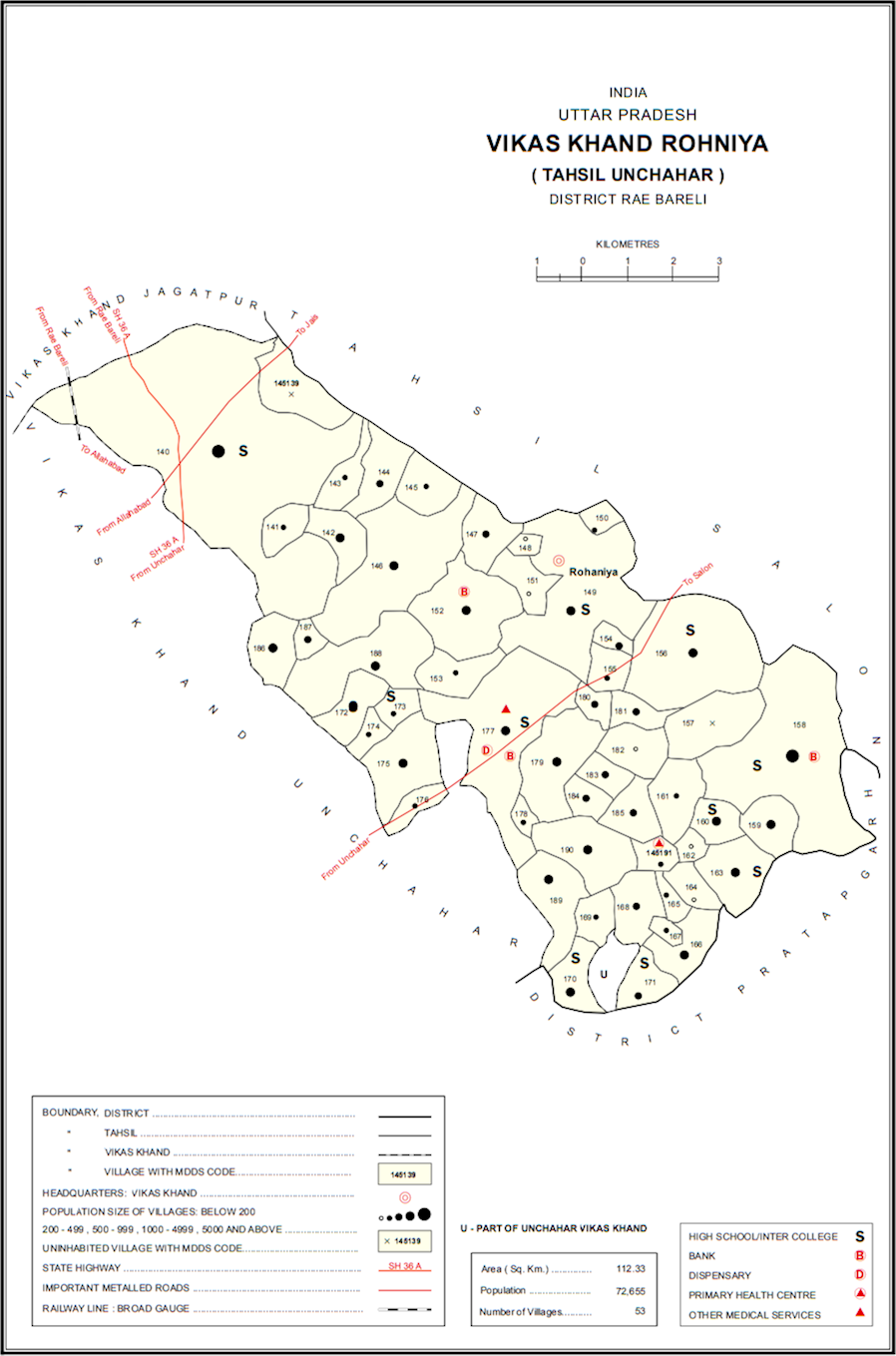
- Map showing Raipur (#152) in Rohaniya CD block

- Location in Uttar Pradesh, India
- Coordinates: 25.965691°N 81.353674°E
- Country: India
- State: Uttar Pradesh
- District: Raebareli

Area
  - Total: 3.12 km^{2} (1.20 sq mi)

Population (2011)
  - Total: 1,256
  - Density: 403/km^{2} (1,040/sq mi)

Languages
  - Official: Hindi
- Time zone: UTC+5:30 (IST)
- Vehicle registration: UP-35

Raipur is a village in Rohaniya block of Rae Bareli district, Uttar Pradesh, India. It is located 38 km from Raebareli, the district headquarters. As of 2011, it has a population of 1,256 people, in 242 households. It has one primary school and no healthcare facilities, and it does not host a permanent market or a weekly haat.

The 1961 census recorded Raipur as comprising 8 hamlets, with a total population of 572 people (284 male and 288 female), in 137 households and 136 physical houses. The area of the village was given as 771 acres.

The 1981 census recorded Raipur as having a population of 837 people, in 182 households, and having an area of 312.03 hectares. The main staple foods were listed as wheat and rice.
