= Umran, Raebareli =

Umran Umaran
- Village
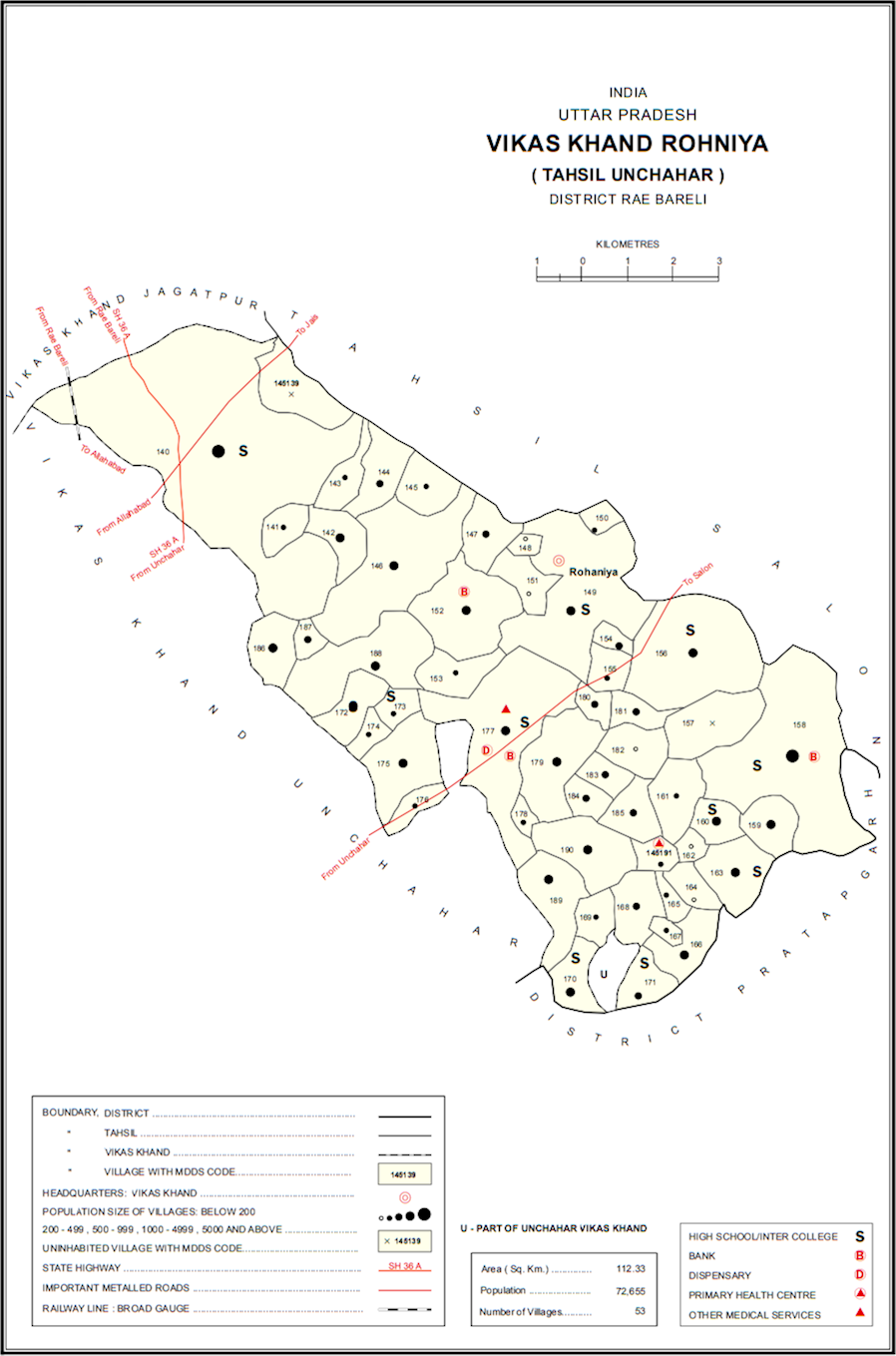
- Map showing Umran (#177) in Rohaniya CD block

- Location in Uttar Pradesh, India
- Coordinates: 25.94384°N 81.364448°E
- Country: India
- State: Uttar Pradesh
- District: Raebareli

Area
  - Total: 6.641 km^{2} (2.564 sq mi)

Population (2011)
  - Total: 4,786
  - Density: 720.7/km^{2} (1,867/sq mi)

Languages
  - Official: Hindi
- Time zone: UTC+5:30 (IST)
- Vehicle registration: UP-35

Umran, also spelled Umaran, is a village in Rohaniya block of Rae Bareli district, Uttar Pradesh, India. It is located 44 km from Raebareli, the district headquarters. As of 2011, it has a population of 4,786 people, in 918 households. It has one primary school and one primary health sub centre. It hosts a haat on Mondays and Fridays.

The 1961 census recorded Umran as comprising 10 hamlets, with a total population of 1,665 people (838 male and 827 female), in 396 households and 394 physical houses. The area of the village was given as 1,609 acres and it had electricity at that point.

The 1981 census recorded Umran (as "Umaran") as having a population of 2,513 people, in 661 households, and having an area of 651.14 hectares. The main staple foods were listed as wheat and rice.
